= Saint Andrew South Western =

Jamaican parliamentary constituency

Saint Andrew South Western is a parliamentary constituency represented in the House of Representatives of the Jamaican Parliament. It elects one Member of Parliament MP by the first past the post system of election. The constituency was created in 1959. It is currently represented by the Dr Angela Brown-Burke of the PNP.

Since the mid 1970s Saint Andrew South Western has been an extremely safe seat for the People's National Party, which has won it by overwhelming margins in every election since except for the PNP-boycotted 1983 election.

== Boundaries ==
The constituency includes Payne Land and Whitfield in Saint Andrew Parish.

== Members of Parliament ==
Election	Member	Party
1959	Clem Tavares	Jamaica Labour Party
1972	Wilton Hill	Jamaica Labour Party
1976	Portia Simpson	People's National Party
1983	Christopher Rose	Jamaica Labour Party
1989	Portia Simpson-Miller	People's National Party
2017	Angela Brown-Burke	People's National Party

== Elections ==
General Election 2011: Saint Andrew South Western
Party	Candidate	Votes	%	±%
PNP	Portia Simpson-Miller	10,973	94.94	+0.97
JLP	Victor Hyde	553	4.78	−0.97
Majority		10,420	90.16	+2.22
Turnout		11,526	52.00	−5.09
PNP hold				

General Election 2007: Saint Andrew South Western
Party	Candidate	Votes	%	±%
PNP	Portia Simpson-Miller	9,360	93.97	−0.16
JLP	Garnett Reid	601	6.03	+0.16
Majority		8,759	87.94	−0.32
Turnout		9,961	57.09	+0.93
PNP hold				

General Election 2002: Saint Andrew South Western
Party	Candidate	Votes	%	±%
PNP	Portia Simpson-Miller	9,716	94.02	−3.97
JLP	Garnett Reid	618	5.98	+3.97
Majority		9,098	88.04	−7.94
Turnout		10,334	51.41	−29.98
PNP hold				

General Election 1997: Saint Andrew South Western
Party	Candidate	Votes	%	±%
PNP	Portia Simpson-Miller	15,191	97.99	−1.58
JLP	Basil Smith	312	2.01	+1.58
Majority		14,879	95.98	−3.16
Turnout		15,503	81.30	−9.90
PNP hold				

General Election 1993: Saint Andrew South Western
Party	Candidate	Votes	%	±%
PNP	Portia Simpson-Miller	16,439	99.57	+1.66
JLP	Basil Smith	71	0.43	−1.66
Majority		16,368	99.14	+3.32
Turnout		16,510	91.20	−3.40
PNP hold				

General Election 1989: Saint Andrew South Western
Party	Candidate	Votes	%	±%
PNP	Portia Simpson-Miller	18,577	97.91	NEW
JLP	Royland Williams	396	2.09	−97.91
Majority		18,181	95.82	
Turnout		18,973	94.60	
PNP gain from JLP				

General Election 1983: Saint Andrew South Western
Party	Candidate	Votes	%	±%
JLP	Christopher Rose (unopposed)			
JLP gain from PNP				

General Election 1980: Saint Andrew South Western
Party	Candidate	Votes	%	±%
PNP	Portia Simpson	17,192	79.17	+3.54
JLP	Tom Tavares-Finson	4,524	20.83	−3.54
Majority		12,668	58.34	+7.08
Turnout		21,716	105.06	+10.46
PNP hold				

General Election 1976: Saint Andrew South Western
Party	Candidate	Votes	%	±%
PNP	Portia Simpson	13,584	75.63	+39.99
JLP	Royland Williams	4,376	24.37	−39.99
Majority		9,208	51.26	+22.54
Turnout		17,960	94.60	+20.63
PNP gain from JLP				

General Election 1972: Saint Andrew South Western
Party	Candidate	Votes	%	±%
JLP	Wilton Hill	7,261	64.36	
PNP	Jason Gordon	4,020	35.64	
Majority		3,241	28.72	
Turnout		11,281	73.97	
JLP hold				
