= List of heads of state of Jamaica =

This is a list of the heads of state of Jamaica, from the independence of Jamaica in 1962 to the present day.

From 1962 the head of state under the Jamaica Independence Act 1962 is the Monarch of Jamaica, currently Charles III, who is also the King of the United Kingdom and the other Commonwealth realms. The King is represented in Jamaica by a Governor-General.

== Monarch (1962–present) ==
The succession to the throne is the same as the succession to the British throne.

No.	Portrait	Monarch (Birth–Death)	Reign			Royal House	Prime Minister
No.	Portrait	Monarch (Birth–Death)	Reign start	Reign end	Duration	Royal House	Prime Minister
1		Queen Elizabeth II (1926–2022)	6 August 1962	8 September 2022	60 years, 33 days	Windsor	Bustamante; Sangster; Shearer; Manley; Seaga; Manley; Patterson; Simpson-Miller; Golding; Holness; Simpson-Miller; Holness
2		King Charles III (born 1948)	8 September 2022	Incumbent	3 years, 51 days	Windsor	Holness

=== Governor-General ===
The Governor-General is the representative of the monarch in Jamaica and exercises most of their powers. The Governor-General is appointed for an indefinite term, serving at the pleasure of the monarch. After the passage of the Statute of Westminster 1931, the Governor-General is appointed solely on the advice of the Cabinet of Jamaica without the involvement of the British government. In the event of a vacancy the Chief Justice served as Officer Administering the Government.

Status

Denotes Chief Justice acting as Officer Administering the Government

No.	Portrait	Governor-General (Birth–Death)	Term of office			Monarch	Prime Minister
No.	Portrait	Governor-General (Birth–Death)	Took office	Left office	Time in office	Monarch	Prime Minister
1		Sir Kenneth Blackburne (1907–1980)	6 August 1962	30 November 1962	116 days	Elizabeth II	Bustamante
2		Sir Clifford Campbell (1892–1991)	1 December 1962	28 February 1973	10 years, 89 days	Elizabeth II	Bustamante; Sangster; Shearer; Manley
–		Sir Herbert Duffus (1908–2002)	28 February 1973	27 June 1973	119 days	Elizabeth II	Manley
3		Sir Florizel Glasspole (1909–2000)	27 June 1973	31 March 1991	17 years, 277 days	Elizabeth II	Manley; Seaga; Manley
–		Sir Edward Zacca (1931–2019)	31 March 1991	1 August 1991	123 days	Elizabeth II	Manley
4		Sir Howard Cooke (1915–2014)	1 August 1991	15 February 2006	14 years, 198 days	Elizabeth II	Manley; Patterson
5		Sir Kenneth O. Hall (born 1941)	15 February 2006	26 February 2009	3 years, 11 days	Elizabeth II	Patterson; Simpson-Miller; Golding
6		Sir Patrick Allen (born 1951)	26 February 2009	Incumbent	16 years, 245 days	Elizabeth II; Charles III	Golding; Holness; Simpson-Miller; Holness

== Standards ==
Royal Standard of Elizabeth II

Governor-General's Standard
