= Republicanism in Jamaica =

Movement to turn Jamaica into a republic

Republicanism in Jamaica is a position which advocates that Jamaica's system of government be changed from a constitutional monarchy, the monarchy of Jamaica, to a republic. Both major political parties – the Jamaica Labour Party and the People's National Party – subscribe to the position, and the current Prime Minister of Jamaica, Andrew Holness, has announced that transitioning to a republic will be a priority of his government. In June 2022, the Jamaican government announced its intention for Jamaica to become a republic by the time of the next general election in September 2025, though in March 2025 this was retracted. The process would include a two-thirds majority vote in parliament and a referendum.

== Background ==
In the lead-up to Jamaican independence in 1962, the Parliament of Jamaica established a cross-party joint select committee to prepare a new constitution. The committee received several submissions calling for Jamaica to become a republic, which it "heard politely, but rejected unceremoniously". The People's Freedom Movement, an extra-parliamentary opposition party, suggested that the constitution include a provision for a referendum on a republic at a later date, but this was not carried out. Both major party leaders in Jamaica in the lead-up to independence (the JLP's Alexander Bustamante and the PNP's Norman Manley) were opposed to Jamaica becoming a republic. Law professor Stephen Vasciannie has suggested that the decision to retain the monarchy at independence was due to several factors, including a desire for continuity and stability, a desire to demonstrate the maturity required for independence, the popularity of the Royal Family amongst Jamaicans, and tendencies towards Anglophilia among the political elites.

== History ==
The first Jamaican prime minister to make steps towards a republic was Michael Manley, whose People's National Party (PNP) came to power at the 1972 general election. His government established a commission into constitutional reform in 1975, and in July 1977, following a march to commemorate the Morant Bay rebellion, Manley announced that Jamaica would become a republic by 1981. However, his government was defeated at the 1980 general election by the more conservative Jamaica Labour Party (JLP), led by Edward Seaga. Seaga was also in favour of a republic, having expressed a preference for a "ceremonial presidency" in 1977. Despite this, no concrete moves towards a republic occurred during his premiership.

In 2002, the Parliament of Jamaica, with the PNP, led by P. J. Patterson, holding the plurality of seats, abolished the requirement for public servants to take an oath of allegiance to the Jamaican monarch. At a PNP conference in September 2003, Patterson expressed his hopes that Jamaica would become a republic by 2007, stating that "the time has come when we must have a head of state chosen by us". However, his government's attempts to transition to a republic were stifled by its simultaneous attempts to abolish the Judicial Committee of the Privy Council as the final court of appeal in Jamaica and replace it with Caribbean Court of Justice. The opposition JLP was against that decision (which would also have required a constitutional amendment) and made their support for republicanism conditional on a referendum being held for the judicial changes, which was not forthcoming.

The PNP was defeated in the 2007 general election. The new prime minister, JLP leader Bruce Golding, promised that his government would "amend the constitution to replace the Queen with a Jamaican president who symbolises the unity of the nation", but the JLP's term in Cabinet came to an end at the 2011 general election without any formal steps towards a republic having been taken. Portia Simpson-Miller, the PNP leader and new prime minister, also publicly affirmed her commitment to republicanism, stating a preference for an elected president. However, the PNP lost power at the 2016 general election without bringing about constitutional change. Andrew Holness, Simpson-Miller's successor as prime minister, also affirmed a commitment to republicanism upon taking office and stated his Cabinet would introduce a bill to replace the Queen with "a non-executive president as head of state".

During the 2020 Jamaican general election, the PNP promised to hold a referendum on becoming a republic within 18 months if it won the election. However, the ruling JLP, which had in 2016 promised a referendum but not carried one out, was re-elected and stated that holding a referendum remains a goal.

In April 2022, former Prime Minister PJ Patterson resigned from the Privy Council of the United Kingdom in support of a push for a republic. The Minister of Legal and Constitutional Affairs, Marlene Malahoo Forte, announced that the transition is to be completed by the time of next general election, currently scheduled to be in 2025. Popular support for republicanism accelerated following the death of Elizabeth II. In the lead-up to King Charles III's coronation on 6 May 2023, Forte stated that a referendum could even be held in 2024 and emphasised that the coronation itself accelerated this process. In February 2024, the government announced in the Throne Speech that the legislative priorities for the next parliamentary year will focus on "amendments towards establishing the Republic of Jamaica". However, the following month Forte stated that legislation around a transition to a republic was unlikely to be passed in 2024.

In addition, the JLP and PNP have taken stances regarding the role of the judicial branch in the process of establishing a republic, with the PNP preferring to replace the Privy Council with the Caribbean Court of Justice during the process and the JLP, which its opposed to joining the CCJ, preferring to establish a local apex court in Kingston during the second phase of the process.

== Legal process ==
All amendments to the Constitution of Jamaica must be approved by an absolute majority in both the House of Representatives and the Senate. However, certain sections of the constitution, including those on the monarchy, can only be amended if they are approved by a two-thirds majority in both houses and submitted to a referendum.

=== Relevant legislation ===
In May 2024, the Jamaican parliament passed the Constitution (Amendment of Section 61) Act, 2024, which removed the reference to the sovereign from the words of enactment.

In September 2024, the Jamaican government announced that it had received two draft bills from the chief parliamentary counsel. The Constitution (Amendment) (Republic of Jamaica) Bill, 2024 provides for the Jamaican constitution to be amended to replace the Jamaican monarch with a non-executive president, and also for the constitution to undergo a process of "Jamaicanisation", where it is deemed to have been enacted by the Jamaican parliament and people rather than as a statute of the United Kingdom. The Referendum Bill, 2024 provides for the proposed amendments to be taken to a public vote, as required by section 49 of the constitution.

In December 2024, a bill was tabled on transitioning to becoming a republic, after which it requires review by joint committees, followed by a parliamentary vote and finally a referendum.

It was announced in March 2025 that a referendum would not occur before the 2025 Jamaican general election.

== Opinion polling ==
A 2012 poll showed that 45% supported the move to a republic with 40% in opposition.

A 2020 poll showed 55% of respondents in Jamaica wanted the country to become a republic.

A Don Anderson poll conducted in 2022 showed 59% support for becoming a republic, with 27% in opposition.

An Ashcroft poll conducted in February and March 2023 showed that 49% of respondents supported the country becoming a republic, with 40% opposing and 11% not knowing or would not vote.

August and September 2023 found support for becoming a republic at 45%, with 26% opposing.

A survey in September 2024 by Bluedot polling for the Nationwide News Network showed support for a republic at 38%, with 24% opposed. A plurality of respondents, 39%, responded that they were unsure about such a move.

A March 2026 poll hosted by Pollfish found 39% support for not having a resident Jamaican monarch, 33% support for having a resident Jamaican monarch and 28% undecided.

== See also ==
- Republicanism in Antigua and Barbuda
- Republicanism in Australia
- Republicanism in the Bahamas
- Republicanism in Canada
- Republicanism in New Zealand
- Republicanism in the United Kingdom
- Scottish republicanism
- Welsh republicanism
