= Deputy Prime Minister of Jamaica =

- Coat of arms of Jamaica
- Incumbent; Horace Chang since September 2020
- Appointer: Governor-General of Jamaica

Deputy Prime Minister of Jamaica is a senior cabinet-level position in Jamaica.

The deputy prime minister is appointed by the Governor-General of Jamaica on the recommendation of the Prime Minister of Jamaica.

== Deputy Prime Ministers ==
Name	Prime Minister	Took office	Left office	Party	Notes
Donald Sangster	Alexander Bustamante	11 March 1963	February 1967	JLP	
Clem Tavares	Donald Sangster	February 1967	April 1967	JLP	
Vacant	Hugh Shearer	April 1967	March 1972	JLP	
David Coore	Michael Manley	March 1972	1978	PNP	
P. J. Patterson	Michael Manley	1978	November 1980	PNP	
Hugh Shearer	Edward Seaga	November 1980	February 1989	JLP	
P. J. Patterson	Michael Manley	February 1989	March 1992	PNP	
Vacant	P. J. Patterson	March 1992	April 1993	PNP	
Seymour Mullings	P. J. Patterson	April 1993	October 2001	PNP	
Vacant	P. J. Patterson	October 2001	March 2006	PNP	
Vacant	Portia Simpson-Miller	March 2006	September 2007	PNP	
Kenneth Baugh	Bruce Golding	September 2007	October 2011	JLP	
Kenneth Baugh	Andrew Holness	October 2011	January 2012	JLP	
Peter Phillips	Portia Simpson-Miller	January 2012	March 2016	PNP	
Vacant	Andrew Holness	March 2016	September 2020	JLP	
Horace Chang	Andrew Holness	September 2020	Incumbent	JLP	

== See also ==
- Prime Minister of Jamaica
