= David Coore =

Jamaican politician (1925–2011)

The Honourable David Coore OJ KC

Deputy Prime Minister of Jamaica
- In office March 1972 – 1978
- Prime Minister: Michael Manley
- Succeeded by: P. J. Patterson

Attorney General of Jamaica
- In office 1993–1995
- Prime Minister: P. J. Patterson
- Preceded by: Carl Rattray
- Succeeded by: A. J. Nicholson

Minister of Foreign Affairs and Foreign Trade
- In office 1989–1993
- Prime Minister: Michael Manley
- Preceded by: Hugh Shearer
- Succeeded by: Paul Robertson

Personal details
- Born: David Hilton Coore; 22 August 1925 Anchovy, St. James, Jamaica
- Died: 14 November 2011 (aged 86) Dominican Republic
- Party: People's National Party
- Spouse(s): Rita Angela Innis (m. 1949; died 1975) Maria De Marchena
- Children: 3
- Education: McGill University; Oxford University

David Hilton Coore OJ KC (22 August 1925 – 14 November 2011) was a Jamaican lawyer, politician and statesman who served as Deputy Prime Minister of Jamaica under Michael Manley.

Coore served in the House of Representatives from 1967 to 1978. He returned to Parliament in 1989 when he was appointed as a senator. He also held key cabinet positions, including Minister of Finance, Minister of Foreign Affairs and Foreign Trade, and Attorney General.

Among his children were Stephen ‘Cat’ Coore a popular reggae musician, who was with the bands Inner Circle and Third World.
