= Vernon Arnett =

Jamaican businessman and politician

Minister of Finance and the Public Service
- In office May 1959 – April 1962
- Monarch: Elizabeth II
- Governor-General: Sir Kenneth Blackburne
- Preceded by: Noel Newton Nethersole
- Succeeded by: Donald Sangster

Personal details
- Born: 1905
- Died: 1981 (aged 75–76)
- Party: People's National Party

Vernon Arnett was a businessman and politician from Jamaica. He was elected to the House of Representatives of Jamaica as a member of the People's National Party. He served as Minister of Finance and the Public Service from May 1959 to April 1962.

As he was a member of the People's National Party, and at a conference in 1964, Vivian Blake clashed with Vernon Arnett over proposals for land reform and the party's support for democratic socialism; Arnett's supporters blasted Blake as a "capitalist", "land baron", and "race-horse owner", while one of Blake's supporters drew a pistol. The conference quickly dispersed thereafter. Vivian Blake said to represent the party's "Glasspole tendencies", that is to say, its right wing.
