= Seymour Mullings =

Jamaican politician and musician (1931–2013)

The Honourable Seymour St. Edward Mullings OJ CD

Deputy Prime Minister of Jamaica
- In office April 1993 – October 2001
- Monarch: Elizabeth II
- Prime Minister: P. J. Patterson
- Preceded by: Vacant
- Succeeded by: Vacant

Member of Parliament for Saint Ann South East
- In office 1969–1983
- In office 1989–2002
- Succeeded by: Aloun Ndombet-Assamba

Minister of Finance and the Public Service
- In office 1989–1990
- Prime Minister: Edward Seaga
- Preceded by: Edward Seaga
- Succeeded by: P.J. Patterson

Personal details
- Born: 12 May 1931 Cave Valley, Saint Ann, Colony of Jamaica
- Died: 9 October 2013 (aged 82) Kingston, Jamaica
- Party: People's National Party

Seymour St. Edward "Foggy" Mullings OJ CD (12 May 1931 – 9 October 2013) was a Jamaican politician, who served as Deputy Prime Minister under P. J. Patterson. He was also an accomplished pianist.

== Career ==
Seymour Mullings attended Jamaica College in St Andrew. He worked as a jazz pianist from the 1940s to the 1960s, playing with the likes of Don Drummond and Cluett Johnson, and in the late 1940s was a member of the Wilton Gaynair All-Star band. He was also organist at the Anglican Church in Claremont, St. Ann Mullings served as president of the Jamaica Federations of Musicians, and was inducted into the Jazz Hall of Fame in 1997. His nephew is the deejay Tony Rebel.

He entered politics in 1969, winning a by-election for the St Ann South East seat in the House of Representatives. He retained his seat in the elections of 1972, 1976, and 1980, losing it due to the PNP's boycott of the 1983 election, and regaining it in 1989 and defending it successfully it in 1993 and 1997. He served in the cabinet under Michael Manley in the late 1980s, going on to hold the posts of Minister of Finance, Minister of Agriculture and Minister of Foreign Affairs & Foreign Trade, and was appointed as Deputy Prime Minister by P. J. Patterson, a post he held from April 1993 to October 2001. He retired from parliament in 2002, although he still attended parliamentary sittings for several years, and was appointed as ambassador to Washington, D.C., a post he held until 2004.

In 2012, a road in St Ann was named Seymour Mullings Boulevard in his honour.

Seymour Mullings died at Andrews Memorial Hospital in Kingston on 9 October 2013, aged 82, after a long illness. He had suffered from Alzheimer's disease for several years.
