= Lorna Golding =

Jamaican politician and first lady

Mrs. Lorna Golding
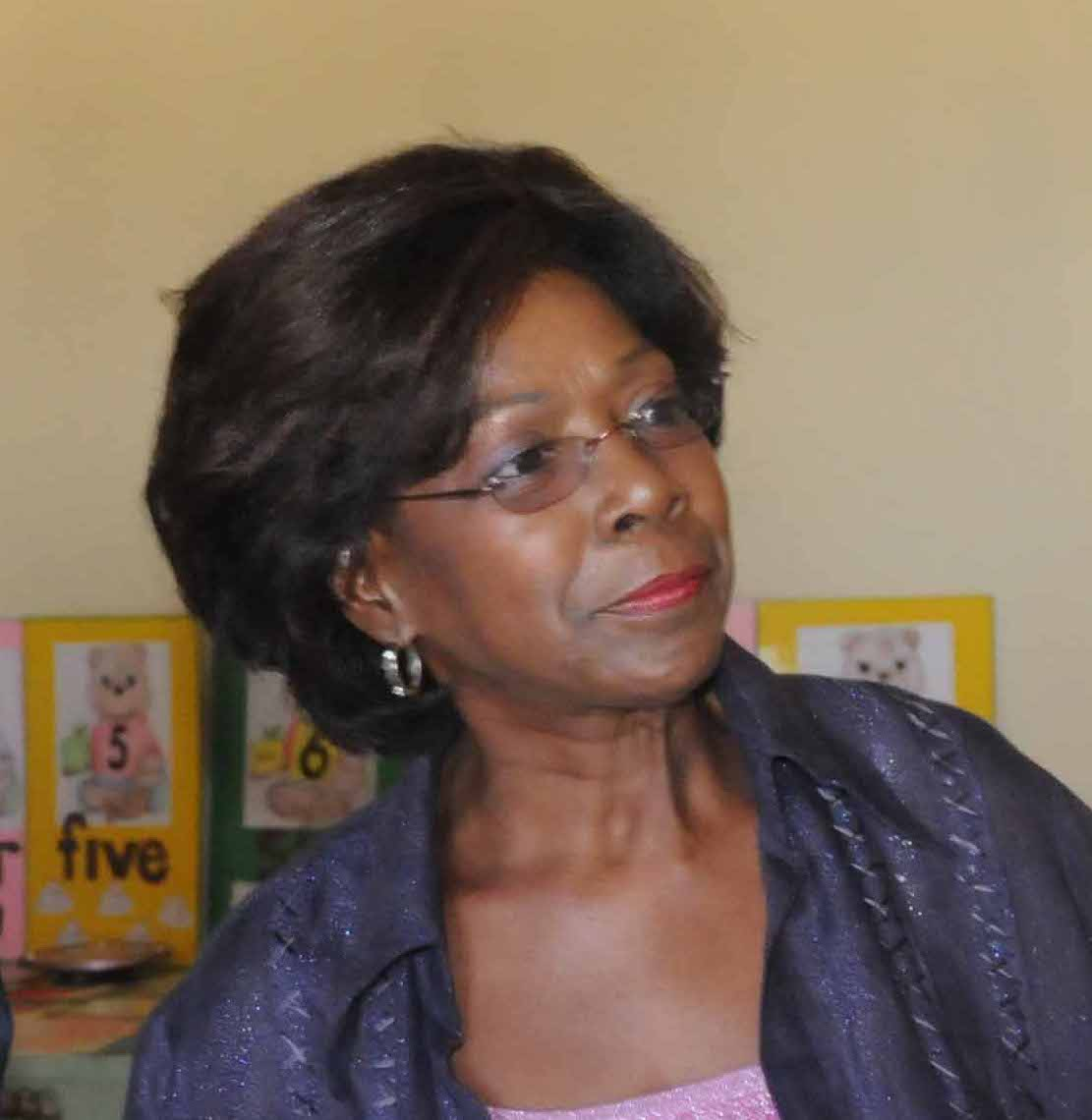
- Golding in 2009
- Born: Lorna Charles; July 6, 1951 (age 74); Jamaica
- Predecessor: Glynne Ewart
- Successor: Juliet Holness
- Spouse: Bruce Golding (m. 1972)
- Children: Sherene Golding Campbell Steven Golding, Ann-Merita Golding

Lorna Golding (née Charles) is the wife of the 8th Prime Minister of Jamaica, Bruce Golding. Lorna Golding, is sister of retired JLP MP, Minister, and Speaker of the House Pearnel Charles. She completed school at New York Business Institute and worked at the office of British and Africa Affairs and the United Kingdom and Supply delegation, a subsidiary of the British Consulate. She later worked for the NAACP (National Association for the Advancement of Coloured People) and with the Sierra Leone Mission to the United Nations. Her career has included working in Early Childhood Education - Building a Better Jamaica.
