= Wood Hall =

- Village
- Location within Jamaica
- Coordinates: 18.0559°N 77.2599°W
- Country: Jamaica
- Parish: Clarendon

For the former school in Mississippi see Wood Junior College#Campus

Wood Hall is a community in Clarendon, Jamaica.

Most children attend the Wood Hall Primary School.

There have been a few notable people who were from Wood Hall. Private Allan Finlay Magnan, a a Canadian World War I hero, was born in Wood Hall. Portia Simpson-Miller, Jamaica's first female Prime Minister, was also born in Wood Hall.
