= 1997 Jamaican general election =

1997 Jamaica general election
← 1993	18 December 1997	2002 →
- All 60 seats in the House of Representatives; 31 seats needed for a majority
- Turnout: 65.22% (▼2.13pp)
Party	Leader	Vote %	Seats	+/–
PNP	P. J. Patterson	56.20	50	−2
JLP	Edward Seaga	38.89	10	+2
This lists parties that won seats. See the complete results below.
Prime Minister before	Prime Minister after
P. J. Patterson; PNP	P. J. Patterson; PNP

General elections were held in Jamaica on 18 December 1997. The ruling People's National Party of Prime Minister P. J. Patterson won 50 of the 60 seats defeating the main opposition Jamaica Labour Party.

Future Prime Minister Andrew Holness entered parliament at this election.

== Background ==
Prime Minister P. J. Patterson announced on 27 November that the election would be held on 18 December. Patterson saw this as the right time to go the country as his People's National Party was ahead in the opinion polls, inflation had fallen substantially and the national football team had just qualified for the 1998 World Cup. The previous election in 1993 had seen the People's National Party win 52 of the 60 seats, although in a quarter of the seats the winning margin was less than 1,000 votes.

A record 197 candidates contested the election, with a new political party, the National Democratic Movement, standing in most of the seats. The National Democratic Movement had been founded in 1995 by a former Labour Party chairman, Bruce Golding, after a dispute over the leadership of the Jamaica Labour Party.

== Campaign ==
The election was seen as being mainly between the governing People's National Party and the main opposition Jamaica Labour Party, led by the former Prime Minister Edward Seaga. The economy and violence were the major issues in the election, with the People's National Party maintaining a lead in the polls as the election neared.

The election was mainly free of violence as compared to previous elections, although it began with an incident where rival motorcades from the main parties were fired on. The election was the first in Jamaica where a team of international election monitors attended. The monitors were from the Carter Center and included Jimmy Carter, Colin Powell and former heavyweight boxing world champion Evander Holyfield. Just before the election the two main party leaders made a joint appeal for people to avoid marring the election with violence. Election day itself saw one death and 4 injuries relating to the election, but the 1980 election had seen over 800 deaths.

== Results ==
In winning the election the People's National Party became the first party to win 3 consecutive terms. The opposition Jamaica Labour Party only had 2 more seats in Parliament after the election but their leader Edward Seaga held his seat for a ninth time in a row. The National Democratic Movement failed to win any seats despite a pre-election prediction that they would manage to win a seat.

Party	Votes	%	Seats	+/–
People's National Party	429,805	56.20	50	–2
Jamaica Labour Party	297,387	38.89	10	+2
National Democratic Movement	36,707	4.80	0	New
Independents	885	0.12	0	0
Total	764,784	100.00	60	0
Valid votes	764,784	99.19		
Invalid/blank votes	6,284	0.81		
Total votes	771,068	100.00		
Registered voters/turnout	1,182,294	65.22		
Source: Nohlen
