= Clem Tavares =

Jamaican politician

The Honourable Clem Tavares OJ MP

Deputy Prime Minister of Jamaica
- In office February 1967 – April 1967
- Prime Minister: Donald Sangster
- Preceded by: Donald Sangster
- Succeeded by: Vacant

Member of Parliament for Saint Andrew South Western
- In office 1958–1972
- Succeeded by: Wilton Hill

Personal details
- Born: David Clement Tavares Jr. October 13, 1924 Kingston, Colony of Jamaica
- Died: January 17, 1968 (aged 43)
- Awards: Order of Jamaica (1987)

David Clement Tavares Jr. (13 October 1924 – 17 January 1968) was a Jamaican politician who served as Deputy Prime Minister of Jamaica from February 1967 to April 1967 under Donald Sangster.

Tavares was the Member of Parliament of Saint Andrew South Western in 1959. He also was the Minister of Housing in 1962. His nephew, Tom-Tavares-Finson was the President of the Senate. He died in 1968 at the age of 43 from heart complications. A statue in his honor was unveiled in Payne Avenue, St. Andrew, in October 2023.

== Awards and honours ==
- Order of Jamaica (1987) (posthumous)
