= Jerusalem Bread Foundation =

Jamaican political party

The Jerusalem Bread Foundation was a minor political party in Jamaica.

== History ==
The party was registered by Iduwagayliz Iuwakhidid Itsahyuwan on 7 August 2007 in order to contest the Western Hanover seat in the 2007 elections. Itsahyuwan claimed that he decided to enter politics after "visions and dreams". The party had only three members; Itsahyuwan, his wife and his mother, and Itsahyuwan was the party's only candidate in the elections.

However, the party received just nine votes and failed to win a seat. It was speculated that the party might run again in the 2011 elections, but it did not put forward any candidates.
