= Prime Minister of Jamaica =

Head of government

- Praim Minista a Jumieka
- Emblem of the Prime Minister of Jamaica

- Standard of the Prime Minister of Jamaica

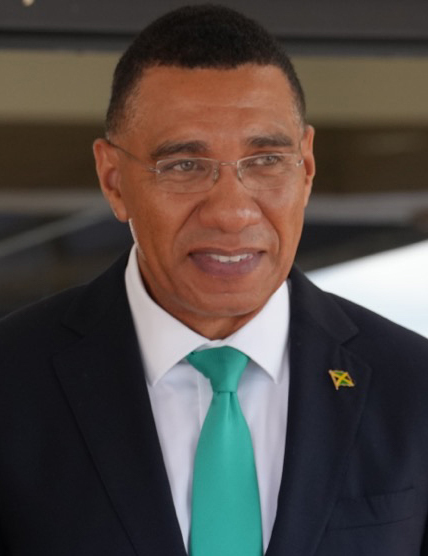
- Incumbent; Andrew Holness since 3 March 2016
- Style: The Most Honourable
- Member of: Cabinet
- Reports to: Governor-General
- Residence: Vale Royal
- Seat: Jamaica House, Kingston
- Appointer: Governor-General
- Term length: 5 years Renewable
- Formation: 6 August 1962
- Unofficial names: ‘Anju’, 'Brogad'
- Deputy: Deputy Prime Minister
- Salary: J$28,587,983 annually
- Website: www.opm.jm

The prime minister of Jamaica (Jamaican Patois: Praim Minista a Jumieka) is Jamaica's head of government, currently Andrew Holness. Holness, as leader of the governing Jamaica Labour Party (JLP), was sworn in as prime minister on 16 September 2025, having been re-elected as a result of the JLP's victory in the 2025 general election.

The prime minister is formally appointed into office by the governor-general, who represents King Charles III.

== Official residence and office ==
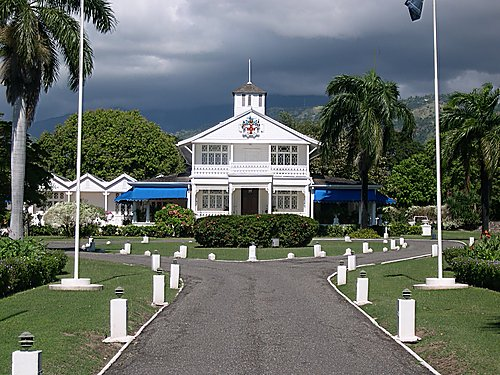
Front Lawns of Vale Royal

The prime minister of Jamaica's official residence is Vale Royal. The property was constructed in 1694 by the planter Sir William Taylor, one of Jamaica's richest men at the time. In 1928 the property was sold to the government and became the official residence of the British colonial secretary (then Sir Reginald Edward Stubbs). Vale Royal has subsequently become the official residence of the prime minister. Vale Royal is not open to the public.

Jamaica House has been the location of the Office of the Prime Minister since 1972. Prime ministers resided there from 1964 until 1980. On 8 November 2022, Prime Minister Andrew Holness said in question time session, that his official residence was Jamaica House rather than Vale Royal, and that Vale Royal was currently in disrepair and possible future uses would be considered after its restoration.

== Chief ministers of Jamaica (1953–1959) ==
No.	Portrait	Chief Minister (Birth–Death)	Term of office			Political party	Election
No.	Portrait	Chief Minister (Birth–Death)	Took office	Left office	Time in office	Political party	Election
1	Sir Alexander Bustamante	Sir Alexander Bustamante (1884–1977)	5 May 1953	2 February 1955	1 year, 273 days	JLP	—
2	Norman Manley	Norman Manley (1893–1969)	2 February 1955	14 August 1959	4 years, 193 days	PNP	1955

== Premiers of Jamaica (1959–1962) ==
No.	Portrait	Premier (Birth–Death)	Term of office			Political party	Election
No.	Portrait	Premier (Birth–Death)	Took office	Left office	Time in office	Political party	Election
1	Norman Manley	Norman Manley (1893–1969)	14 August 1959	29 April 1962	2 years, 258 days	PNP	1959
2	Sir Alexander Bustamante	Sir Alexander Bustamante (1884–1977)	29 April 1962	6 August 1962	99 days	JLP	1962

== Prime ministers of Jamaica (1962–present) ==
Key: † Died in office

No.	Portrait	Prime Minister (Birth–Death)	Term of office			Political party	Election
No.	Portrait	Prime Minister (Birth–Death)	Took office	Left office	Time in office	Political party	Election
1	Sir Alexander Bustamante	Sir Alexander Bustamante (1884–1977)	6 August 1962	23 February 1967	4 years, 201 days	JLP	–
2	Sir Donald Sangster	Sir Donald Sangster (1911–1967)	23 February 1967	11 April 1967 †	47 days	JLP	1967
3	Hugh Shearer	Hugh Shearer (1923–2004)	11 April 1967	2 March 1972	4 years, 326 days	JLP	—
4	Michael Manley	Michael Manley (1924–1997)	2 March 1972	1 November 1980	8 years, 244 days	PNP	1972; 1976
5	Edward Seaga	Edward Seaga (1930–2019)	1 November 1980	10 February 1989	8 years, 101 days	JLP	1980; 1983
(4)	Michael Manley	Michael Manley (1924–1997)	10 February 1989	30 March 1992	3 years, 49 days	PNP	1989
6	P. J. Patterson	P. J. Patterson (born 1935)	30 March 1992	30 March 2006	14 years, 0 days	PNP	1993; 1997; 2002
7	Portia Simpson-Miller	Portia Simpson-Miller (born 1945)	30 March 2006	11 September 2007	1 year, 165 days	PNP	—
8	Bruce Golding	Bruce Golding (born 1947)	11 September 2007	23 October 2011	4 years, 42 days	JLP	2007
9	Andrew Holness	Andrew Holness (born 1972)	23 October 2011	5 January 2012	74 days	JLP	—
(7)	Portia Simpson-Miller	Portia Simpson-Miller (born 1945)	5 January 2012	3 March 2016	4 years, 58 days	PNP	2011
(9)	Andrew Holness	Andrew Holness (born 1972)	3 March 2016	Incumbent	10 years, 188 days	JLP	2016; 2020; 2025

== By tenure ==
Rank by length of terms	Prime Minister	Took office	Left office	Length by time served	Administrations	Elected	Political affiliation
1	P. J. Patterson	30 March 1992	30 March 2006	14 years	1	1993; 1997; 2002	People's National Party
2	Michael Manley	2 March 1972; 10 February 1989	1 November 1980; 30 March 1992	11 years, 292 days (8 years, 244 days; 3 years, 48 days)	2	1972; 1976; 1989	People's National Party
3	Andrew Holness (incumbent)	23 October 2011; 3 March 2016	5 January 2012 present	10 years, 261 days (74 days; 10 years, 188 days)	2	2016; 2020 2025	Jamaica Labour Party
4	Edward Seaga	1 November 1980	10 February 1989	8 years, 101 days	1	1980; 1983	Jamaica Labour Party
5	Portia Simpson Miller	30 March 2006; 5 January 2012	11 September 2007; 3 March 2016	5 years, 223 days (1 year, 165 days; 4 years, 58 days)	2	2011	People's National Party
6	Hugh Shearer	11 April 1967	2 March 1972	4 years, 326 days	1		Jamaica Labour Party
7	Alexander Bustamante	29 April 1962	23 February 1967	4 years, 201 days	1	1962	Jamaica Labour Party
8	Bruce Golding	11 September 2007	23 October 2011	4 years, 42 days	1	2007	Jamaica Labour Party
9	Donald Sangster	23 February 1967	11 April 1967	47 days	1	1967	Jamaica Labour Party

== By education ==
Prime Minister	Term of office	School	University	Degree	Professional training
Alexander Bustamante	1953–1955; 1962–1967	—	—		
Norman Manley	1955–1962	Wolmer's School; Beckford & Smith High School; Jamaica College	University of Oxford (Jesus Coll.)	Law; B.C.L.	Inns of Court: Gray's Inn
Donald Sangster	1967	Munro College	—		Correspondence course in bookkeeping and accounting
Hugh Shearer	1967–1972	St Simon's College	—		
Michael Manley	1980–1980; 1989–1992	Jamaica College	London School of Economics	Economics; B.Sc. 1949	
Edward Seaga	1980–1989	Wolmer's School	Harvard University	Social Sciences; A.B. 1952	
P. J. Patterson	1992–2006	Calabar High School	University College of the West Indies	English; B.A. 1958	Inns of Court: Middle Temple
P. J. Patterson	1992–2006	Calabar High School	London School of Economics	Law; L.L.B. 1963	Inns of Court: Middle Temple
Portia Simpson-Miller	2006–2007; 2012–2016	St Catherine High School; St Martin's High School	Union Institute & University	Public Administration; B.A. 1997	
Bruce Golding	2007–2011	St George's College; Jamaica College	University of the West Indies	Economics; B.Sc. 1969	
Andrew Holness	2011–2012; 2016–present	St Catherine High School	University of the West Indies	Management Studies; B.Sc. Development Studies; M.Sc.	
Andrew Holness	2011–2012; 2016–present	St Catherine High School	Northeastern University	Law and Policy; D.L.P. 2024	

== See also ==
- History of Jamaica
- Politics of Jamaica
- List of governors of Jamaica
- Governor-General of Jamaica
- List of heads of state of Jamaica
- Deputy Prime Minister of Jamaica
- List of prime ministers of Elizabeth II
- List of prime ministers of Charles III
- List of Commonwealth heads of government
- Privy Council of Jamaica
- List of Privy Counsellors (1952–2022)
- List of Privy Counsellors (2022–present)
- Prime Minister of the West Indies Federation
