= Minister of Finance and the Public Service =

Minister of Finance
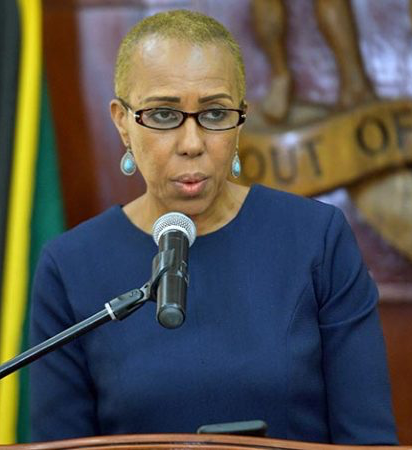
- Incumbent; Fayval Williams since 30 October 2024
- Member of: Cabinet
- Reports to: The Prime Minister
- Seat: Kingston, Jamaica
- Salary: JMD $19,200,000 annually
- Website: mof.gov.jm

The minister of finance and the public service is Jamaica's chief financial official in charge of formulating both monetary and financial policies. They works alongside the Bank of Jamaica and its governor.

It is active in developing financial inclusion policy and is a member of the Alliance for Financial Inclusion.

== Constitutional Responsibilities ==
According to the Constitution of Jamaica, the minister with responsibility for finance should sit on a committee to determine the terms of service (including salary and allowances) of the clerk and deputy clerk of Parliament.

The minister of finance shall, prior to the conclusion of each financial year, prepare and lay before the House of Representatives the annual estimates of revenue and expenditure for public services for the subsequent financial year.

=== Authorisation of expenditure ===
The minister of finance shall, at the earliest convenient moment in each financial year, introduce in the House of Representatives an appropriation bill outlining the estimated expenditures, categorized by service, for the upcoming financial year, excluding statutory expenditures.

Whenever actual or projected expenditures in a financial year exceed the allocated sum for a service or relate to a new service not provided for in the appropriation act, the minister of finance shall prepare and lay before the House of Representatives statements of excess or supplementary estimates for voting. Upon approval, the minister may introduce a supplementary appropriation bill to cover the voted expenditures.

Prior to the end of each financial year, the minister of finance may introduce supplementary appropriation bills to cover approved supplementary expenditures. Following the end of each financial year, the minister shall introduce a final appropriation bill incorporating any previously unaccounted expenditures.

=== Meeting Expenditure ===
If Parliament is dissolved before making necessary provisions for Jamaica's government, the finance minister can issue warrants to pay necessary sums from the Consolidated Fund. This ensures public services continue for up to three months after the House of Representatives reconvenes. The minister must then present a statement of authorized sums to the House for approval, and these sums will be included in the next appropriation bill.

=== Auditor General Department's Audit ===
The minister responsible for finance shall audit and report on the auditor-general's department accounts, following the same procedures as the auditor-general's audits and reports.

== Ministers ==
- Donald Sangster, May 1953 - February 1955
- Noel Newton Nethersole, February 1955 - May 1959
- Vernon Arnett, May 1959 - April 1962
- Donald Sangster, April 1962 - March 1967
- Edward Seaga, March 1967 - March 1972
- David Coore, March 1972 - 1978
- Eric Bell, 1978 - 1980
- Hugh Small, May 1980 - October 1980
- Edward Seaga, 1980 - 1989
- Seymour Mullings, 1989 - 1990
- Percival Patterson, 1990 - 1991
- Hugh Small, 1992 - 1993
- Omar Davies, December 1993 - August 2007
- Audley Shaw, September 2007 – January 2012
- Peter Phillips, January 2012 - March 2016
- Audley Shaw, March 2016 – 26 March 2018
- Nigel A. L. Clarke, 2018 - 29 October 2024
- Fayval Williams 30 October 2024 -

== See also ==
- Ministry of Finance (Trinidad and Tobago)
- Ministry of Economy and Finance (Haiti)
- Ministry of Finance (Dominican Republic)
- Ministry of Finance (Grenada)
- Ministry of Finance (Guyana)
- Ministry of Finance (Suriname)
- Ministry of Economy and Finance (Venezuela)
