= 1962 Jamaican general election =

1962 Jamaica general election
- 10 April 1962
- All 45 seats in the House of Representatives; 23 seats needed for a majority
- Turnout: 72.88% (▲6.79pp)
| Party | Leader | Vote % | Seats | +/– |
|---|---|---|---|---|
| JLP | Alexander Bustamante | 50.04 | 26 | +10 |
| PNP | Norman Manley | 48.59 | 19 | −10 |
This lists parties that won seats. See the complete results below.
| Premier before | Premier after |
|---|---|
| Norman Manley; PNP | Alexander Bustamante; JLP |

General elections were held in Jamaica on 10 April 1962. The result was a victory for the Jamaica Labour Party, which won 26 of the 45 seats. Voter turnout was 73%.

== Results ==
| Party | Votes | % | Seats | +/– |
|---|---|---|---|---|
| Jamaica Labour Party | 288,130 | 50.04 | 26 | +10 |
| People's National Party | 279,771 | 48.59 | 19 | –10 |
| People's Political Party | 4,955 | 0.86 | 0 | New |
| Independents | 2,923 | 0.51 | 0 | 0 |
| Total | 575,779 | 100.00 | 45 | 0 |
| Valid votes | 575,779 | 99.18 | | |
| Invalid/blank votes | 4,738 | 0.82 | | |
| Total votes | 580,517 | 100.00 | | |
| Registered voters/turnout | 796,540 | 72.88 | | |
Source: Nohlen
