= Christian Democratic Party (Jamaica) =

Political party in Jamaica

The Christian Democratic Party was a political party in Jamaica. It first contested national elections in 1972, but received only 109 votes and failed to win a seat. It did not contest any further elections.
