= Luther Buchanan =

Jamaican politician

Luther Buchanan is a Jamaican politician from the People's National Party and former state minister.

== Career ==
Buchanan assumed the role of MP for Westmoreland Eastern in a 2006 by-election following the departure of former Prime Minister P. J. Patterson. He subsequently held the position of State Minister overseeing special projects and rural development within the Prime Minister's Office.

In September 2022, Buchanan resigned as the chairman of the People's National Party (PNP) in Westmoreland Eastern.
