= Donald Sangster =

Jamaican politician (1911-1967)

The Most Honourable Sir Donald Sangster ON GCVO

2nd Prime Minister of Jamaica
- In office 23 February 1967 – 11 April 1967
- Monarch: Elizabeth II
- Governor-General: Clifford Campbell
- Deputy: Clem Tavares
- Preceded by: Alexander Bustamante
- Succeeded by: Hugh Shearer

Deputy Prime Minister of Jamaica
- In office 11 March 1963 – February 1967
- Prime Minister: Alexander Bustamante
- Succeeded by: Clem Tavares

Minister of Finance and the Public Service
- In office May 1953 – February 1955
- Succeeded by: Noel Newton Nethersole
- In office April 1962 – March 1967
- Preceded by: Vernon Arnett
- Succeeded by: David Coore

Personal details
- Born: Donald Burns Sangster; 26 October 1911 Saint Elizabeth, Colony of Jamaica
- Died: 11 April 1967 (aged 55) Montreal, Quebec, Canada
- Party: Jamaica Labour Party
- Profession: Solicitor, businessman

Sir Donald Burns Sangster ON GCVO (26 October 1911 – 11 April 1967) was a Jamaican solicitor and politician, and the second Prime Minister of Jamaica.

== Early life ==
Donald Burns Sangster was born in Black River in the parish of St. Elizabeth, Jamaica. His father William B. Sangster was a land surveyor and a planter. His mother's name is Cassandra Sangster (née Plummer). Sangster attended Munro College in St. Elizabeth.

== Political career ==
He entered politics at the age of 21 in 1933, when he was elected to the Parish Council of St Elizabeth, Jamaica. In 1944 he was elected to the House of Representatives of Jamaica as a member of the Jamaica Labour Party (JLP). He then went on to become Minister of Social Welfare and Labour and later, Minister of Finance. He was appointed as Deputy Prime Minister on 11 March 1963. He became Acting Prime Minister in February 1964 when Prime Minister Sir Alexander Bustamante became ill.

On 21 February, in the 1967 Jamaican general election, the JLP were victorious again, winning 33 out of 53 seats, with the PNP taking 20 seats.

He succeeded Bustamante as Prime Minister on 23 February 1967, and he only had one cabinet meeting before he fell ill less than two weeks later and became the only prime minister to die in office on 11 April, after suffering a subarachnoid haemorrhage.

His face appears on the Jamaican five thousand dollar banknote alongside Hugh Shearer. Sangster International Airport in Montego Bay is named after him.

== Knighthood ==
Sangster was taken ill on 18 March 1967, and was flown by the U.S. government to the Montreal Neurological Institute for specialist treatment. He went into a coma a few weeks later on 1 April, and was knighted by Queen Elizabeth II during that period; he died 10 days later.

== Sources ==
- , The Jamaica Gleaner, 3 September 2007.

Political offices
Preceded by Sir Alexander Bustamante	Prime Minister of Jamaica; 1967	Succeeded by Hugh Shearer
