= Kenneth O. Hall =

Governor-General of Jamaica (born 1941)

The Most Honourable Sir Kenneth O. Hall ON OJ GCMG

5th Governor-General of Jamaica
- In office 16 February 2006 – 26 February 2009
- Monarch: Elizabeth II
- Prime Minister: P. J. Patterson; Portia Simpson-Miller; Bruce Golding
- Preceded by: Howard Cooke
- Succeeded by: Patrick Allen

Personal details
- Born: Kenneth Octavius Hall; 24 April 1941 (age 85) Lucea, Colony of Jamaica
- Spouse: Rheima Hall
- Education: University of the West Indies (BA); Queen's University (MA, PhD)

Academic work
- Discipline: History, International Relations
- School or tradition: Caribbean Historian
- Institutions: University of the West Indies, State University of New York, Syracuse University, Hobart and William Smith Colleges
- Main interests: Caribbean History, Regional Integration, Diplomatic History

Sir Kenneth Octavius Hall ON GCMG OJ (born 24 April 1941) is a former diplomat who served as the governor-general of Jamaica from 16 February 2006 to 26 February 2009. He was Jamaica's fifth governor-general since independence in 1962.

== Early life and education ==
Hall was born in Lucea, Jamaica, and attended Rusea's High School. Hall holds a Bachelor's degree in History, a post-graduate diploma in International Relations, and a PhD in History from Queen's University in Kingston, Ontario, Canada.

== Career ==
Prior to becoming Governor-General, he was a Pro-Vice Chancellor and Principal of the University of the West Indies, Mona Campus. Hall has served in several other positions, including:

- Vice President of Academic Affairs and Faculty Dean – State University of New York at Old Westbury (1989–1994)
- Assistant Provost for Academic Programmes – State University of New York at Albany (1988–1989)
- Assistant Provost – State University of New York at Oswego (1982–1984)
- Faculty Research Associate – Syracuse University (1973–1984)
- Lecturer – University of the West Indies (1972–1973)

He lectured in history at the University of the West Indies and was Professor of History at the State University of New York (SUNY) at Oswego. He was also Adjunct Professor of Caribbean Studies at University at Albany, SUNY in Albany, New York, and Professor of American Studies at State University of New York at Old Westbury.

In 1994, Hall had entered the service of the Caribbean Community (CARICOM) as Deputy Secretary General. In 1996, he assumed the positions of Pro Vice Chancellor and Principal of the Mona Campus, UWI.

On 13 January 2009, it was announced by the Jamaica Information Service that Hall had resigned as Governor-General of Jamaica, citing health reasons. He was succeeded by Patrick Allen, President of the West Indies Union of Seventh-Day Adventists and Chairman of Northern Caribbean University in Jamaica.

== Honours and awards ==
He received the Order of Jamaica, a National Honour, in 2004. He was conferred with Jamaica's second highest national honour, the Order of the Nation, on the occasion of his swearing in. A year and eight months after being appointed Jamaica's fifth Governor-General, Hall was appointed GCMG on 6 November 2007, and received the insignia from Queen Elizabeth II at Buckingham Palace on 30 May 2008.

In 2008, Hall and Lady Rheima Hall received the Collar and Grand Cross of the Order of Civil Merit of Spain, respectively.

Government offices
Preceded by Howard Cooke	Governor General of Jamaica; 2006–2009	Succeeded by Patrick Allen
