= P. J. Patterson =

Jamaican prime minister from 1992 to 2006

The Most Honourable P. J. Patterson ON OCC KC
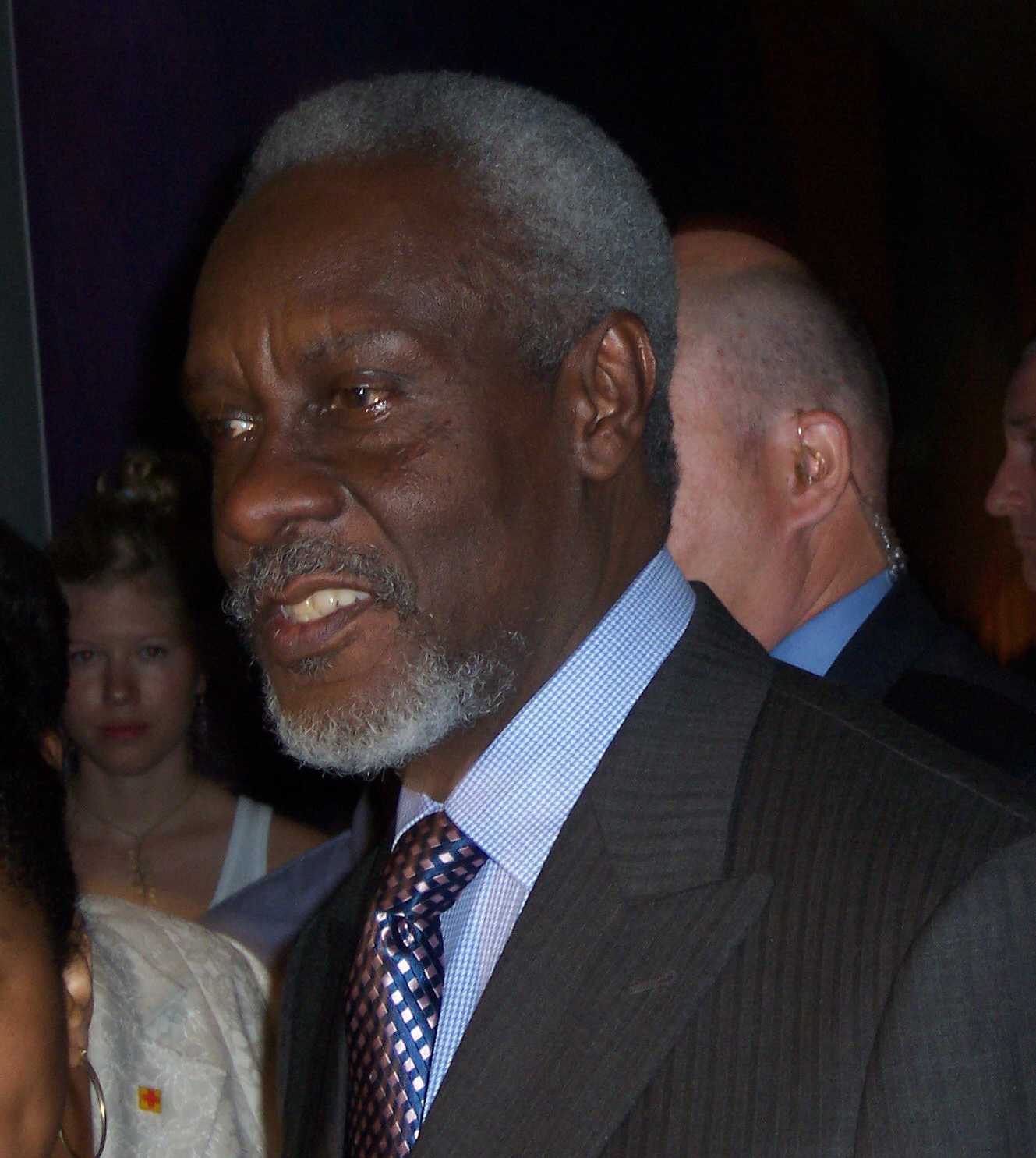
- Patterson in 2005

6th Prime Minister of Jamaica
- In office 30 March 1992 – 30 March 2006
- Monarch: Elizabeth II
- Governors General: Sir Howard Cooke; Sir Kenneth O. Hall
- Deputy: Seymour Mullings (1993–2002)
- Preceded by: Michael Manley
- Succeeded by: Portia Simpson-Miller

Minister of Defence
- In office 30 March 1992 – 30 March 2006
- Prime Minister: Himself
- Preceded by: Michael Manley
- Succeeded by: Portia Simpson-Miller

Deputy Prime Minister of Jamaica
- In office February 1989 – March 1992
- Prime Minister: Michael Manley
- Preceded by: Hugh Shearer
- Succeeded by: Vacant
- In office 1978 – November 1980
- Prime Minister: Michael Manley
- Preceded by: David Coore
- Succeeded by: Hugh Shearer

President of the People's National Party
- In office 30 March 1992 – 30 March 2006
- Prime Minister: Micheal Manley
- Preceded by: Michael Manley
- Succeeded by: Portia Simpson-Miller

Minister of Finance and the Public Service
- In office 1990–1991
- Prime Minister: Michael Manley
- Preceded by: Seymour Mullings
- Succeeded by: Hugh Small

Minister of Foreign Affairs and Foreign Trade
- In office 1978–1980
- Preceded by: Dudley Thompson
- Succeeded by: Hugh Shearer

Personal details
- Born: Percival Noel James Patterson; 10 April 1935 (age 91) Hanover, Colony of Jamaica
- Party: People's National Party (1958–present)
- Spouse: Shirley Field-Ridley (d. 1982)
- Children: 2
- Education: London School of Economics

Percival Noel James Patterson, ON, OCC, KC (born 10 April 1935), popularly known as P. J. Patterson, is a Jamaican former politician who served as the sixth prime minister of Jamaica from 1992 to 2006. He served in office for 14 years, making him the longest-serving prime minister in Jamaica's history. He was the leader of the People's National Party from 1992 to 2006.

Patterson served as the member of Parliament (MP) for the constituency of Westmoreland South Eastern from 1970 to 1980 (when he lost to Euphemia Williams of the Jamaica Labour Party) and again from 1989 to 1993. Following a constituency reorganization, he served as the MP for Westmoreland Eastern from 1993 to 2006. He retired from all of these positions in January 2006.

Cabinet positions he held during his political career include minister of industry and tourism, minister of foreign affairs and foreign trade, minister of development, planning and production, minister of finance and planning.

== Early life and education ==
Patterson was born on 10 April 1935 .Patterson's parents were Henry Patterson, a farmer, and Ina James, a primary school teacher, who both hailed from the Hanover Parish in western Jamaica. He received his secondary education at Kingston's Calabar High School, and pursued higher studies at the University College of West Indies and later the London School of Economics.

As an undergraduate at the University of the West Indies (UWI), he served as Chairman of UWI'S External Affairs Commission, where he gained exposure to world leaders and international political thought through attendance at a number of international student fora. It was also at UWI that he became committed to Caribbean regionalism and to the causes of countries of the developing world. In 1958, he graduated with a B.A. (Honours) in English.

His time as a Law student of the London School of Economics consolidated his foundation in international politics and was awarded the Leverhume Scholarship, and the Sir Hughes Parry prize for Excellence in the Law of Contracts. While enrolled at the Inns of Court (Middle Temple), he and several of his fellow students were to become future leaders of the countries of the developing world.

== Early political life ==
Patterson joined the organising staff of the People's National Party (PNP) in 1958, and he became a member of the party's National and Executive Councils in 1964. Patterson entered the Parliament of Jamaica as an Opposition Senator in 1969, appointed by Opposition Leader Norman Manley. He was elected the youngest ever Vice President of the PNP later that year at age 33.

When in 1969 his predecessor as Prime Minister of Jamaica, Michael Manley, launched his campaign for the Presidency of the PNP, he turned to P. J. Patterson, youngest of the highest-ranking segment of the party executive, to lead his campaign. This was the beginning of a partnership which endured over the next 23 years, and allowed for an exchange of political ideas and perspectives that proved beneficial to both.

Patterson was elected the Member of Parliament for Westmoreland South Eastern in the constituency's by-election of 1970. The constituency borders were reorganized prior to the general election of 1993 and he was elected as the Member of Parliament for Westmoreland Eastern in that election, a seat he held until his retirement in 2006.

He was a campaign manager for the PNP's bid for power in the General Elections of 1972, demonstrating skill as a political organizer that played a significant role in the party's victory at the polls that year. This led to his first appointment to the Jamaican Cabinet as Minister of Industry, Trade and Tourism. From 1978 to 1980, Patterson served as deputy prime minister and Minister of Foreign Affairs and Foreign Trade.

The PNP were voted out of power in 1980, and Patterson lost his seat to Euphemia Williams. However, in 1983, he was elected party chairman, and the PNP won by a landslide in 1989, and Patterson was back as deputy prime minister. From 1989 to 1990, Patterson was also Minister of Development, Planning and Production, and from 1990 to 1991, he was Minister of Finance and Planning.

== Premiership ==
He assumed office as Prime Minister after Michael Manley retired in 1992, at a time when the Caribbean island nation was facing the formidable challenge of securing a place in a new global order of economic liberalization and deregulation. In the 1993 Jamaican general election, held on March 30, Patterson led the PNP to a second consecutive victory in the polls, winning 52 of the 60 seats up for grabs, defeating former prime minister Edward Seaga of the Jamaica Labour Party.

Patterson led efforts to strengthen the country's social protection and security systems—a critical element of his economic and social policy agenda to mitigate, reduce poverty and social deprivation.

In the 1997 Jamaican general election, Patterson led the PNP to a third consecutive victory, breaking the "third-term barrier". The PNP won 50 of the 60 seats available.

His massive investments in modernization of Jamaica's infrastructure and restructuring of the country's financial sector are widely credited with having led to Jamaica's greatest period of investment in tourism, mining, ICT and energy since the 1960s. He also ended Jamaica's 18-year borrowing relationship with the International Monetary Fund, allowing the country greater latitude in pursuit of its economic policies. In 2002, when Patterson led the PNP to another general election victory, but with a much-reduced majority of 34 out of 60 seats. He became the first Jamaican prime minister to be sworn in for a fourth consecutive term.

In September 2003, Patterson told a party conference that he wanted Jamaica to be a republic by the time he left office in 2007, saying "The majority of people in Jamaica are ready to consign to history the last vestiges of colonialism". Patterson had long supported moves to make Jamaica a republic, but he was unsuccessful in this aim, as Jamaica is still a monarchy. In 2012, he expressed his frustration that a republic had still not come into being

He made international headlines in 2004 when, as Chairman of CARICOM, he led the regional organization in the decision to refuse recognition of the Gérard Latortue government in Haiti following the removal of the democratically elected Jean-Bertrand Aristide from office. Patterson arranged for Aristide to take up temporary residence in Jamaica during Aristide's lawsuit against the United States and France accusing the countries of kidnapping him.

In one of his final initiatives as Prime Minister, he launched a program of radical transformation of the island's education system aimed at development of quality human capital equipped to succeed in the competitive global economy. In addition, Patterson presided over a significant decline in poverty during his time in office.

Patterson retired as prime minister on 30 January 2006, and he was succeeded as PM by Portia Simpson-Miller. He was succeeded as MP by Luther Buchanan.

== Post-premiership ==
Following his premiership, from 2006 to 2007, he chaired the Committee on Commonwealth Membership, which presented its report on potential changes in membership criteria for the Commonwealth of Nations at the Commonwealth Heads of Government Meeting 2007 in Kampala, Uganda.

== International service ==
Patterson is a member of the Club of Madrid, a group that consists of more than 100 former presidents and prime ministers of democratic countries, which works to strengthen democracy and democratic leadership worldwide.

Patterson has contributed to numerous Conventions and Statements in the international arena including the Valletta Statement on Multilateral Trade and the Gozo Statement on Vulnerable Small States. These have helped to shape north–south relationship and influence the negotiating position of developing countries.

He is a member of the Global Leadership Foundation, an NGO composed of a number of former statesmen, ex-presidents and prime ministers founded in 2004 by former State President of South Africa and Nobel Prize laureate, the late F. W. de Klerk. The Global Leadership Foundation is an organization which works to support democratic leadership, prevent and resolve conflict through mediation and promote good governance in the form of democratic institutions, open markets, human rights and the rule of law. It does so by making available, discreetly and in confidence, the experience of former leaders to today's national leaders. It is a not-for-profit organization composed of former heads of government, senior governmental and international organization officials who work closely with Heads of Government on governance-related issues of concern to them.

He played a seminal role in the process that marked the transition from the first steps in integration of the Caribbean region to the founding of CARIFTA and its evolution into CARICOM. He drew upon his expertise in law and trade, to steer the regional body toward the development of a Caribbean jurisprudence through the Caribbean Court of Justice, and a borderless regional economy through the CARICOM Single Market, which came to fruition in 2005 and 2006 respectively.

During his tenure as Jamaica's foreign minister he served as president of the ACP/EU Ministerial Council and led negotiations for the ACP group of countries with the European Community. As chairman of the ACP/EEC Ministerial Conference, he played a pivotal role in forging an agreement on the basic framework for the original Lomé Convention, which influenced the outcome of subsequent negotiations that led to the Convention signed in 1975. He has served as president and spokesman of the ACP Ministerial Council on a number of occasions.

A passionate opponent of apartheid, he was an ardent proponent of South Africa's liberation movement.

== Memberships and awards ==
Upon becoming the prime minister of Jamaica in 1992, Patterson was invested with the Order of the Nation, allowing him to be known as "The Most Honourable" and to use the post-nominal letters "ON".

In 2006, he was invested with the Order of Excellence of Guyana, allowing him to use the post-nominal letters "OE". On 2 July 2009 he invested with the Order of the Caribbean Community allowing him to use the post-nominal letters "OCC".

On 13 April 2022, Patterson resigned as a Privy Council member.

Party political offices
Preceded by Michael Manley	Leader of the People's National Party; 1992–2006	Succeeded by Portia Simpson-Miller
Political offices
Preceded by Michael Manley	Prime Minister of Jamaica; 1992–2006	Succeeded by Portia Simpson-Miller
