= 1993 Jamaican general election =

1993 Jamaica general election
← 1989	30 March 1993	1997 →
- All 60 seats in the House of Representatives; 31 seats needed for a majority
- Turnout: 67.35% (▼11.03pp)
Party	Leader	Vote %	Seats	+/–
PNP	P. J. Patterson	59.98	52	+7
JLP	Edward Seaga	39.43	8	−7
This lists parties that won seats. See the complete results below.
Prime Minister before	Prime Minister after
P. J. Patterson; PNP	P. J. Patterson; PNP

General elections were held in Jamaica on 30 March 1993. The result was a victory for the People's National Party, which won 52 of the 60 seats. Voter turnout was 67%.

== Results ==
Party	Votes	%	Seats	+/–
People's National Party	401,131	59.98	52	+7
Jamaica Labour Party	263,711	39.43	8	–7
Independents	3,975	0.59	0	0
Total	668,817	100.00	60	0
Valid votes	668,817	99.04		
Invalid/blank votes	6,479	0.96		
Total votes	675,296	100.00		
Registered voters/turnout	1,002,599	67.35		
Source: Nohlen
