= Portia Simpson-Miller =

Prime Minister of Jamaica (2006–2007, 2012–2016)

The Most Honourable Portia Simpson-Miller ON
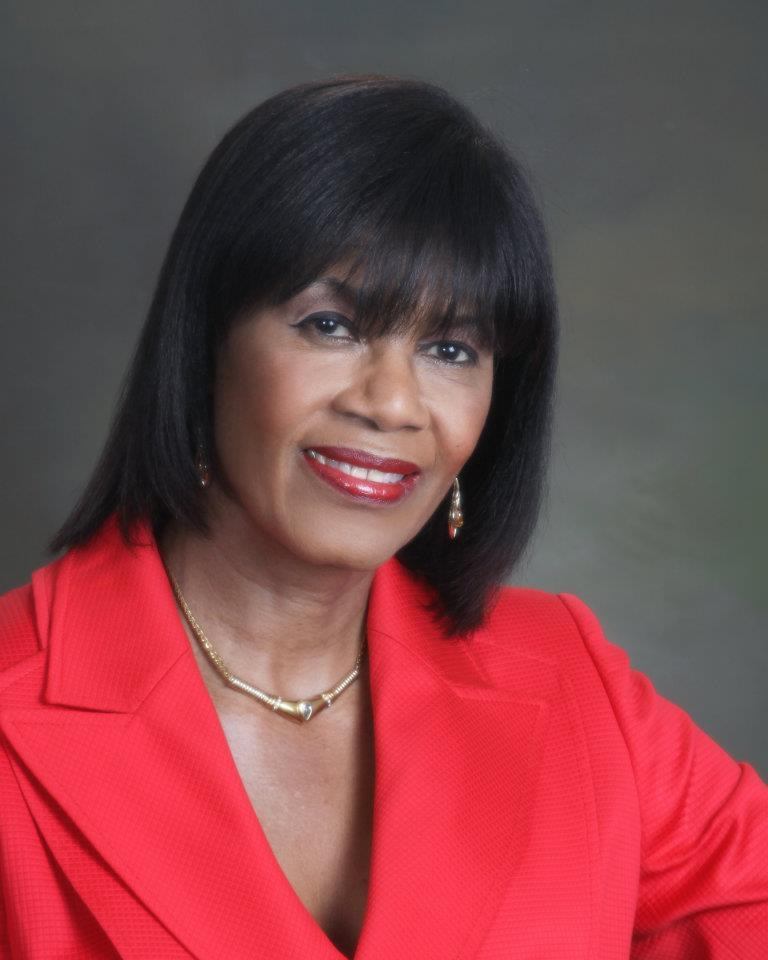
- Simpson-Miller in 2011

7th Prime Minister of Jamaica
- In office 5 January 2012 – 3 March 2016
- Monarch: Elizabeth II
- Governor-General: Patrick Allen
- Deputy: Peter Phillips
- Preceded by: Andrew Holness
- Succeeded by: Andrew Holness
- In office 30 March 2006 – 11 September 2007
- Monarch: Elizabeth II
- Governor-General: Kenneth Hall
- Preceded by: P. J. Patterson
- Succeeded by: Bruce Golding

Leader of the Opposition
- In office 3 March 2016 – 2 April 2017
- Prime Minister: Andrew Holness
- Preceded by: Andrew Holness
- Succeeded by: Peter Phillips
- In office 11 September 2007 – 5 January 2012
- Prime Minister: Bruce Golding; Andrew Holness
- Preceded by: Bruce Golding
- Succeeded by: Andrew Holness

President of the People's National Party
- In office 30 March 2005 – 26 March 2017
- Preceded by: P. J. Patterson
- Succeeded by: Peter Phillips

Personal details
- Born: Portia Lucretia Simpson; 12 December 1945 (age 80) Wood Hall, Jamaica
- Party: People's National Party
- Spouse: Errald Miller (m. 1998)
- Education: Union Institute and University

Portia Lucretia Simpson-Miller ON (born 12 December 1945) is a Jamaican politician who served as Prime Minister of Jamaica from 2006 to 2007 and from 2012 to 2016. She was leader of the People's National Party from 2005 to 2017 and Leader of the Opposition from 2007 to 2012 and from 2016 to 2017.

While serving as prime minister, Simpson-Miller retained the positions of minister of defence, development, information and sports. She has also served as minister of labour, social security and sport, minister of tourism and sports and minister of local government throughout her political career. Following her election win in December 2011, when her party defeated the Jamaica Labour Party, she became the second individual since independence to have served non-consecutive terms as prime minister, the first having been Michael Manley. The People's National Party under her leadership lost the 25 February 2016 general election by only one seat to the Andrew Holness-led Jamaica Labour Party. One political commentator described the poll as "the closest election Jamaica has ever had". Following this defeat, Simpson-Miller stepped down in 2017.

Simpson-Miller was ranked by Time as one of the 100 most influential people in the world in 2012. In 2011, she was named Person of the Year by The Gleaner and Observer.

== Early life and education ==
Simpson-Miller was born Portia Lucretia Simpson in Wood Hall, St Catherine, in 1945. Her parents were Ethlyn Tulloch and Zedekiah Simpson. She later said her father named her after Portia from William Shakespeare's play, The Merchant of Venice. She attended Marlie Hill Primary School, which was destroyed by Hurricane Charlie in 1951 and relocated to the nearby community of Bellfield. She attended St Catherine High School before the family moved to Gem Road, Kingston. There, Simpson Miller attended St Martin's High School, which was located on Upper Ivy Road, Kingston.

In 1997, Simpson-Miller graduated with a Bachelor of Arts in Public Administration from the Union Institute & University, a low-residency university headquartered in Cincinnati, Ohio, in the United States. At the time, she was a cabinet minister.

== Political career ==
Simpson-Miller was first elected to the Kingston and St. Andrew Corporation (KSAC) in the 1974 local government elections, representing Trench Town West as a People's National Party (PNP) councillor.

Simpson-Miller was elected as a Member of Parliament (MP) in the 1976 general election, representing St Andrew South Western. She was not reelected in 1983, as the PNP boycotted the elections, but was reelected in the constituency in the 1989 general election.

Simpson-Miller served as Minister of Labour, Welfare and Sports from 1989 to 1993. She was Minister of Labour and Welfare from 1993 to 1995, Minister of Labour, Social Security and Sports from 1995 to February 2000, Minister of Tourism and Sports from February 2000 to October 2002, and Minister of Local Government and Sport since October 2002.

She served as Vice President of the PNP from 1978 to 2006, when she became its president. In the PNP's internal vote to elect P. J. Patterson's successor, held on 26 February 2006, she received 1,775 votes, while her nearest rival, then security minister Dr. Peter Phillips, took 1,538 votes. She garnered approximately 47% of the delegates' vote, making her the first PNP president to be elected by less than half of eligible delegates. In July 2008, Simpson-Miller was challenged for the presidency of the PNP by Phillips. The election was held among the party's delegates on 20 September. She was re-elected as the head of the PNP for her second consecutive year, defeating him by an even wider margin than that of the previous election.

=== Prime minister ===
Simpson-Miller replaced Patterson as prime minister on 30 March 2006, becoming the first female head of government of the nation and the third in the Anglophone Caribbean, following Eugenia Charles of Dominica and Janet Jagan of Guyana. In organising the cabinet following her swearing-in, she assumed the portfolio of defence minister.

==== 2007 elections ====
On 3 September 2007, Simpson-Miller's party narrowly lost the general election, retaining 27 seats against the Jamaica Labour Party's 33 seats. This margin was revised to 32–28 after recounts and an election petition decision concerning the eligibility of a government MP who had dual citizenship. This election ended 18 years of PNP rule, and Bruce Golding became the new prime minister.

The loss can in part be attributed to a well planned and executed campaign by the JLP. A part of their campaign strategy was a media blitz that claimed to highlight 18 years of neglect under the PNP and the incompetence of Simpson-Miller as a leader. One advertisement highlighted the deplorable conditions in Simpson-Miller's own constituency of South West St. Andrew while others were created from controversial interviews and still others discussed issues surrounding her competence as a leader.

Simpson-Miller initially refused to concede defeat, alleging voting irregularities and the possibility that recounts would change the final result. The Organization of American States issued a statement declaring the election free and fair. "I believe this election can stand international scrutiny," said OAS assistant secretary-general Albert Ramdin, who led a team of international observers who monitored the election. She conceded defeat on 5 September. On 11 September, Simpson Miller was succeeded as prime minister by JLP leader Bruce Golding. In 2011, Golding resigned, making way for Andrew Holness to become the 9th prime minister of Jamaica.

==== 2011 election ====
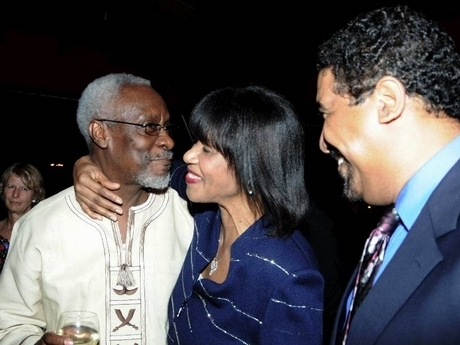
Portia Simpson-Miller with P. J. Patterson and Wykeham McNeill in 2011

On 5 December 2011, Holness asked the Governor-General, Sir Patrick Allen, to dissolve parliament and call an election, despite the fact that elections were not constitutionally necessary until September 2012. The date of the 2011 election was set as 29 December and major local media outlets viewed the election as "too close to call". However, as Simpson-Miller campaigned in key constituencies, the gap widened to favour the PNP. Days before the election, Simpson-Miller came out fully in favour of LGBT rights in a televised debate, sparking an eleventh-hour controversy ahead of the vote.

In early vote counting on 29 December, it was apparent that the PNP was winning a large number of swing constituencies. By evening, the Jamaica Observer had declared 41 of 63 constituencies for the PNP. The election results were officially declared by the Electoral Office on 5 January and, upon the request of the governor general, Simpson-Miller formed the new Jamaican government.

In the 2011 Jamaican general election, the number of seats had been increased to 63, and the PNP swept to power with a landslide 42 seats to the JLP's 21. The voter turnout was 53.17%.

==== 2016 elections ====
In the 2016 Jamaican general election on 25 February, Simpson-Miller lost to Andrew Holness by a narrow margin that resulted in a recount, which granted the PNP an additional seat, resulting in a one-seat loss; the PNP won 31 seats to the JLP's 32. As a result, Simpson-Miller became Opposition Leader for a second time. The voter turnout dipped below 50% for the first time, registering just 48.37%.

Following calls from within her own party for her to step down as party leader, Simpson-Miller announced she would not seek re-election on 4 December 2016. She was replaced by Peter Phillips, the Shadow Minister of Finance and former rival, on 26 March 2017. She stepped down as an MP in June 2017.

== Political positions ==
Simpson-Miller supports Jamaican republicanism, and has endorsed replacing the Jamaican monarchy with an elected president. Simpson-Miller has reportedly pledged to transform Jamaica into a republic as part of the 50th anniversary of the island's independence. Simpson-Miller has occasionally been labelled as a populist.

After ambivalence during her first term in office, Simpson-Miller became the first head of government in Jamaican history to formally endorse civil rights for lesbian, gay, bisexual and transgender citizens during an election campaign. Simpson-Miller noted during an election debate that she "has no problem giving certain positions of authority to a homosexual as long as they show the necessary level of competence for the post." She expressed that equality within a nation for all people is of utmost importance. During her premiership, Simpson-Miller received some scrutiny from foreign LGBT organisations and commentators following the murder of Dwayne Jones for what they saw as lack of action by her government against anti-homosexual violence despite her pledge to improve conditions for LGBT Jamaicans.

== Personal life ==
In 1998, Simpson married Errald Miller, a business executive and former CEO of Cable & Wireless Jamaica Ltd. On 29 May 2006 she was vested with the Jamaican Order of the Nation, giving her (and her husband) the title "The Most Honourable".

Simpson-Miller is also known as "Sista P" or "Mama P".

== Honours ==
- Simpson-Miller was ranked by Time as one of the 100 most influential people in the world in 2012.
- Simpson-Miller was named Person of the Year by The Gleaner and Observer in the Gleaner awards 2011.

Simpson-Miller is a member of the Council of Women World Leaders, an international network of current and former female presidents and prime ministers.

Simpson-Miller, in 2013, was elected vice-president of Socialist International following a conference in Cape Town, South Africa.

Simpson Miller was honoured with one of Cuba’s highest awards – the Medal of Friendship in 2025.

Simpson-Miller has received the following honorary doctorates:

- Honorary doctor of humane letters from Union Institute & University in 2001.
- Honorary doctor of public service from Northern Caribbean University in 2012.
- Honorary doctor of laws from the University of the West Indies in 2017.

== See also ==
- Cabinet of Jamaica
- Women in the House of Representatives of Jamaica
- Skard, Torild (2014) Portia Simpson-Miller, Women of Power – Half a century of female presidents and prime ministers worldwide Bristol: Policy Press. ISBN 978-1-44731-578-0.

Party political offices
Preceded by Percival Patterson	Leader of the People's National Party; 2006–2017	Succeeded by Peter Phillips
Political offices
Preceded by Percival Patterson	Prime Minister of Jamaica; 2006–2007	Succeeded by Bruce Golding
Preceded by Bruce Golding	Leader of the Opposition; 2007–2012	Succeeded by Andrew Holness
Preceded by Andrew Holness	Prime Minister of Jamaica; 2012–2016	Succeeded by Andrew Holness
Preceded by Andrew Holness	Leader of the Opposition; 2016–2017	Succeeded by Peter Phillips
