= Hugh Shearer =

3rd Prime Minister of Jamaica (1967–72)

The Most Honourable Hugh Shearer ON OJ PC
- Prime Minister Shearer in the Oval Office, 11 August 1970

3rd Prime Minister of Jamaica
- In office 11 April 1967 – 2 March 1972
- Monarch: Elizabeth II
- Governor-General: Sir Clifford Campbell
- Preceded by: Sir Donald Sangster
- Succeeded by: Michael Manley

Leader of the Jamaica Labour Party
- In office 1967 – November 1974
- Preceded by: Donald Sangster
- Succeeded by: Edward Seaga

Deputy Prime Minister of Jamaica
- In office November 1980 – February 1989
- Prime Minister: Edward Seaga
- Preceded by: P. J. Patterson
- Succeeded by: P. J. Patterson

Ministry of Foreign Affairs and Foreign Trade
- In office 1980–1989
- Prime Minister: Edward Seaga
- Preceded by: P. J. Patterson
- Succeeded by: David Coore

Personal details
- Born: Hugh Lawson Shearer; 18 May 1923 Martha Brae, Trelawny, Colony of Jamaica
- Died: 15 July 2004 (aged 81) Kingston, Jamaica
- Party: Jamaica Labour Party
- Spouses: Lunette Shearer (m. 1947; div. 1997); Denise Eldemire (m. 1998)
- Children: 5
- Education: Howard University School of Law

Hugh Lawson Shearer ON OJ PC (18 May 1923 – 15 July 2004) was a Jamaican trade unionist and politician, who served as the 3rd Prime Minister of Jamaica, from 1967 to 1972. He was also Deputy Prime Minister and Minister of Foreign Affairs and Foreign Trade from 1980 to 1989, under Edward Seaga.

== Early life and education ==
Shearer was born in Martha Brae, Trelawney, Jamaica, which is located just south of the parish capital of Falmouth. His father was James Shearer, a former soldier, and his mother was Esther Lindo, a dressmaker.

Shearer attended St Simon's College after winning a parish scholarship to the school and later received an honorary LLD from Howard University School of Law.

== Trade union career ==
In 1941, he took a job on the staff of a weekly trade union newspaper, the Jamaican Worker. His first political promotion came in 1943, when Sir Alexander Bustamante, founder of the Jamaican Labour Party (JLP), took over editorship of the paper and took Shearer under his wing. Shearer continued to get promotion after promotion within the union and acquired a Government Trade Union scholarship in 1947.

He was appointed Island Supervisor of Bustamante's trade union, BITU, and shortly afterwards elected vice-president of the union.

== Political career ==
Shearer was elected to the House of Representatives of Jamaica as member for Western Kingston in 1955, an office he retained for the next four years until he was defeated in the 1959 elections.

Shearer was a member of the Senate from 1962 to 1967, at the same time filling the role of Jamaica's chief spokesman on foreign affairs as Deputy Chief of Mission at the United Nations. In 1967 he was elected as member for Southern Clarendon and, after the death of Sir Donald Sangster, appointed Prime Minister on 11 April 1967.

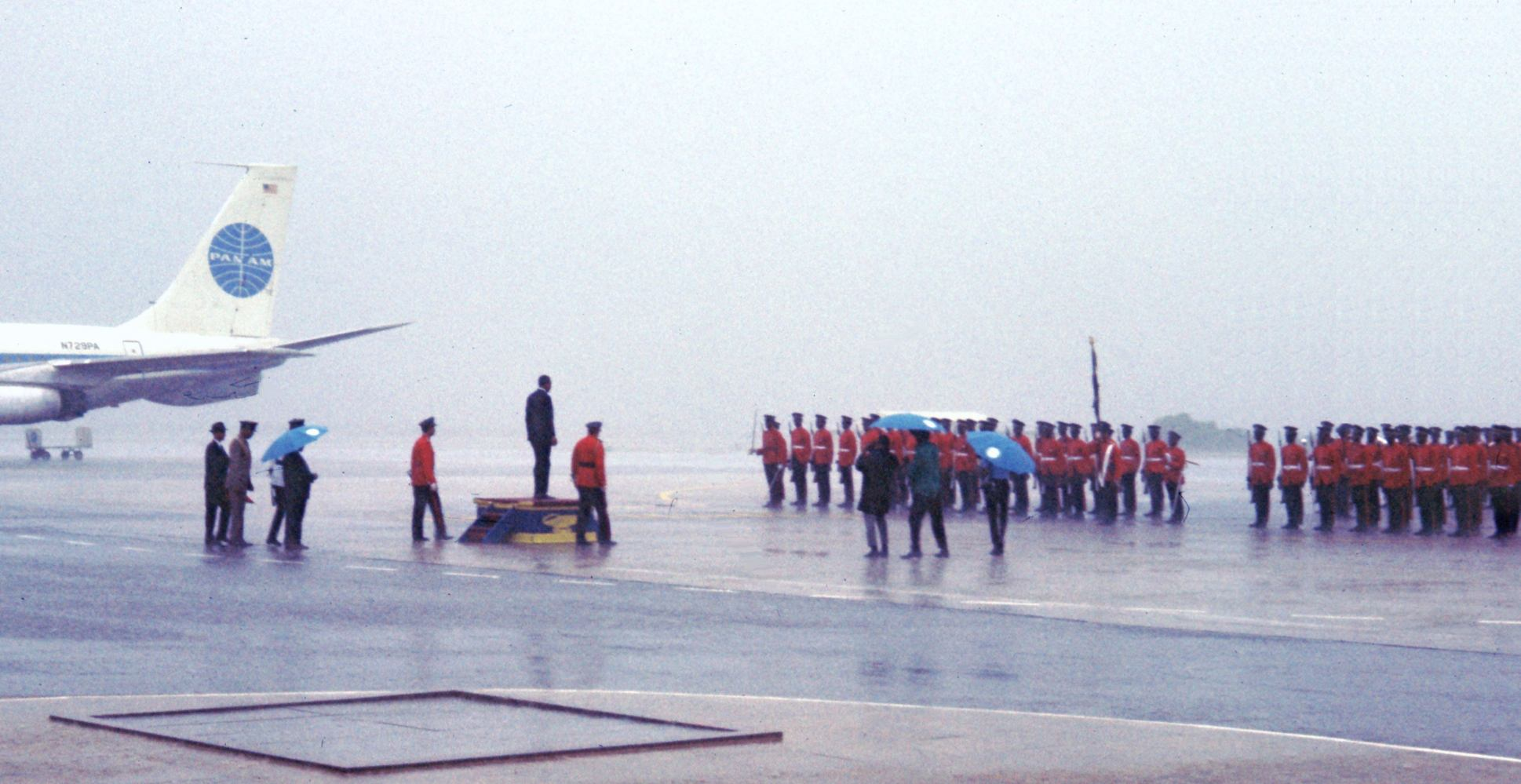
Hugh Shearer (on platform), while Prime Minister, giving an impromptu speech at Palisadoes Airport, Kingston, to members of the Jamaica Defence Force, during a light rainstorm.

Thanks to his work with the Jamaican Worker earlier in his life, Shearer managed to stay on generally good terms with the Jamaican working class, and was generally well liked by the populace. However, he did cause an outcry of anger in October 1968 when his government banned the historian, Walter Rodney from re-entering the country. On 16 October a series of riots, known as the Rodney Riots broke out, after peaceful protest by students from the University of the West Indies campus at Mona, was suppressed by police; rioting spreading throughout Kingston. Shearer stood by the ban claiming that Rodney was a danger to Jamaica, citing his socialist ties, trips to Cuba and the USSR, as well as his radical Black nationalism.

Shearer was generally uncomfortable with notions of pan-Africanism or militant black nationalism. He was also insecure about the stability of newly independent Jamaica in the late 1960s.

His term as prime minister was a prosperous one for Jamaica, with three new alumina refineries were built, along with three large tourist resorts. These six buildings formed the basis of Jamaica's mining and tourism industries, the two biggest earners for the country.

Shearer's term was also marked by a great upswing in secondary school enrollment after an intense education campaign on his part. Fifty new schools were constructed.

It was by pressure from Shearer that the Law of the Sea Authority chose Kingston to house its headquarters.

In the 1972 Jamaican general election, the JLP was defeated by 37 seats to 16 seats, and the People's National Party leader, Michael Manley, became prime minister.

In 1974, Shearer was replaced as leader of the JLP by Edward Seaga, because it was said that white and light skin brown Jamaican upper class even resented the fact that the Jamaica Labour Party had a darker skin leader. Between 1980 and 1989, during the prime ministership of Seaga, Shearer was deputy prime minister and minister of foreign affairs.

== Personal life ==
Hugh Shearer, while working as a journalist, married his first wife Lunette, an accounting clerk, on 7 October 1947. They purchased a property at Chisholm Avenue where they lived, until Mr. Shearer left the matrimonial home.

Shearer was separated from his first wife, with whom he had three children, by the time he became prime minister in 1967.

Hugh Shearer married his second wife, Dr. Denise Eldemire, on 28 August 1998. She is the daughter of the late Dr. Herbert Eldemire, who served as Jamaica's first Health Minister from 1962 to 1972. The couple were married for nearly 6 years, until his death in July 2004

== Death and legacy ==
He died at his home in Kingston on 15 July 2004, at the age of 81. He was survived by his wife, sons Corey Alexander, Howard, Lance and Donald, and daughters Hope, Hilary, Heather, Mischka Garel, and Ana Margaret Sanchez.

On 14 May 2009, the Bank of Jamaica announced a plan to issue a JA$5000 note with the likeness of Shearer on it, as was explained in detail on Monday 18 May 2009 by the Governor of Jamaica's Central Bank Derick Milton Latibeaudiere.

The $5000 bill with Hugh Shearer's portrait was put in circulation on 24 September 2009. In Jamaican slang, a $5000 banknote is referred to as a Shearer. Since 2023, Donald Sangster has been featured on the $5000 bill alongside Shearer.

== Sources ==
- Neita, Hartley, 2005. Hugh Shearer; A Voice for the People. Kingston, Jamaica: Ian Randle Publishers, The Institute of Jamaica.
- Senior, Olive, 2003. Encyclopaedia of Jamaican Heritage.
- Image "shearer", 27 August 2013: shearer – Jamaica Information Service

Political offices
Preceded by Sir Donald Sangster	Prime Minister of Jamaica; 1967–1972	Succeeded by Michael Manley
Trade union offices
Preceded by Alexander Bustamante	President of the Bustamante Industrial Trade Union; 1977–2004	Succeeded by Rudyard Spencer
