= 1976 Jamaican general election =

1976 Jamaica general election
← 1972	15 December 1976	1980 →
- All 60 seats in the House of Representatives; 31 seats needed for a majority
- Turnout: 85.21% (▲6.33pp)
Party	Leader	Vote %	Seats	+/–
PNP	Michael Manley	56.77	47	+10
JLP	Edward Seaga	43.23	13	−3
This lists parties that won seats. See the complete results below.
Prime Minister before	Prime Minister after
Michael Manley; PNP	Michael Manley; PNP

General elections were held in Jamaica on 15 December 1976. The result was a victory for the People's National Party, which won 47 of the 60 seats. Voter turnout was 85%.

== Results ==
Party	Votes	%	Seats	+/–
People's National Party	417,768	56.77	47	+10
Jamaica Labour Party	318,180	43.23	13	–3
Total	735,948	100.00	60	+7
Valid votes	735,948	99.16		
Invalid/blank votes	6,201	0.84		
Total votes	742,149	100.00		
Registered voters/turnout	870,972	85.21		
Source: Nohlen
