= Bruce Golding =

Prime Minister of Jamaica from 2007 to 2011

The Most Honourable Bruce Golding ON OJ
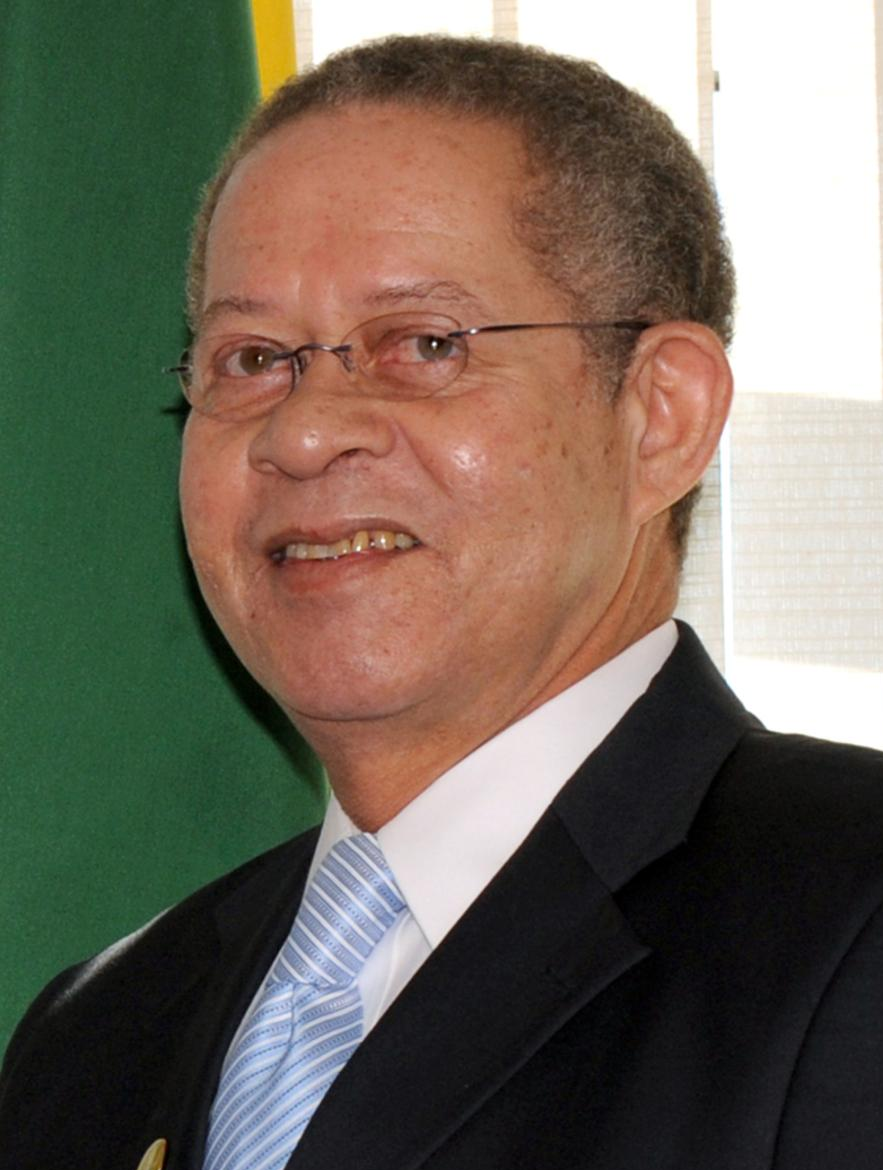

8th Prime Minister of Jamaica
- In office 11 September 2007 – 23 October 2011
- Monarch: Elizabeth II
- Governors General: Sir Kenneth Hall; Sir Patrick Allen
- Deputy: Kenneth Baugh
- Preceded by: Portia Simpson-Miller
- Succeeded by: Andrew Holness

Leader of the Jamaica Labour Party
- In office 21 January 2005 – 20 November 2011
- Preceded by: Edward Seaga
- Succeeded by: Andrew Holness

Leader of the Opposition
- In office 21 January 2005 – 11 September 2007
- Prime Minister: P. J. Patterson; Portia Simpson-Miller
- Preceded by: Edward Seaga
- Succeeded by: Portia Simpson-Miller

Member of Parliament for Kingston West
- In office 21 January 2005 – 29 December 2011
- Preceded by: Edward Seaga
- Succeeded by: Desmond McKenzie

Personal details
- Born: 5 December 1947 (age 78) Chapelton, Colony of Jamaica
- Party: Labour Party (1969–1995, 2002–present)
- Other political affiliations: NDM (1995–2002)
- Spouse: Lorna Golding (m. 1972)
- Children: Sherene Golding Campbell, Steven Golding, Ann-Merita Golding
- Education: St. George's College; University of the West Indies (BSc)

Orette Bruce Golding (born 5 December 1947) is a Jamaican former politician who served as eighth Prime Minister of Jamaica from 11 September 2007 to 23 October 2011. He is a member of the Jamaica Labour Party (JLP), which he led from 2005 to his resignation in 2011.

== Biography ==
=== Early life ===
He is the son of Tacius Golding and Enid Golding (née Bent), both teachers. Bruce was the third of four children: the second—the only girl—died shortly after birth. In 1949, when he was only two years old, his family moved to St. Faiths district near Browns Hall, St. Catherine, where he spent the next five years. In 1955, his mother accepted a teaching post at Alpha Academy in Kingston. This necessitated that the family relocate to Kingston.

As a child, Golding grew up in a political environment. He was only two years old in 1949 when his father was first elected as a Member of the House of Representatives for West St. Catherine, a seat that he retained for 22 years until his retirement in 1972. Tacius Golding was the first Speaker of the House in independent Jamaica and also served as Parliamentary Secretary in the Ministry of Housing.

=== Education ===
Golding spent five years at St. George's College, and later transferred to Jamaica College to pursue A-Level studies. In April 1966, Golding served as the school's head boy, and as such, was a member of the party that welcomed Emperor Haile Selassie I of Ethiopia to Jamaica College.

He entered the University of the West Indies (UWI) in 1966 and graduated in 1969 with a BSc degree in Economics (2nd-class Honours), majoring in public administration.

=== Politics ===
Golding was the chairman of the Jamaica Labour Party (JLP) before he and others felt the need to split and form a new party, the National Democratic Movement (NDM), in 1995. In 2002, he rejoined the JLP and in November 2003 was again elected chairman of the party.

He was elected leader of the JLP, and also the leader of the opposition, on 20 February 2005, succeeding Edward Seaga.

Golding represented three different constituencies as a Member of Parliament: West St. Catherine, Central St. Catherine, and Kingston West. While serving as prime minister, Golding and also hosted Jamaica House Live, a monthly talk show.

== 1990 "Spy Scandal" chairmanship and the "Gang of Five" crisis ==
As Chairman of the Jamaica Labour Party (JLP), Golding occupied a central administrative role during the 1990 internal "Spy Scandal" and subsequent "Gang of Five" rebellion, an era that severely tested his standing as the recognized heir apparent to Party Leader Edward Seaga.

The crisis began during a special meeting of the JLP Central Executive on 8 April 1990, when attorney Abe Dabdoub presented an intercepted letter detailing an internal espionage ring targeting party dissidents. Upon reading the letter—which exposed wiretapping and surveillance of senior colleagues by party-backed operatives—Golding famously walked out of the executive session in tears. Grange later noted that Golding had initially assisted in evaluating the surveillance transcripts behind closed doors before the operation was deemed unreliable and discarded.

Despite his initial distress over the privacy breaches, Golding ultimately aligned with the central leadership to enforce party discipline and suppress the spreading "Gang of Five" rebellion led by Karl Samuda and Pearnel Charles. At the JLP's 47th Annual Conference in June 1990, Golding attempted public damage control, declaring to delegates that "there was no leadership struggle in the JLP" and urging the membership to move past the media-amplified conflict.

By September 1990, Golding acted as the primary enforcer of Seaga's punitive measures against the faction. Following the summary stripping of Karl Samuda's shadow cabinet portfolio, Golding personally hand-delivered a mandatory loyalty oath to all JLP MPs and Senators, forcing them to sign and reaffirm their absolute commitment to the principle of collective responsibility by a strict deadline—a directive that triggered severe internal resentment. On October 21, 1990, Golding issued a public radio broadcast delivering a final ultimatum to the "Gang of Five," ordering them to dismantle their internal clique and publicly denounce Dabdoub's espionage claims or face complete political isolation and expulsion. Acting in his capacity as Chairman of the Standing Committee, Golding signed the formal correspondence notifying Pearnel Charles that he would no longer be considered as an approved JLP candidate for the upcoming general elections.

Though Golding successfully protected Seaga’s leadership through these centralized measures, the trauma and severe structural friction of the 1990 purges deeply eroded his long-term relationship with the party's establishment. The crisis directly catalyzed his eventual resignation from the JLP chairmanship and the party entirely in 1995 to co-found the National Democratic Movement (NDM).

This directive resulted in Golding being named as the principal defendant in the historic 1991 Supreme Court lawsuit Pearnel Charles v. Bruce Golding and Ryan Peralto, tasked with defending the party's decision. The litigation led to a critical Court of Appeal ruling establishing that courts possess jurisdiction to review internal party processes if constitutional rights are compromised.

== Prime minister ==
Golding, as leader of the Jamaica Labour Party, became prime minister, following his party's slim victory in the 3 September 2007 general election and Prime Minister Portia Simpson-Miller's concession of defeat two days later. The JLP defeated the People's National Party by a narrow margin of 32 seats to 28, with a turnout of 61.46%. This election ended 18 years of PNP rule, and Golding became the new prime minister.

Golding was sworn in by the Governor-General of Jamaica on 11 September 2007. Golding was the nation's eighth prime minister since independence.

In April 2011, Golding said that Jamaica should break its ties with the British monarchy and become a republic. Speaking during a budget debate, Golding said that "transforming Jamaica from a monarchical to a republican state means no disrespect, and must not be interpreted this way".

=== "Criminal affiliate" accusation ===
An ABC Network article reported that Golding was a "criminal affiliate of Christopher Coke". The article referred to a U.S government document to sustain its position. Golding categorically denied the accusation and this "U.S government document" has still not been produced.

Public and media scrutiny over Golding's proximity to West Kingston's gang infrastructure dated back to March 1992, when he featured prominently alongside other senior Jamaica Labour Party (JLP) delegates at the massive public funeral of notorious Shower Posse leader Lester Lloyd "Jim Brown" Coke. Given Coke's extensive criminal background and his death in custody while awaiting extradition to the United States on federal drug and murder charges, the high-profile attendance of Golding, Edward Seaga, and Olivia "Babsy" Grange sparked lasting national controversy regarding the relationship between political representatives and garrison cartel networks. Golding was seated in the front row reserved for political delegates at the Tivoli Gardens Community Centre during the service, which took place the same day Coke's son, Mark "Jah T" Coke, was buried.

=== Manatt, Phelps & Phillips and Christopher "Dudus" Coke extradition request ===
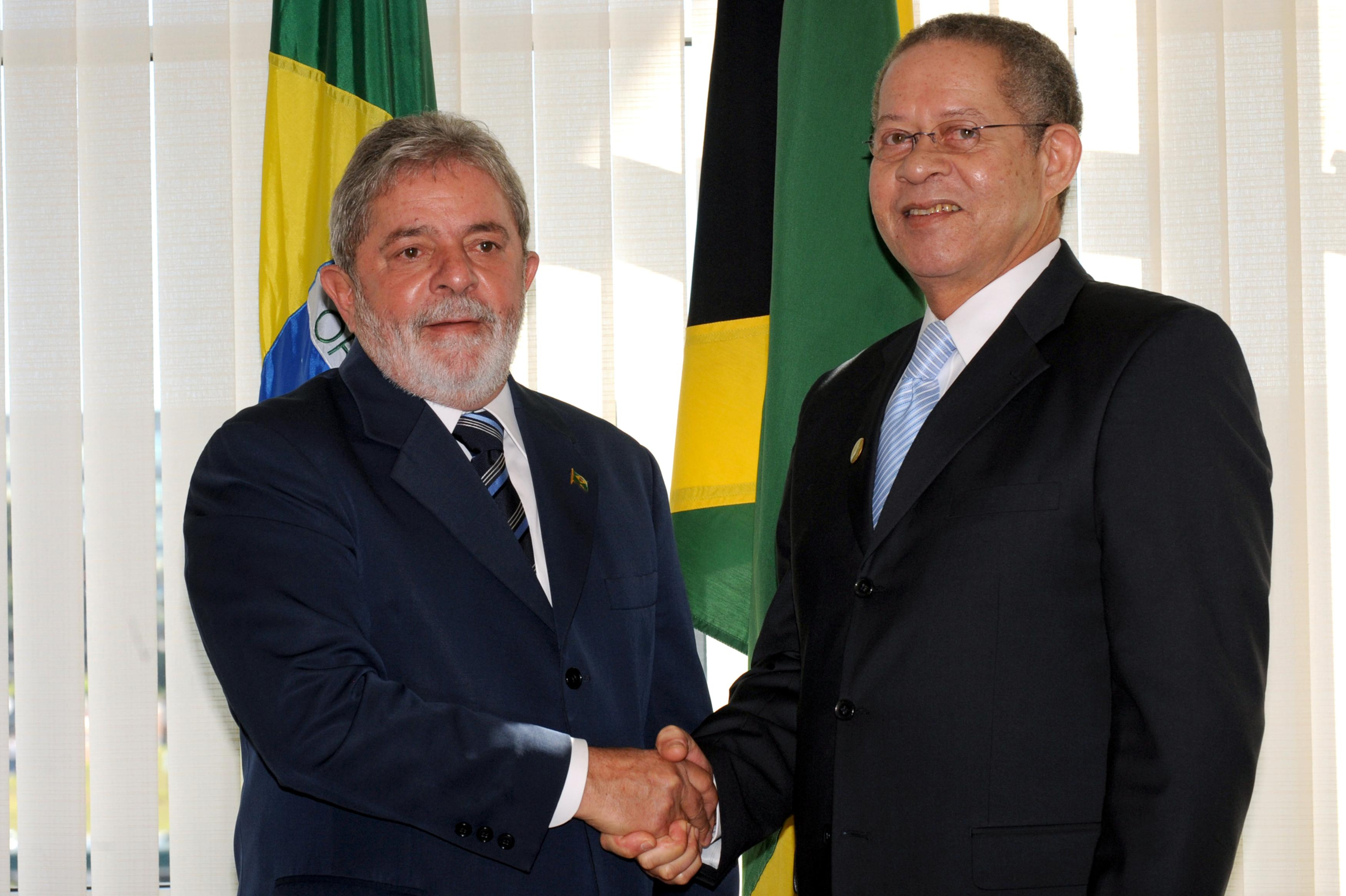
Golding with the President of Brazil, Lula da Silva.

In a sitting of Parliament on 16 March 2010, Opposition member Dr. Peter Phillips made reference to an alleged contractual arrangement between the Government and a United States law firm Manatt, Phelps & Phillips to lobby the US Government on a treaty dispute between the two countries that had arisen as a result of the Jamaican Government refusing to sign an extradition request for Christopher 'Dudus' Coke, who is wanted in the US on charges relating to narcotics, arms and ammunition trafficking. The Golding Administration refused to sign the extradition request on the basis that the evidence was obtained contrary to Jamaican laws. Golding denied claims that Manatt, Phelps & Phillips was contracted to represent the Jamaican Government.

A US Justice Department filing under the Foreign Agents Registration Act (FARA) showed that Manatt, Phelps & Phillips had secured a contract worth US $400,000 to represent the Jamaican government in the treaty dispute. Karl Samuda, Minister of Industry, Investment and Commerce, made a statement in which he noted that unnamed members of the Jamaica Labour Party had approached Harold Brady, to see whether—through his wide network of international contacts—he could assist in facilitating the opening of discussions between the US authorities and the Government of Jamaica, and thereby seek to resolve what had become a treaty dispute between the US and Jamaica. In a statement made by Golding on 11 May 2010 in Parliament, he revealed that he had sanctioned the initiative to lobby the US Government but that the initiative was to be undertaken by the Jamaica Labour Party and not on behalf of the government.

Following his revelation, the Opposition People's National Party; its youth arm, the PNPYO; and the National Democratic Movement called for his resignation as Prime Minister. Manatt, Phelps & Phillips maintains that they were contracted on behalf of the Jamaican Government through Harold C.W. Brady of Brady and Co and have since severed ties with the Jamaican Government.

On 17 May 2010, in a televised address to the nation, Golding apologised to the Jamaican people for his involvement in the Manatt affair. He stated that he was prepared to step aside as prime minister and leader of the Party in a meeting of the party executive. The executive rejected his offer and reassured their support for his role as party leader and prime minister. In his statement, he outlined new measures including assigning some of his portfolio responsibilities to other government Ministers, and a renewed thrust to enact legislation for: the impeachment of parliamentary members, term limits for the office of prime minister and political party finance reform. He also confirmed that Attorney General and Minister of Justice Dorothy Lightbourne will sign the authorisation for the US authorities to commence the extradition case against Christopher Coke.

=== State of emergency ===
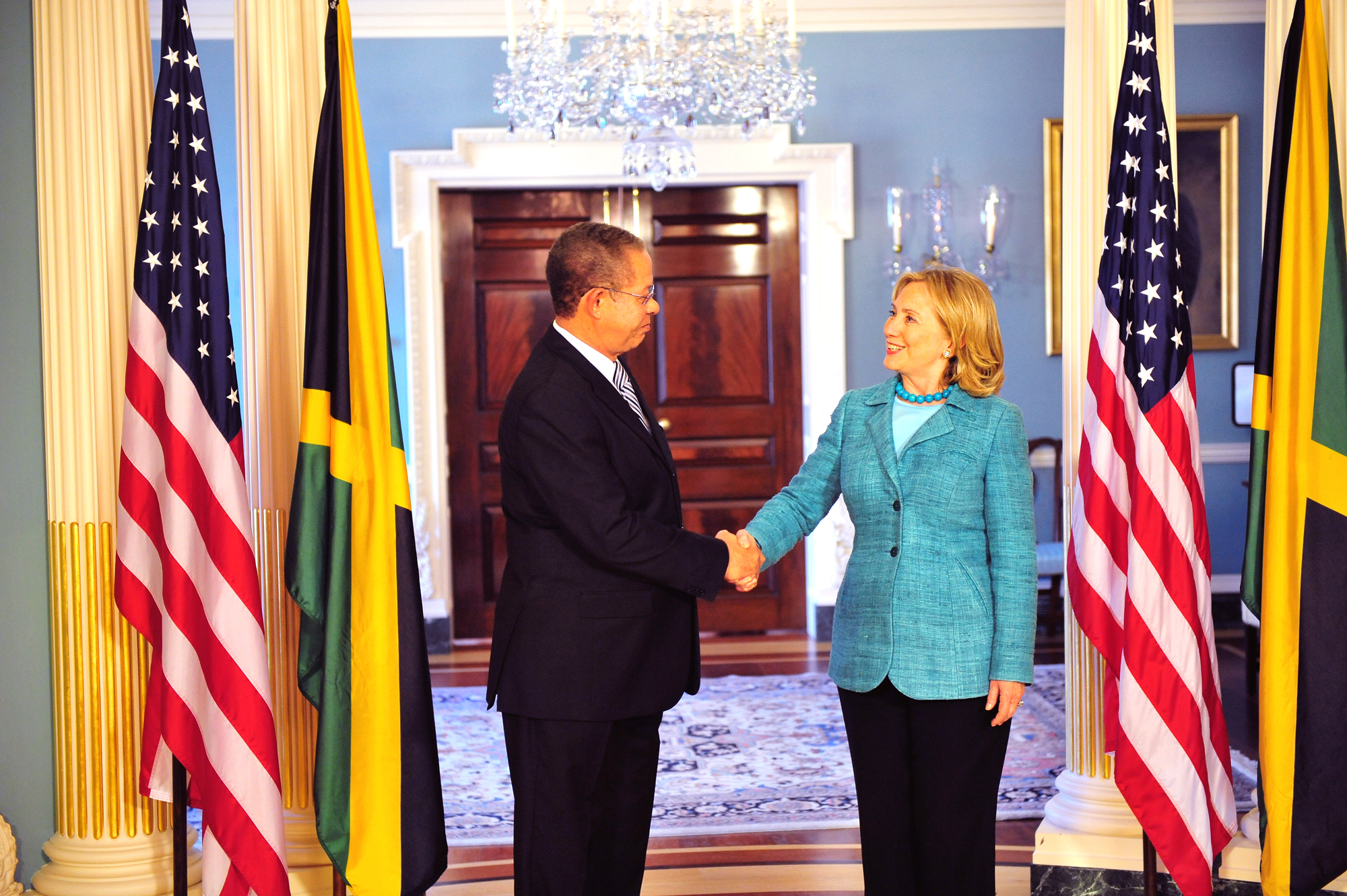
Golding with the U.S. Secretary of State, Hillary Clinton.

Following the televised address, supporters of Christopher Coke began erecting barricades to the entrances of the Tivoli Gardens Community. This continued for several days as the security forces prepared to enter Tivoli Gardens to serve Coke with the warrant for his arrest. On 23 May 2010 police stations in and around downtown Kingston came under gunfire, and two were set ablaze and later burnt to the ground allegedly by supporters of Coke. Following the attack on the police forces, Golding initiated a state of public emergency on 23 May 2010, limited to the parishes of Kingston and St Andrew, giving the security forces extraordinary powers to maintain law and order. The Jamaica Constabulary Force and the Jamaica Defence Force mounted a joint operation to enter the community, with the objectives being to arrest Coke, clear the blockades, restore law and order and recover illegal guns believed to be in the community. The security forces met with armed resistance from thugs later discovered to be hired guns of Coke. The siege lasted for several days and left 73 civilians and 3 members of the security forces (2 JCF and 1 JDF) dead, 36 weapons and 9,241 rounds of ammunition recovered.

=== Vote of no confidence ===
Following the revelation that he had sanctioned the initiative for the Jamaica Labour Party to hire US lobbying firm Manatt, Phelps & Phillips and his handling of the extradition request for Christopher "Dudus" Coke, members and groups of civil society, church groups and political parties called for his resignation. With the backing of his party, the Prime Minister maintained that he would continue his term as prime minister. This prompted the opposition People's National Party to table a motion of no confidence. The opposition leader, Portia Simpson-Miller, led the debate in Parliament outlining the arguments for Golding's removal from office and moving that he be censured. The debate lasted for four hours, and at the end the motion was defeated 30–28, with members of the House of Representatives voting strictly on party lines.

=== Resignation ===
On 25 September 2011, Golding advised the JLP's Central Executive—the second highest decision-making body for the party outside the All-Island General Conference—of his intention not to seek re-election as Leader of the Jamaica Labour Party at the party's conference in November 2011 and, upon the election of a new party leader, his intention to step down as prime minister.

The Central Executive voted unanimously at its quarterly meeting at the party's Belmont Road headquarters on 25 September 2011, to reject Golding's resignation; however, words from the Information Minister Daryl Vaz, a close confidant of Golding, were that Golding's decision would remain, despite the rejection by the Central Executive.

Golding, in a brief written statement, said:

"The challenges of the last four years have taken their toll and it was appropriate now to make way for new leadership to continue the programmes of economic recovery and transformation, while mobilising the party for victory in the next general election."

=== LGBT ===
In May 2008, in an interview with Stephen Sackur of the BBC, he declared that any cabinet formed by him would exclude any MP known to be gay. In previous statements, Golding stated that he and his party strongly opposed public displays of homosexuality in Jamaica and that he felt that they should continue to be illegal in keeping with Jamaican societal norms. He justified the illegality of homosexual acts by referring to Christian values and the integrity of the family.

== Personal life ==
Golding married Lorna Charles in 1975. They have three children: Sherene, Steven, and Ann-Merita. Golding practises Anglicanism.

== See also ==
- Cabinet of Jamaica

Political offices
Preceded by Portia Simpson-Miller	Prime Minister of Jamaica; 2007–2011	Succeeded by Andrew Holness
