= 1972 Jamaican general election =

1972 Jamaica general election
← 1967	29 February 1972	1976 →
- All 53 seats in the House of Representatives; 27 seats needed for a majority
- Turnout: 78.88% (▼3.36 pp)
Party	Leader	Vote %	Seats	+/–
PNP	Michael Manley	56.36	37	+17
JLP	Hugh Shearer	43.40	16	−17
This lists parties that won seats. See the complete results below.
Prime Minister before	Prime Minister after
Hugh Shearer; JLP	Michael Manley; PNP

General elections were held in Jamaica on 29 February 1972. The result was a victory for the People's National Party, which won 37 of the 53 seats. Voter turnout was 79%.

== Results ==
Party	Votes	%	Seats	+/–
People's National Party	266,927	56.36	37	+17
Jamaica Labour Party	205,587	43.40	16	–17
Christian Democratic Party	109	0.02	0	New
Independents	1,028	0.22	0	0
Total	473,651	100.00	53	0
Valid votes	473,651	99.14		
Invalid/blank votes	4,120	0.86		
Total votes	477,771	100.00		
Registered voters/turnout	605,662	78.88		
Source: Nohlen
