= 2007 Jamaican general election =

- 3 September 2007

All 60 seats in the House of Representatives 31 seats needed for a majority
- Turnout: 61.46% (▲2.40pp)
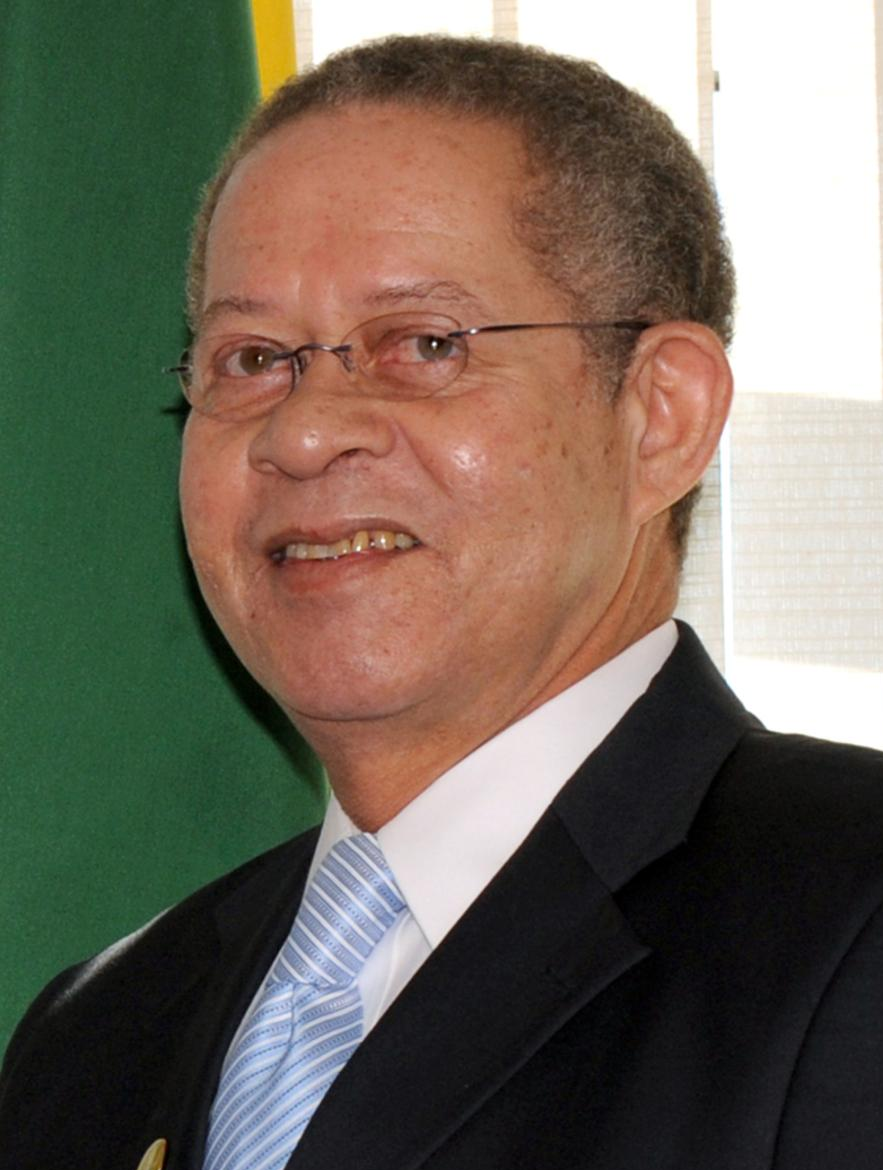

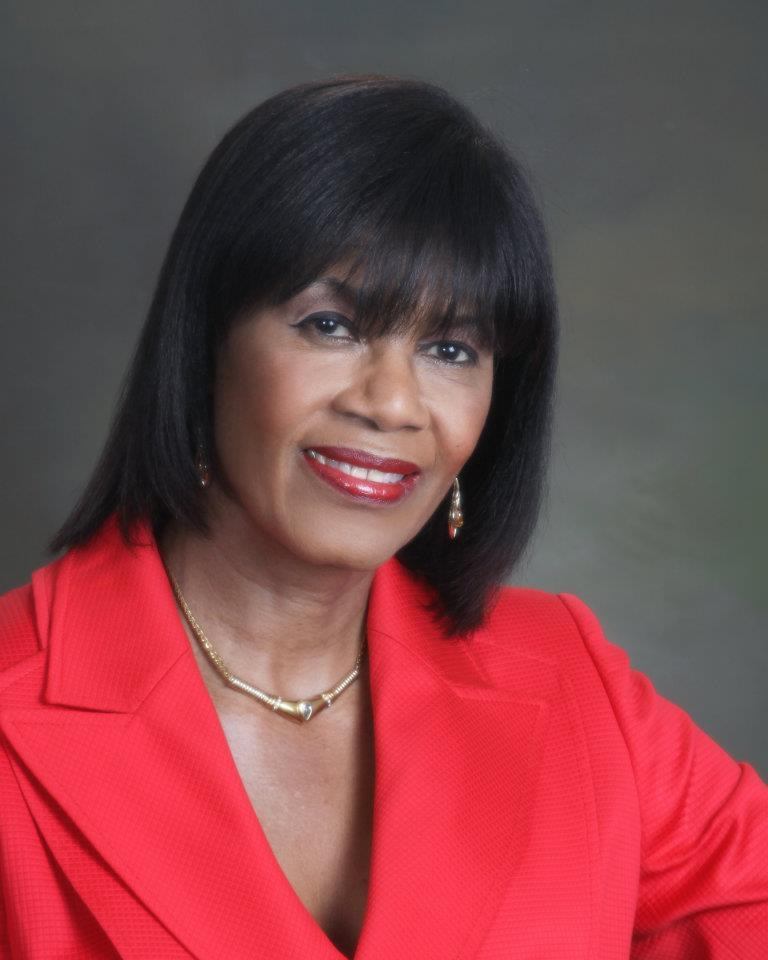
	First party	Second party
Leader	Bruce Golding	Portia Simpson-Miller
Party	JLP	PNP
Last election	47.38%, 26 seats	52.09%, 34 seats
Seats won	32	28
Seat change	▲6	▼6
Popular vote	410,438	405,293
Percentage	50.27%	49.64%
Swing	▲2.89pp	▼2.45pp
Prime Minister before election
Portia Simpson-Miller
PNP
Prime Minister after election
Bruce Golding
JLP

General elections were held in Jamaica on 3 September 2007. They had originally been scheduled for 27 August 2007 but were delayed due to Hurricane Dean. The preliminary results indicated a slim victory for the opposition Jamaican Labour Party (JLP) led by Bruce Golding, which grew by two seats from 31–29 to 33-27 after official recounts. The JLP defeated the People's National Party after eighteen years of unbroken governance.

== Results ==
Party	Votes	%	Seats	+/–
Jamaica Labour Party	410,438	50.27	32	+6
People's National Party	405,293	49.64	28	–6
National Democratic Movement	354	0.04	0	0
Imperial Ethiopian World Federation Incorporated Political Party	192	0.02	0	0
Jerusalem Bread Foundation	9	0.00	0	New
Independents	220	0.03	0	0
Total	816,506	100.00	60	0
Valid votes	816,506	99.41		
Invalid/blank votes	4,819	0.59		
Total votes	821,325	100.00		
Registered voters/turnout	1,336,307	61.46		
Source: Electoral Commission of Jamaica
