= Jamaica Labour Party =

- Leader: Andrew Holness
- Chairperson: Robert Montague
- General Secretary: Horace Chang
- Founder: Alexander Bustamante
- Founded: 8 July 1943
- Split from: People's National Party
- Headquarters: 20 Belmont Road, Kingston 5
- Youth wing: Young Jamaica; Generation 2000
- Women's Group: Women's Freedom Movement (WFM)
- Trade Union Wing: Bustamante Industrial Trade Union
- Ideology: Nationalism; Conservatism; Economic liberalism; Republicanism; Historically: Fabianism; Paternalistic conservatism
- Political position: Centre-right; Historically: Centre
- Regional affiliation: Caribbean Democrat Union; West Indies Democratic Labour Party (1957–1961)
- Colors: Green
- Anthem: "The JLP Anthem"
- House of Representatives: 35 / 63
- Senate: 13 / 21
- Local Government: 113 / 228
- Municipal Councils: 7 / 14

Election symbol

Website
- jamaicalabourparty.com

The Jamaica Labour Party is a political party in Jamaica. While its name might suggest that it is a social democratic party (as is the case for "Labour" parties in several other Commonwealth realms such as Australia, New Zealand and the United Kingdom), the JLP is actually a conservative party. Historically it embraced Fabianism.

It is the current governing party, having won 35 of the 63 parliamentary seats in the lower house of parliament (House of Representatives) in the 2025 general elections.

The JLP uses a bell, the victory sign, and the colour green as electoral symbols. The JLP is a member of the Caribbean Democrat Union.

== The JLP in colonial Jamaica ==
The party was founded on 8 July 1943 by Alexander Bustamante as the political wing of the Bustamante Industrial Trade Union. Bustamante had previously been a member of the PNP.

It won the 1944 general elections with 22 of the 32 seats. It went on to win the 1949 elections with a reduced majority. The PNP received more votes (203,048) than the JLP (199,538), but the JLP secured more seats, 17 to the PNP's 13. Two seats were won by independents. The voter turnout was 65.2%.

The JLP lost power to the PNP in the 1955 elections. The PNP won for the first time, securing 18 out of 32 seats. The JLP ended up with 14 seats, and there were no independents. The voter turnout was 65.1%. As a result, Norman Manley became the new chief minister.

The JLP remained in opposition following the 1959 Jamaican general election, when the number of seats was increased to 45. The PNP secured a wider margin of victory, taking 29 seats to the JLP's 16.

Manley was appointed Jamaica's first premier on 14 August 1959.

In the 1961 Federation membership referendum Jamaica voted 54% to leave the West Indies Federation. After losing the referendum, Manley took Jamaica to the polls in April 1962, to secure a mandate for the island's independence. On 10 April 1962, of the 45 seats up for contention in the 1962 Jamaican general election, the JLP won 26 seats and the PNP 19. The voter turnout was 72.9%.

This resulted in the independence of Jamaica on 6 August 1962, and several other British colonies in the West Indies followed suit in the next decade. Bustamante had replaced Manley as premier between April and August, and on independence, he became Jamaica's first prime minister.

== The JLP in independent Jamaica ==
Bustamante suffered a stroke in 1964 and largely withdrew from politics. However, he did not relinquish the title of party leader for another decade. Donald Sangster took over as acting prime minister after Bustamante's stroke. He was named First Deputy Leader in 1967, and led the party to victory in the 21 February 1967 Jamaican general election. The JLP won 33 out of 53 seats, with the PNP taking 20 seats.

Sangster suffered a brain hemorrhage and died about six weeks after the elections, while he was preparing for his budget presentation.

Hugh Shearer succeeded Sangster as first deputy leader and prime minister, defeating David Clement (DC) Tavares by two votes in a run-off by of the JLP parliamentarians. Tavares had come out on top in the first ballot, with Shearer and Robert Lightbourne being the other candidates. Under Shearer, the JLP lost power in independent Jamaica for the first time to the People's National Party and Michael Manley in 1972. The PNP won 37 seats to the JLP's 16.

Shearer served as opposition leader until 1974. Bustamante finally gave up the post of party leader in 1974, and Edward Seaga was elected his successor. The party lost the 1976 elections, the PNP winning 47 seats to the JLP's 13. The turnout was a very high 85 percent.

Seaga became prime minister after victory in 1980 when the party won by a landslide, capturing 51 of the then 60 parliamentary seats.

In 1983 with the JLP achieving a spike in popularity, in part because of Seaga's support of the US-led military invasion of Grenada, Seaga called early elections and won all sixty seats, the majority by acclamation, mainly because the opposition PNP boycotted those elections. The JLP suffered defeat in the 1989 elections. The PNP won 45 seats to the JLP's 15.

The JLP went on to lose elections in 1993, 1997 and 2002, all under the continued leadership of Seaga. In 1993, the PNP, led by P.J. Patterson, won 52 seats to the JLP's eight seats, while in 1997 the PNP won 50 of the 60 seats available. In the 2002 Jamaican general election, the PNP retained power with a reduced seat majority of 34 seats to 26. Patterson stepped down on 26 February 2006, and was replaced by Portia Simpson-Miller, Jamaica's first female prime minister.

In 2005 Bruce Golding succeeded Seaga as leader of the party, and led it to victory in the 2007 elections by a narrow margin of 32 seats to 28, with a turnout of 61.46%. This election ended 18 years of PNP rule, and Bruce Golding became the new prime minister.

Golding resigned as head of the party and prime minister in October 2011 and was succeeded by Andrew Holness. Soon after becoming leader, Holness called an election over a year before it was constitutionally due, and the party lost by a 2:1 margin to the PNP. Portia Simpson-Miller and the PNP returned to power. The number of seats had been increased to 63, and the PNP swept to power with a landslide 42 seats to the JLP's 21. The voter turnout was 53.17%.

Holness continued to lead the party as opposition leader. The party held a leadership election on 10 November 2013 where Holness was challenged by his deputy, Shadow Minister for Finance Audley Shaw. Holness defeated Shaw by a margin of 2,704 votes to Shaw's 2,012.

Holness went on to lead the JLP to a narrow, one-seat parliamentary majority (32–31) in the 2016 general election, reducing the PNP to the opposition benches after one term. The voter turnout dipped below 50% for the first time, registering just 48.37%.

In the 2020 general election, Andrew Holness made history for the JLP by accomplishing a second consecutive win for the Jamaica Labour Party, winning 49 seats to 14 won by the PNP, led this time by Peter Phillips. The last time a consecutive win occurred for the JLP was in 1980. However, the turnout at this election was just 37%, probably affected by the coronavirus pandemic. This is what Jamaicans classified as a "landslide victory".

== Political positions ==
The JLP is a conservative party. It believes in a market-driven economy and individual personal responsibility.

In its coverage of the 1967 general election, The Guardian identified the JLP as a left-of-centre party, only slightly to the right of the PNP.

In May 2008, in an interview with Stephen Sackur of the BBC, Bruce Golding PM and Party Leader declared that any cabinet formed by him would exclude any MP known to be gay. In previous statements, Golding stated that he and his party strongly opposed public displays of homosexuality in Jamaica and that he felt that they should continue to be illegal in keeping with Jamaican societal norms. He underlined the illegality of homosexual acts by citing Christian values and the integrity of the family.

Since the 1990s, the JLP has stated its intention for Jamaica to be a republic and to drop the British monarchy as its head of state. Following Barbados' transition to a republic in 2021, Prime Minister and JLP leader Andrew Holness suggested that a referendum on republicanism could be held in Jamaica in 2025. "Jamaica is, as you would see, a country that is very proud of our history and very proud of what we have achieved," Holness said in June 2022. "And we intend to attain, in short order, our development goals and fulfill our true ambitions and destiny as an independent, developed, prosperous country."

== Election results ==
=== House of Representatives ===
| Election | Leader | Votes | % | Seats | +/– | Position | Status |
|---|---|---|---|---|---|---|---|
| 1944 | Alexander Bustamante | 144,661 | 41.4% | 22 / 32 | New | 1st | Supermajority government |
| 1949 | Alexander Bustamante | 199,538 | 42.7% | 17 / 32 | ▼5 | 1st | Majority government |
| 1955 | Alexander Bustamante | 189,929 | 39.0% | 14 / 32 | ▼3 | ▼2nd | Opposition |
| 1959 | Alexander Bustamante | 247,149 | 44.3% | 16 / 45 | ▲2 | 2nd | Opposition |
| 1962 | Alexander Bustamante | 288,130 | 50.0% | 26 / 45 | ▲10 | ▲1st | Majority government |
| 1967 | Donald Sangster | 224,180 | 50.7% | 33 / 53 | ▲7 | 1st | Majority government |
| 1972 | Hugh Shearer | 205,587 | 43.4% | 16 / 53 | ▼17 | ▼2nd | Opposition |
| 1976 | Edward Seaga | 318,180 | 43.2% | 13 / 60 | ▼3 | 2nd | Opposition |
| 1980 | Edward Seaga | 502,115 | 58.3% | 51 / 60 | ▲38 | ▲1st | Supermajority government |
| 1983 | Edward Seaga | 23,363 | 89.7% | 60 / 60 | ▲9 | 1st | Supermajority government |
| 1989 | Edward Seaga | 362,589 | 43.3% | 15 / 60 | ▼45 | ▼2nd | Opposition |
| 1993 | Edward Seaga | 263,711 | 39.4% | 8 / 60 | ▼7 | 2nd | Opposition |
| 1997 | Edward Seaga | 297,387 | 38.9% | 10 / 60 | ▲2 | 2nd | Opposition |
| 2002 | Edward Seaga | 360,468 | 47.4% | 26 / 60 | ▲16 | 2nd | Opposition |
| 2007 | Bruce Golding | 410,438 | 50.3% | 32 / 60 | ▲6 | ▲1st | Majority government |
| 2011 | Andrew Holness | 405,920 | 46.3% | 21 / 63 | ▼11 | ▼2nd | Opposition |
| 2016 | Andrew Holness | 436,972 | 50.1% | 32 / 63 | ▲11 | ▲1st | Majority government |
| 2020 | Andrew Holness | 406,085 | 57.1% | 49 / 63 | ▲17 | 1st | Supermajority government |
| 2025 | Andrew Holness | 412,705 | 50.5% | 35 / 63 | ▼14 | 1st | Majority government |

=== West Indies ===
| Election | Group | Leader | Votes | % | Seats | Position | Status |
|---|---|---|---|---|---|---|---|
| 1958 | DLP | Alexander Bustamante | 451,233 | 52.2% | 12 / 17 | 1st | Opposition |

== List of party leaders ==
- Sir Alexander Bustamante (1943–1974)
- Sir Donald Sangster (acting: 1965–1967)^{1}
- Hugh Shearer (acting: 1967–1974)^{1}
- Edward Seaga (1974–2005)
- Bruce Golding (2005–2011)
- Andrew Holness (2011–present)

== Previous logos ==
Logo of the party from the 2016 Jamaican election to October 2024.

Logo of the party from the early 2000's to 2016.

An earlier pre-1990's logo, still seen today outside the party headquarters.

== Notes ==
1. Donald Sangster and Hugh Shearer were not actually leaders of the JLP but were de facto leaders during Bustamante's illness/withdrawal from active political life.
