= 1980 Jamaican general election =

- 30 October 1980

All 60 seats in the House of Representatives 31 seats needed for a majority
- Turnout: 86.91% (▲1.70pp)
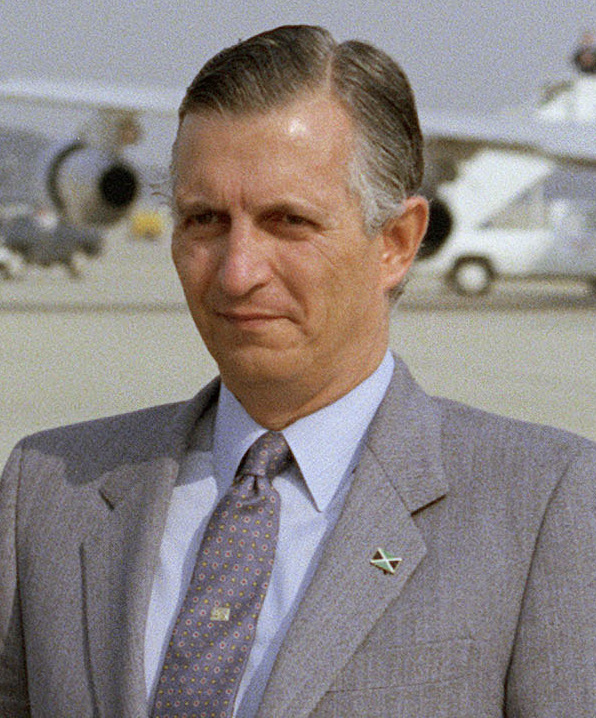

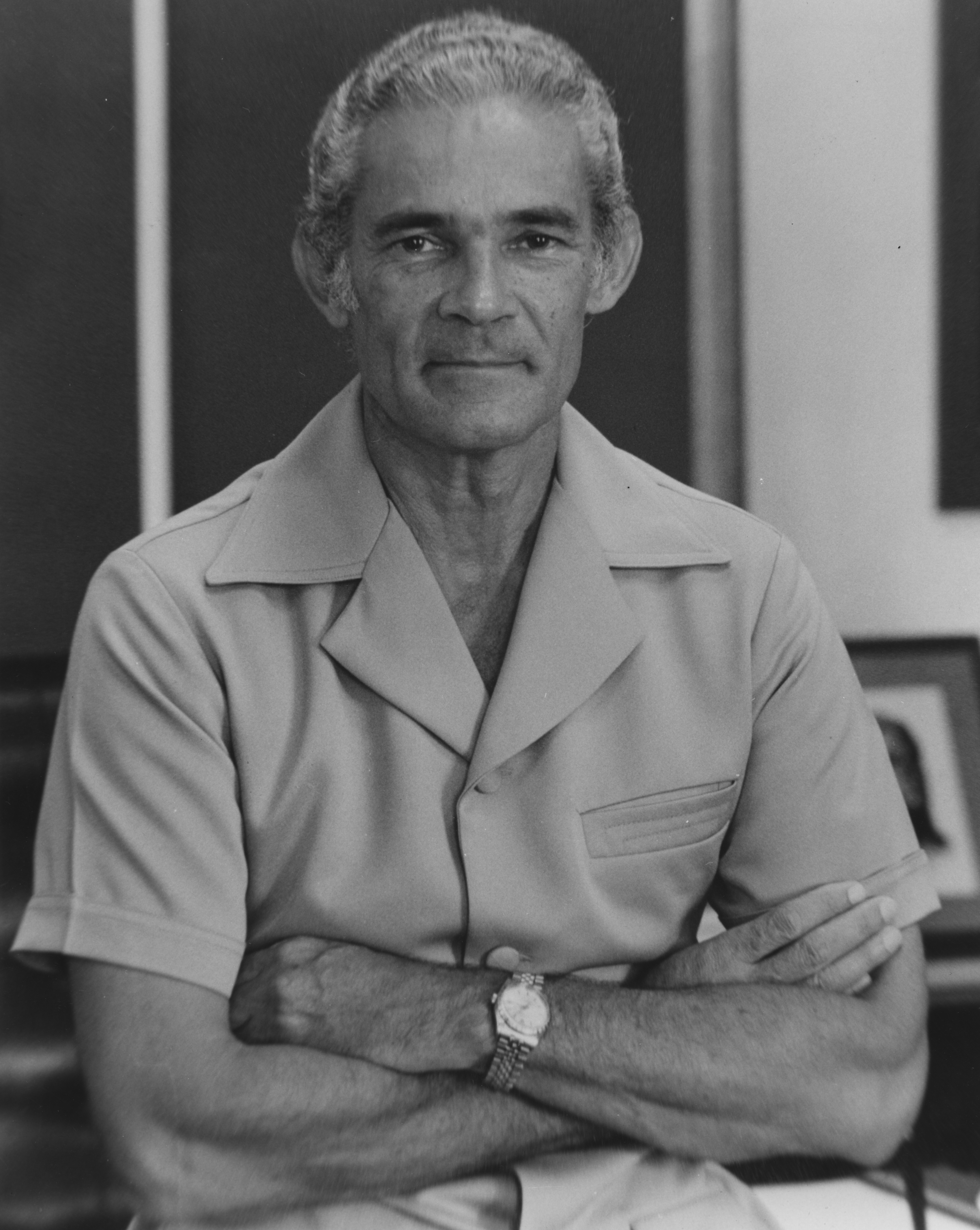
	First party	Second party
Leader	Edward Seaga	Michael Manley
Party	JLP	PNP
Leader since	23 November 1974	1969
Leader's seat	Kingston Western	Port Royal
Last election	43.23%, 13 seats	56.77%, 47 seats
Seats won	51	9
Seat change	▲38	▼38
Popular vote	502,115	417,768
Percentage	58.88%	41.05%
Swing	▲15.65	▼15.72 pp
Prime Minister before election
Michael Manley
PNP
Prime Minister after election
Edward Seaga
JLP

General elections were held in Jamaica on 30 October 1980. The balance of power in the 60-seat Jamaican House of Representatives was dramatically-shifted. Prior to the vote, the People's National Party (PNP), led by Prime Minister Michael Manley, had a 47–13 majority over the Jamaica Labour Party (JLP), led by Edward Seaga. With the loss by 38 PNP incumbents to their JLP challengers, Seaga's party captured a 51–9 majority and Seaga replaced Manley as Prime Minister of Jamaica. Voter turnout was 87%.

== Conduct ==
The elections were marked by gun violence, exacerbated by economic pressure related to IMF austerity, lay-offs of public workers, and blackouts due to a national electric strike. 153 elderly women died in the Eventide Home fire on 20 May, which was suspected, but not proven, to have been started by politically-motivated arsonists.

== Results ==
Party	Votes	%	Seats	+/–
Jamaica Labour Party	502,115	58.88	51	+38
People's National Party	350,064	41.05	9	–38
Independents	527	0.06	0	New
Total	852,706	100.00	60	0
Valid votes	852,706	99.07		
Invalid/blank votes	8,040	0.93		
Total votes	860,746	100.00		
Registered voters/turnout	990,417	86.91		
Source: Nohlen
