= People's National Party =

Jamaican centre-left political party

People's National Party Piipl's Nashinal Paati
- Abbreviation: PNP
- Leader: Mark Golding
- President: Mark Golding
- Chairperson: Angela Brown-Burke
- General Secretary: Dayton Campbell
- Founders: Norman Manley
- Founded: 1938
- Headquarters: Kingston, Jamaica
- Youth wing: People's National Party Youth Organization
- Ideology: Social democracy Republicanism; Historically: Democratic socialism Left-wing populism
- Political position: Centre-left
- Regional affiliation: COPPPAL; West Indies Federal Labour Party (1957–1962)
- International affiliation: Socialist International
- House of Representatives: 29 / 63
- Senate: 8 / 21
- Local Government: 115 / 228
- Parish Councils: 6 / 13

Election symbol

Website
- pnp.org.jm

The People's National Party (PNP; Jamaican Patois: Piipl's Nashinal Paati) is a social democratic political party in Jamaica, founded in 1938 by Norman Washington Manley who served as party president until his death in 1969. It holds 28 of the 63 seats in the House of Representatives, and 96 of the 227 local government divisions. The party is democratic socialist by constitution.

The party is a member of COPPPAL and a full member of Socialist International. From 1957–1962, the party was a member of the West Indies Federal Labour Party in the Federal Parliament of the West Indies Federation.

== Colonial Jamaica ==
The PNP was founded in 1938 by Norman Washington Manley, and is the second-oldest political party in Jamaica (the People's Political Party was formed earlier, on 9 September 1929, by Marcus Garvey). It is now one of the country's main two political parties, and is considered more to the left than its main rival the Jamaica Labour Party (JLP). The party held a majority of seats in the parliament of the Colony of Jamaica from 1955–1962. Following independence in 1962, it held the majority of seats in the Jamaican Parliament from 1972–1980, from 1989–2007, and from 2011–2016.

The PNP was defeated at the first universal election held in Jamaica in 1944, winning only four of the 32 seats (one elected independent joined the party afterwards). The 1949 Jamaican general election was much closer. The PNP received more votes (203,048) than the JLP (199,538), but the JLP secured more seats; 17 to the PNP's 13. Two seats were won by independents. The voter turnout was 65.2%.

In 1954, the PNP expelled Richard Hart, a Marxist, and three other PNP members for their (alleged) Communist views. The other three members were: Ken Hill, Frank Hill, and Arthur Henry, and they were collectively referred to as "the four Hs". Under "the four Hs", the unions they were in charge of had the largest following of any union outside of the Bustamante Industrial Trade Union.

Hart and the other members of "the four Hs" were very active in the trade union movement in Jamaica. In the 1940s and 1950s. Hart worked as a member of the executive committee of the Trade Union Council from 1946–1948. He served as Assistant Secretary of the Caribbean Labour Congress from 1945–1946 and Assistant Secretary from 1947–1953.

The expulsion of the 'Four Hs' signalled a parting of ways between the PNP and the Trade Union Congress (TUC), which was aligned to the PNP. The National Workers Union (NWU) effectively filled the vacuum left by the TUC.

The PNP came to power in 1955, and held power until just before Jamaican independence in 1962. At the 1955 Jamaican general election, the PNP won for the first time, securing 18 out of 32 seats. The JLP ended up with 14 seats, and there were no independents. The voter turnout with 65.1%. As a result, Norman Manley became the new chief minister.

The 1959 Jamaican general election was held on 28 July 1959, and the number of seats was increased to 45. The PNP secured a wider margin of victory, taking 29 seats to the JLP's 16.

Manley was appointed Jamaica's first premier on 14 August 1959.

During this period of government, it promoted actively reformist social democratic policies, including opening secondary education to many poorer Jamaicans through state funding of scholarships.

At the 1961 Federation membership referendum, Jamaica voted 54% to leave the West Indies Federation. After losing the referendum, Manley took Jamaica to the polls in April 1962, to secure a mandate for the island's independence. On 10 April 1962, of the 45 seats up for contention in the 1962 Jamaican general election, the JLP won 26 seats and the PNP 19. The voter turnout was 72.9%.

This resulted in the independence of Jamaica on 6 August 1962, and several other British colonies in the West Indies followed suit over the next decade. Bustamante had replaced Manley as premier between April and August, and upon independence, he became Jamaica's first prime minister.

== Independent Jamaica ==
On 21 February, in the 1967 Jamaican general election, the JLP were victorious again, winning 33 out of 53 seats, with the PNP taking 20 seats.

In 1972, under the leadership of Norman Manley's son Michael Manley, the PNP returned to office committed to democratic socialism and a foreign policy focused on strengthening relations with the Global South. The PNP won 37 seats to the JLP's 16. In the 1976 Jamaican general election, the PNP won another landslide, winning 47 seats to the JLP's 13. The turnout was a very high 85 percent.

In 1980, after several years characterised by inflation and rising unemployment, the JLP led by Edward Seaga overwhelmingly defeated the PNP in a campaign noteworthy for its alarming level of violence. The JLP won 51 seats to the PNP's nine seats.

Manley led the party in a boycott of the snap election called in 1983. The party was absent from parliament for more than five years. The PNP was returned to office under Manley's leadership in 1989, winning 45 seats to the JLP's 15.

Manley retired from politics in 1992, and was replaced as party leader by P. J. Patterson. Patterson led the PNP to victory in 1993, 1997, and 2002, becoming the first political leader in Jamaican history to win three successive general elections. In 1993, the PNP won 52 seats to the JLP's eight seats, and in 1997 the PNP won 50 of the 60 seats available.

In the 2002 election, held on 16 October 2002, the party won 52.2% of the popular vote and 34 of the 60 seats in the House of Representatives.

On 26 February 2006, Portia Simpson-Miller was elected as Patterson's successor, becoming the first female president of the PNP, and became the first female prime minister of Jamaica. The PNP lost the August 2007 election to the JLP by a narrow margin of 32 seats to 28, with a turnout of 61.46%. This election ended 18 years of PNP rule, and Bruce Golding became the new prime minister.

In the 29 December 2011 general election, the PNP was returned to power with 42 of the 63 seats in Jamaica's parliament. At first, 41 seats were counted in favour of the PNP. A recount with official results cost the former agriculture minister, Christopher Tufton, his seat, putting the PNP at 42 and the JLP at 21. The number of seats had been increased to 63, and the voter turnout was 53.17%.

On 5 January 2012, Portia Simpson-Miller was sworn in as prime minister for the second time in her political career. On the following day, she assigned 20 cabinet ministers to various ministries, and eight state ministers.

In the 2016 Jamaican general election on 25 February, Simpson-Miller lost to Andrew Holness by a narrow margin. A recount granted the PNP an additional seat, resulting in a one-seat loss. The PNP won 31 seats to the JLP's 32. As a result, Simpson-Miller became Opposition Leader for a second time. The voter turnout dipped below 50% for the first time, registering just 48.37%.

Following calls from within her own party for her to step down as party leader, Simpson-Miller announced she would not seek re-election on 4 December 2016. She was replaced by Peter Phillips, the Shadow Minister of Finance and former rival, on 26 March 2017. She stepped down as an MP in June 2017.

In the September 2020 general elections, the PNP returned to the opposition benches winning a paltry 14 of the 63 seats in the Jamaican parliament in what was described as a political carnage toppling the hierarchy of the PNP. Many senior and well-established party members lost their seats, including Peter Bunting, Dayton Campbell, Fenton Ferguson, Horace Dalley, Ian Hayles, Luther Buchanan, Wykeham McNeill, Dwayne Vaz and Richard Azan. On 4 September 2020 Peter Phillips announced that he would step down as Opposition Leader and retire from representational politics. The turnout at this election was just 37%, probably affected by the coronavirus pandemic.

On 7 November 2020 the PNP elected Mark Golding as its 6th president after he defeated challenger Lisa Hanna in the 2020 People's National Party leadership election by 1,740 votes to 1,444.

== Political positions ==
The party adheres to social democracy and republicanism, and is a full member of the Socialist International.

== Election results ==
=== House of Representatives ===
Election	Leader	Votes	%	Seats	+/–	Position	Status
1944	Norman Manley	82,029	23.5%	5 / 32	New	2nd	Opposition
1949	Norman Manley	203,048	43.5%	13 / 32	▲8	2nd	Opposition
1955	Norman Manley	245,750	50.5%	18 / 32	▲5	▲1st	Majority government
1959	Norman Manley	305,642	54.8%	29 / 45	▲11	1st	Majority government
1962	Norman Manley	279,771	48.6%	19 / 45	▼10	▼2nd	Opposition
1967	Norman Manley	217,207	49.1%	20 / 53	▲1	2nd	Opposition
1972	Michael Manley	266,927	56.4%	37 / 53	▲17	▲1st	Supermajority government
1976	Michael Manley	417,768	56.8%	47 / 60	▲10	1st	Supermajority government
1980	Michael Manley	350,064	41.0%	9 / 60	▼9	▼2nd	Opposition
1983	Michael Manley	Did not contest					
1989	Michael Manley	473,754	56.6%	45 / 60	▲45	▲1st	Supermajority government
1993	P. J. Patterson	401,131	60.0%	52 / 60	▲7	1st	Supermajority government
1997	P. J. Patterson	429,805	56.2%	50 / 60	▼2	1st	Supermajority government
2002	P. J. Patterson	396,590	52.1%	34 / 60	▼16	1st	Majority government
2007	Portia Simpson-Miller	405,293	49.6%	28 / 60	▼6	▼2nd	Opposition
2011	Portia Simpson-Miller	463,232	53.3%	42 / 63	▲14	▲1st	Supermajority government
2016	Portia Simpson-Miller	433,735	49.2%	31 / 63	▼11	▼2nd	Opposition
2020	Peter Phillips	304,372	42.8%	15 / 63	▼17	2nd	Opposition
2025	Mark Golding	401,398	49.2%	28 / 63	▲14	2nd	Opposition

=== West Indies ===
Election	Group	Leader	Votes	%	Seats	Position	Status
1958	WIFLP	Norman Manley	382,525	44.2%	5 / 17	2nd	Majority government

== List of party presidents ==
- Norman Manley (1938–1969) (Founder)
- Michael Manley (1969–1992)
- Percival James Patterson (1992–2006)
- Portia Simpson-Miller (2006–2017)
- Peter Phillips (2017–2020)
- Mark Golding (2020–present)

== Previous logos ==
Logo of the People's National Party from 2011–2021.

Logo of the People's National Party used prior to the 2011 election.
