= Jamaica–Kosovo relations =

Jamaican–Kosovar relations
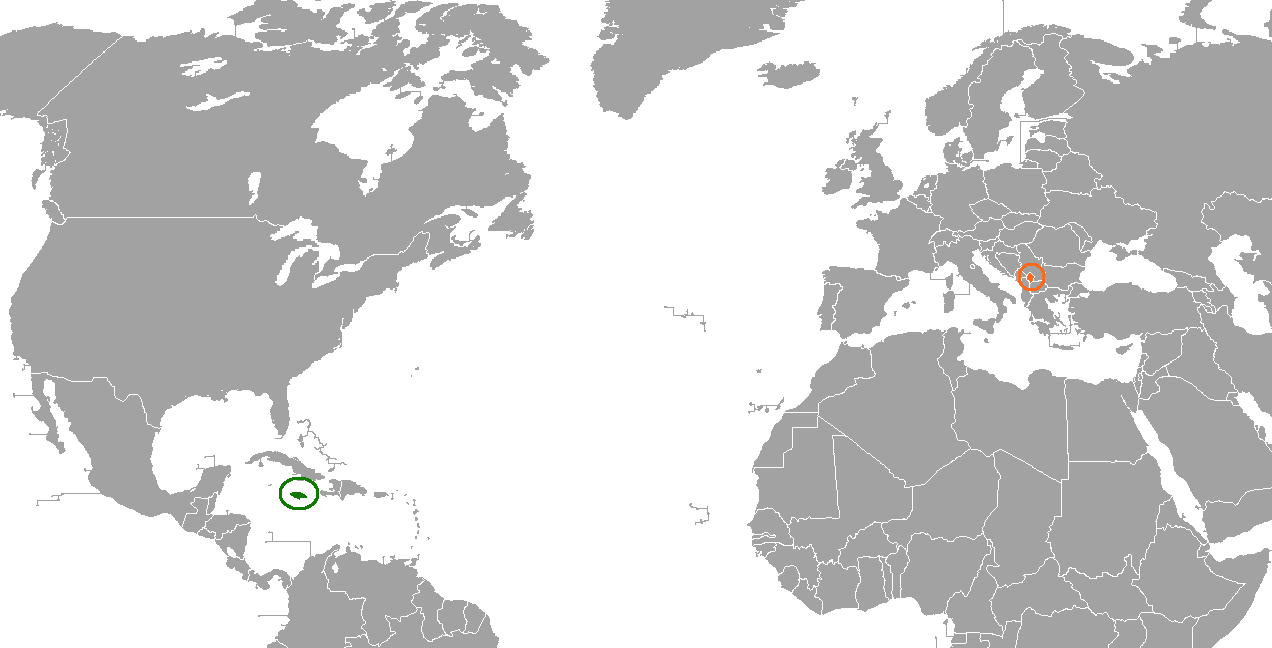

- Jamaica: Kosovo

Jamaican–Kosovar relations are foreign relations between Jamaica and Kosovo. Formal diplomatic relations between two states have not been established as Jamaica has not recognized Kosovo as a sovereign state.

== History ==
The Jamaican Government in 2009 refused a request from the United States to recognise Kosovo. On 23 July 2009, the Under Secretary for Multilateral Affairs at the Jamaican Ministry of Foreign Affairs and Foreign Trade, Ambassador Vilma McNish, indicated that she expected no change in the government of Jamaica's decision not to extend formal diplomatic recognition to Kosovo.

Following April 2010 meetings with Jamaican officials, Serbian Foreign Minister Vuk Jeremić stated that Serbia could count on Jamaica's continued support in the "preservation of its sovereignty and territorial integrity".

On 20 February 2020, the president of Kosovo Hashim Thaçi issued a statement on Twitter thanking Jamaica for recognizing Kosovo as a sovereign and independent country. However, this was denied by Jamaica's Minister of Foreign Affairs and Foreign Trade Kamina Johnson-Smith the same day.

== See also ==
- Foreign relations of Jamaica
- Foreign relations of Kosovo
