= List of diplomatic missions of Jamaica =

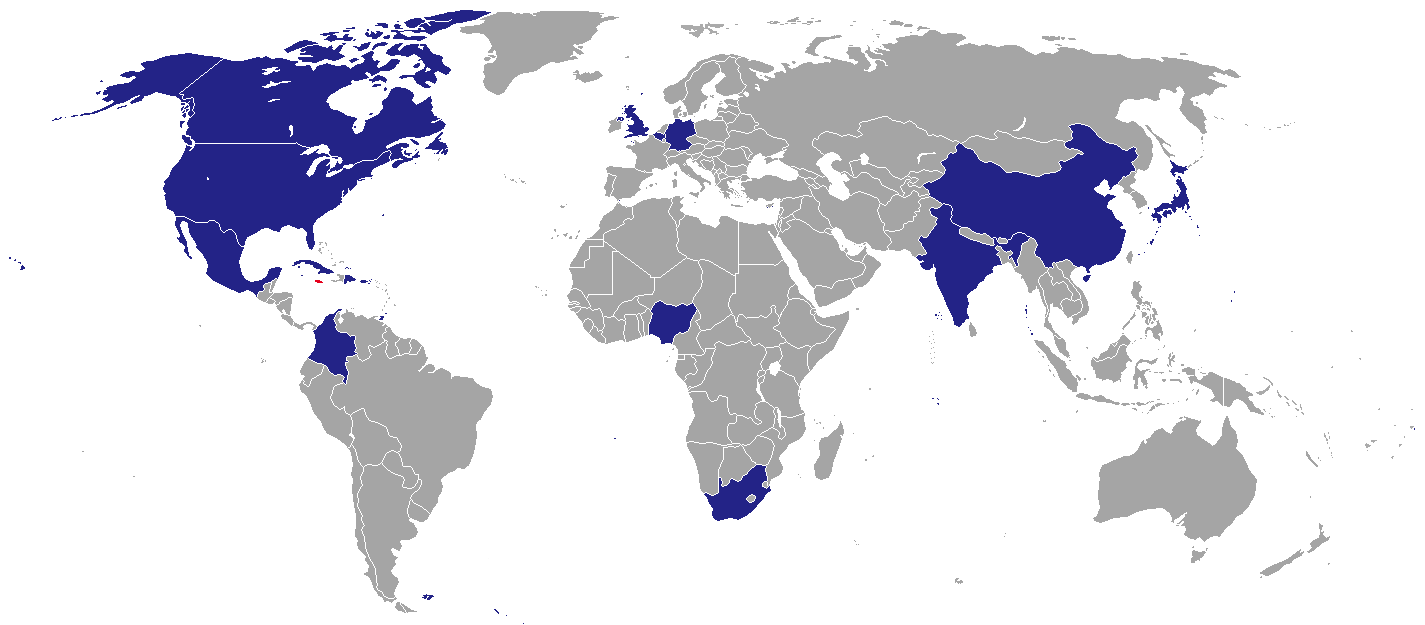
Map of Jamaican diplomatic missions

This is a list of diplomatic missions of Jamaica. Jamaica has a modest number of diplomatic missions in the world, even within its own peripheral region of the Caribbean, and they are maintained under the umbrella of the Ministry of Foreign Affairs and Foreign Trade.

Honorary consulates are excluded from this listing.

== Current missions ==
=== Africa ===
Host country	Host city	Mission	Concurrent accreditation	Ref.
Nigeria	Abuja	High Commission	Countries: Cameroon; Ghana; Morocco; Rwanda; Sierra Leone; Senegal	
South Africa	Pretoria	High Commission	Countries: Angola; Botswana; Djibouti; Eswatini; Eritrea; Ethiopia; Kenya; Lesotho; Malawi; Mauritius; Mozambique; Namibia; Seychelles; South Sudan; Sudan; Tanzania; Uganda; Zambia; Zimbabwe; Consular jurisdiction only: (Note: The following countries are listed only under the consular jurisdiction of the Jamaican High Commission in Pretoria. As of 2026, Jamaica has yet to establish formal diplomatic relations with any of them.); Comoros; Madagascar; Somalia	

=== Americas ===
Host country	Host city	Mission	Concurrent accreditation	Ref.
Canada	Ottawa	High Commission	International Organizations: International Civil Aviation Organization	
Canada	Toronto	Consulate-General	International Organizations: International Civil Aviation Organization	
Colombia	Bogotá	Embassy		
Cuba	Havana	Embassy	Countries: Haiti	
Dominican Republic	Santo Domingo	Embassy		
Mexico	Mexico City	Embassy	Countries: Belize; Costa Rica; El Salvador; Guatemala; Honduras; Nicaragua; Panama	
Trinidad and Tobago	Port of Spain	High Commission	Countries: Antigua and Barbuda; Barbados; Dominica; Grenada; Guyana; Saint Kitts and Nevis; Saint Lucia; Saint Vincent and the Grenadines; International Organizations: Association of Caribbean States	
United States	Washington, D.C.	Embassy	International Organizations: Organization of American States	
United States	Miami	Consulate-General	International Organizations: Organization of American States	
United States	New York City	Consulate-General	International Organizations: Organization of American States	

=== Asia ===
Host country	Host city	Mission	Concurrent accreditation	Ref.
China	Beijing	Embassy	Countries: Cambodia; Laos; North Korea; Pakistan; Thailand; Vietnam	
India	New Delhi	High Commission	Countries: Bangladesh; Malaysia; Nepal; Singapore; Qatar; Sri Lanka; United Arab Emirates	
Japan	Tokyo	Embassy	Countries: Australia; Indonesia; New Zealand; Philippines; South Korea	

=== Europe ===
Host country	Host city	Mission	Concurrent accreditation	Ref.
Belgium	Brussels	Embassy	Countries: France; Luxembourg; Monaco; Netherlands; Portugal; Spain; International Organizations: European Union; Organisation of African, Caribbean and Pacific States; Organisation for the Prohibition of Chemical Weapons; UNESCO	
Germany	Berlin	Embassy	Countries: Bulgaria; Croatia; Czechia; Holy See; Hungary; Israel; Poland; Romania; Russia; Slovakia; Ukraine	
United Kingdom	London	High Commission	Countries: Cyprus; Denmark; Finland; Ireland; Norway; Sweden	

=== Multilateral organizations ===
Organization	Host city	Host country	Mission	Concurrent accreditation	Ref.
United Nations	New York City	United States	Permanent Mission		
United Nations	Geneva	Switzerland	Permanent Mission	Countries: Austria; Greece; Italy; Switzerland; Turkey; International Organizations: Group of 15; International Atomic Energy Agency; International Labour Organization; United Nations Commission on International Trade Law; United Nations Conference on Trade and Development; United Nations Industrial Development Organization; United Nations Office on Drugs and Crime; World Health Organization; World Food Programme; World Trade Organization	

== Gallery ==
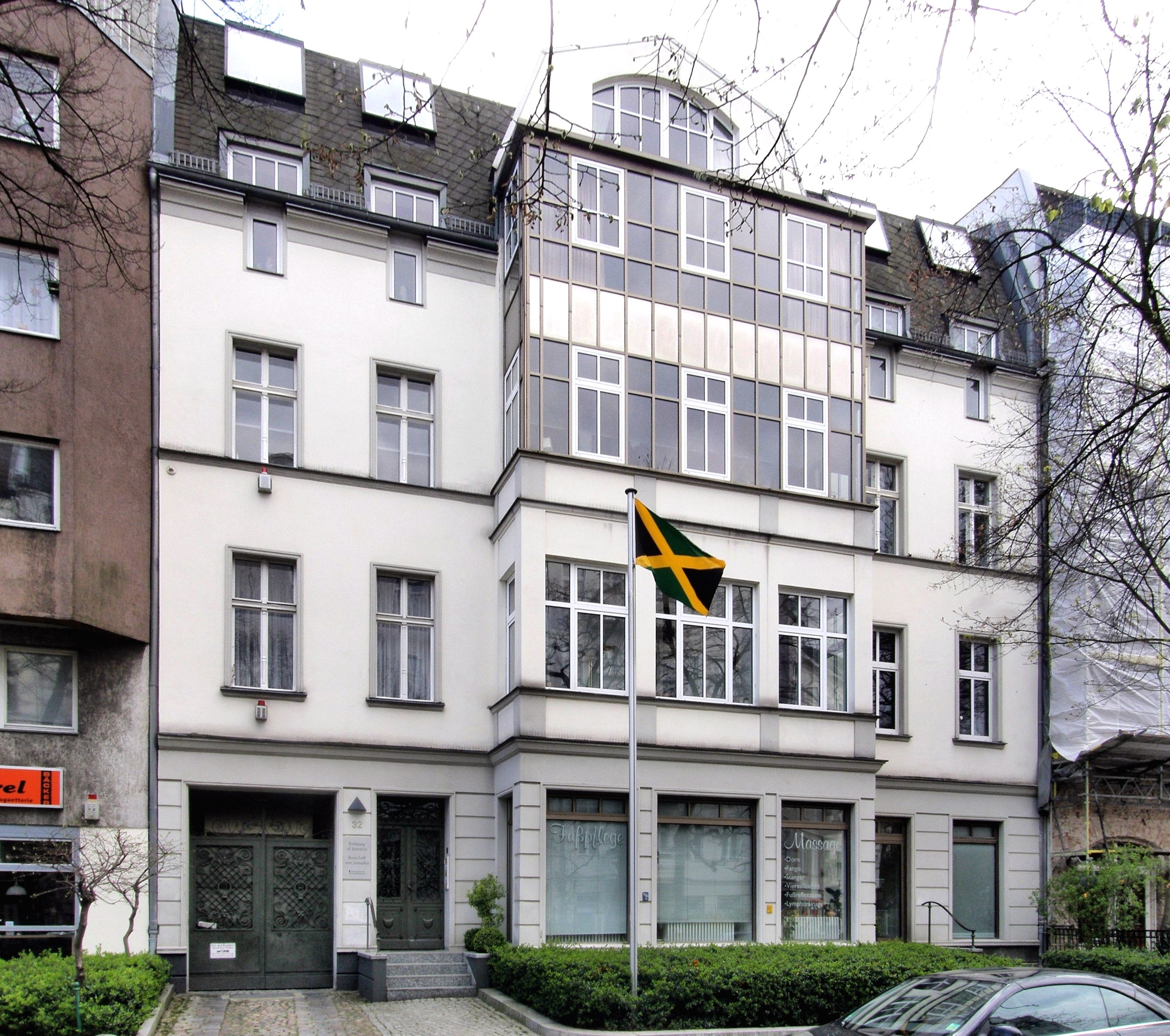
Embassy in Berlin

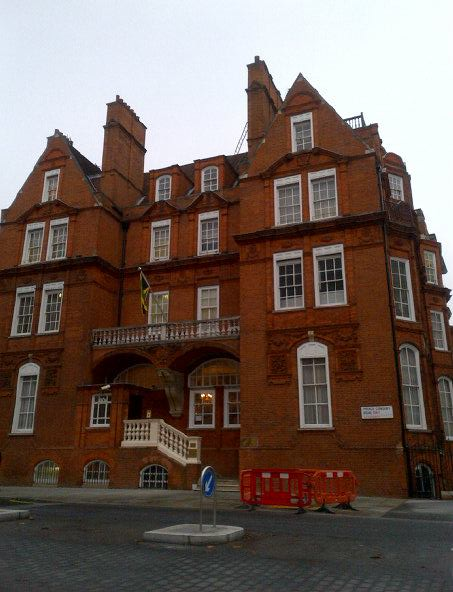
High Commission in London

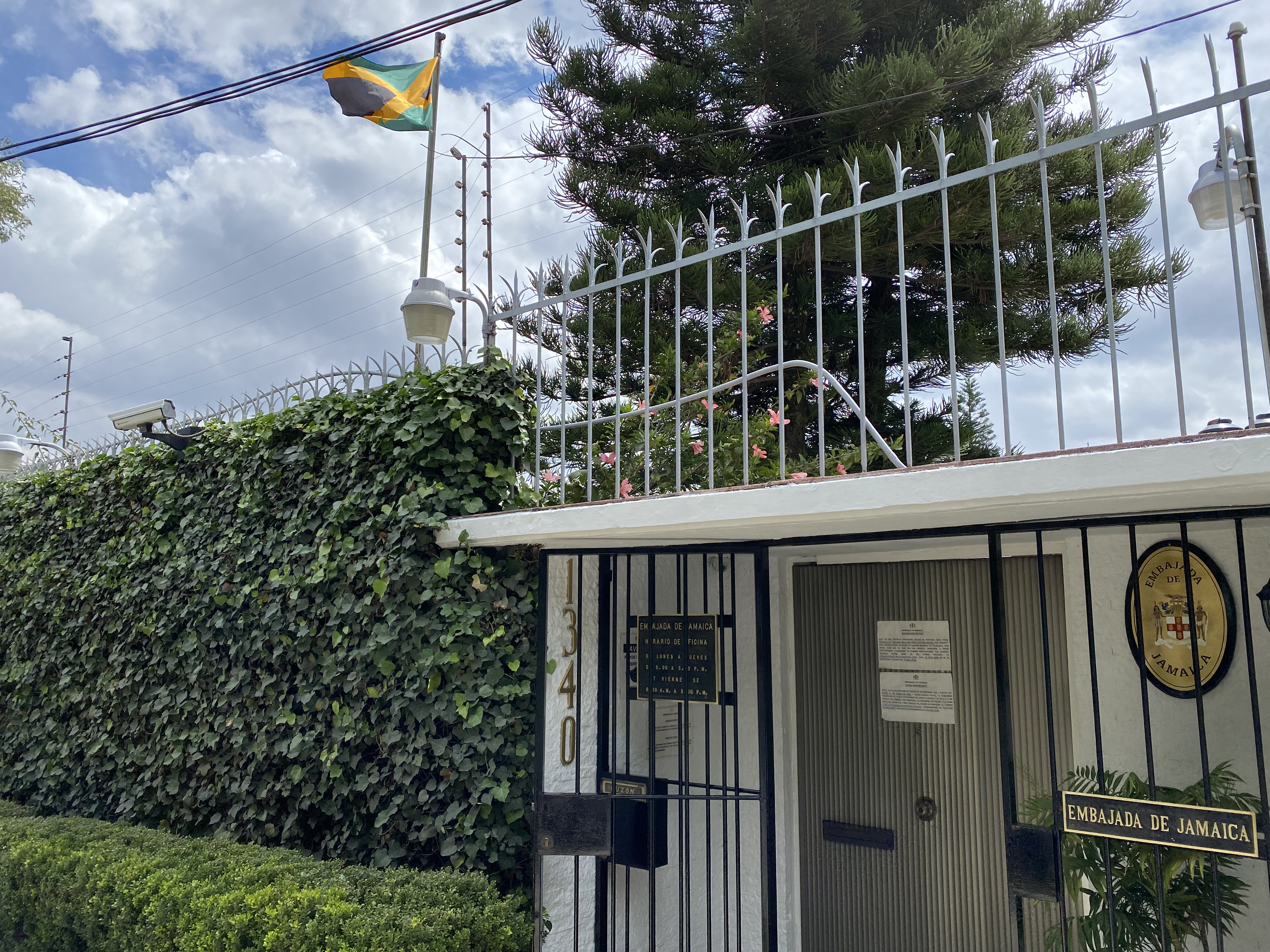
Embassy in Mexico City

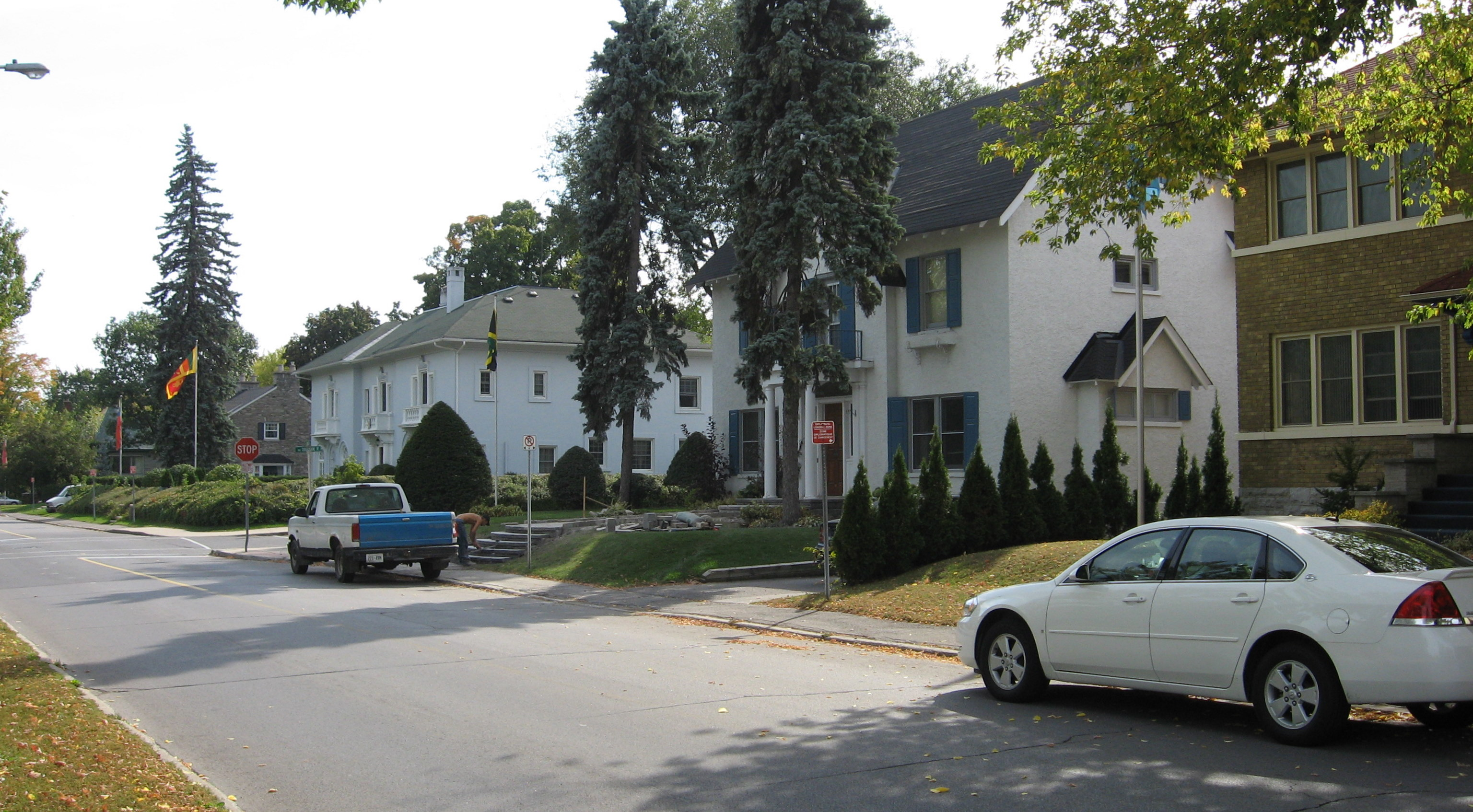
Residence of the High Commissioner in Ottawa

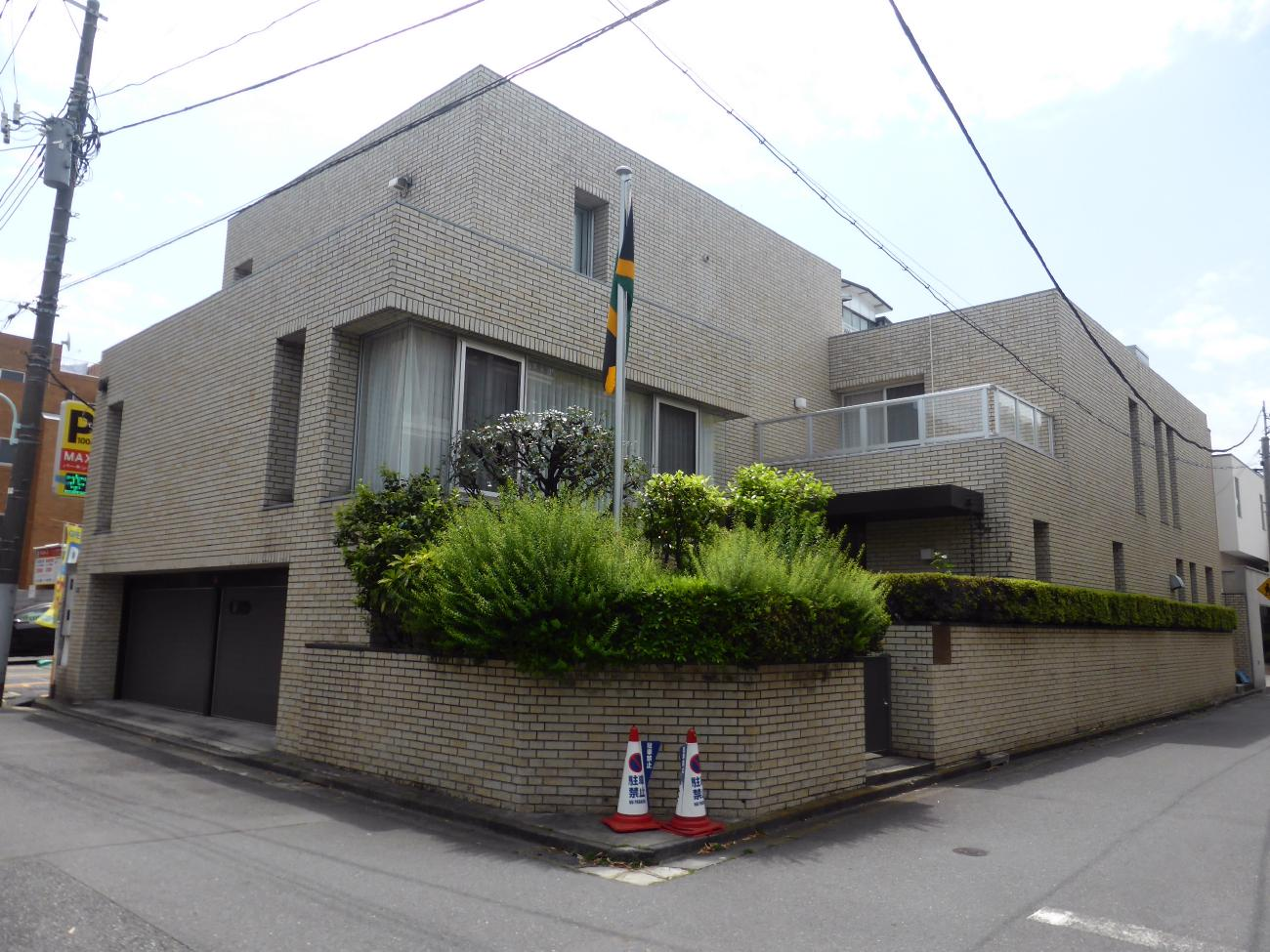
Embassy in Tokyo

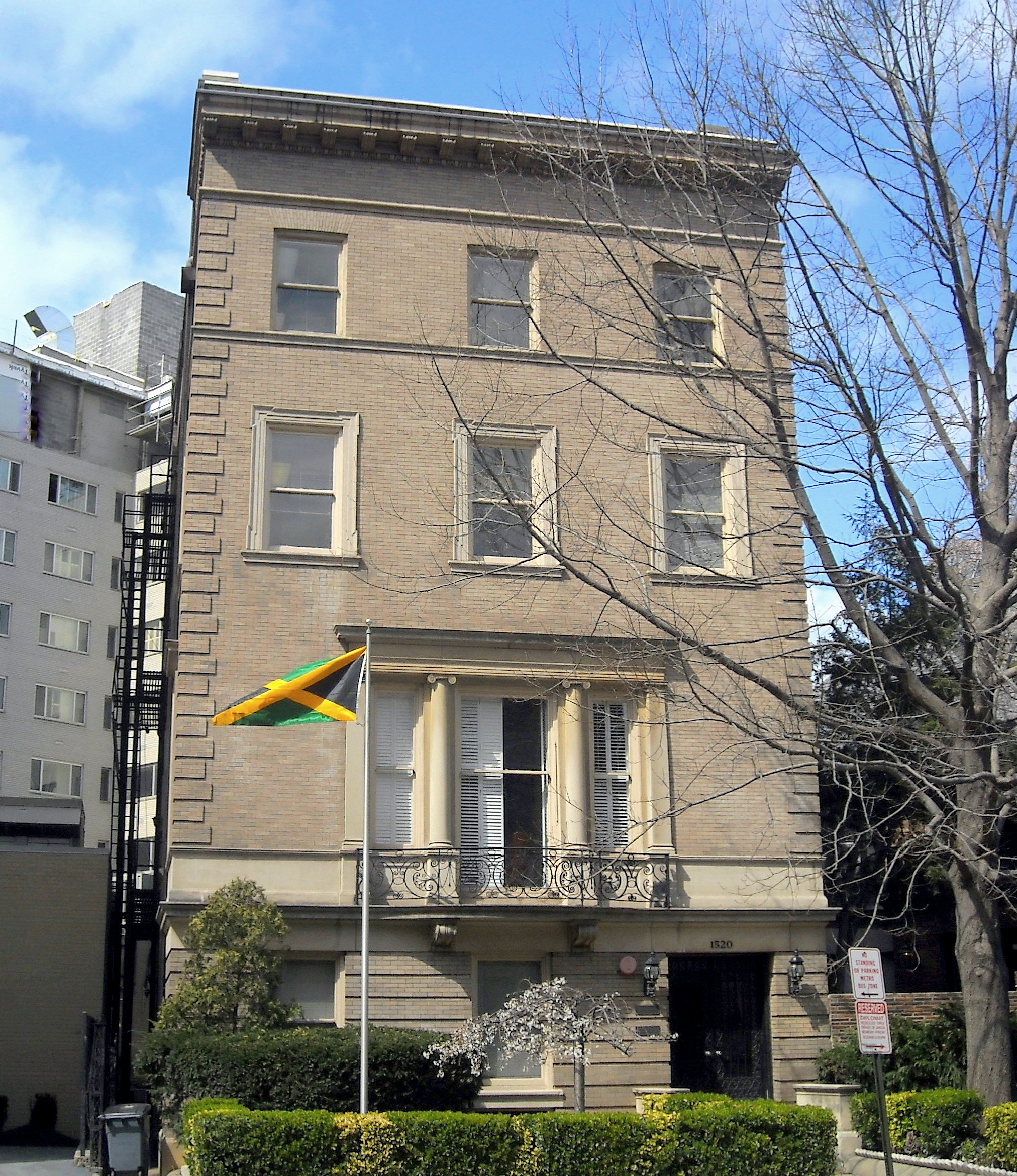
Embassy in Washington, D.C.

== Closed missions ==
=== Africa ===
Host country	Host city	Mission	Year closed	Ref.
Ethiopia	Addis Ababa	Embassy	1992	

=== Americas ===
Host country	Host city	Mission	Year closed	Ref.
Bahamas	Nassau	High Commission	Unknown	
Brazil	Brasília	Embassy	2021	
Venezuela	Caracas	Embassy	2019	

=== Asia ===
Host country	Host city	Mission	Year closed	Ref.
Kuwait	Kuwait City	Embassy	2019	

=== Europe ===
Host country	Host city	Mission	Year closed	Ref.
France	Paris	Embassy	Unknown	

== Related articles ==
- Foreign relations of Jamaica
- List of diplomatic missions in Jamaica
- Visa policy of Jamaica
- Visa requirements for Jamaican citizens
