= Ministry of Foreign Affairs and Trade =

Department or Ministry of Foreign Affairs and Trade may refer to:

- Department of Foreign Affairs and Trade (Australia)
- Department of Foreign Affairs and Trade (Ireland)
- Ministry of Foreign Affairs and Foreign Trade (Jamaica)
- Ministry of Foreign Affairs and Trade (New Zealand)
- Ministry of Foreign Affairs and Trade (South Korea)
