= Jamaica–Venezuela relations =

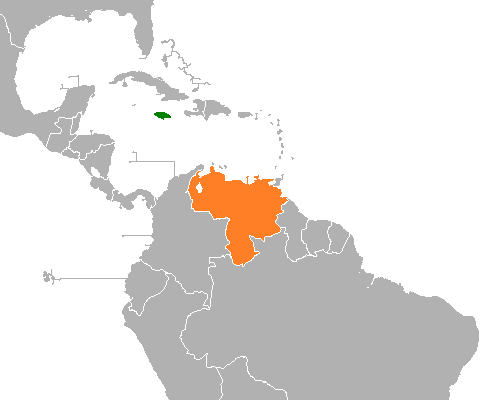

- Jamaica: Venezuela

Jamaica–Venezuela relations refers to the current and historical relationship between Jamaica and Venezuela. Venezuela has an embassy in Kingston, Jamaica. Jamaica closed its embassy in Venezuela in 2019. Both countries are members of the Organization of American States and the Community of Latin American and Caribbean States.

== History ==
Bilateral relations have been largely frozen since 2019, when Jamaica closed its embassy in Caracas due to the Venezuelan presidential crisis.

== Venezuelan assistance ==
Jamaica established an arrangement with Venezuela called the PetroCaribe Development Fund. The former chief executive of the Development Fund stated "Venezuela became the most important source of bilateral assistance in Jamaica through the PetroCaribe arrangement and that literally saved Jamaica financially." Under the arrangement, Jamaica received some 23,000 barrels of oil per day from Venezuela, covering almost 50 per cent of the country's needs in that regard.

The PetroCaribe arrangement was also able to provide grants for housing, school sanitation, assistance to children in the inner-city communities and investment in infrastructures, such as the port in Falmouth, renovation of Norman Manley International Airport. Over the duration of the agreement, Jamaica racked up just over US$3 billion in debt to Venezuela.

In May 2022, it was reported that the Jamaican government was "willing to explore the possibility of a new oil deal with Venezuela, it is highly unlikely that anything will happen unless there is a green light from Washington signalling that it is safe to proceed."

== High level visits ==
The President of Venezuela Nicolás Maduro visited Jamaica in September 2015 and May 2016.

== See also ==
- Foreign relations of Jamaica
- Foreign relations of Venezuela
