= Jamaican passport =

Passport issued to citizens of Jamaica

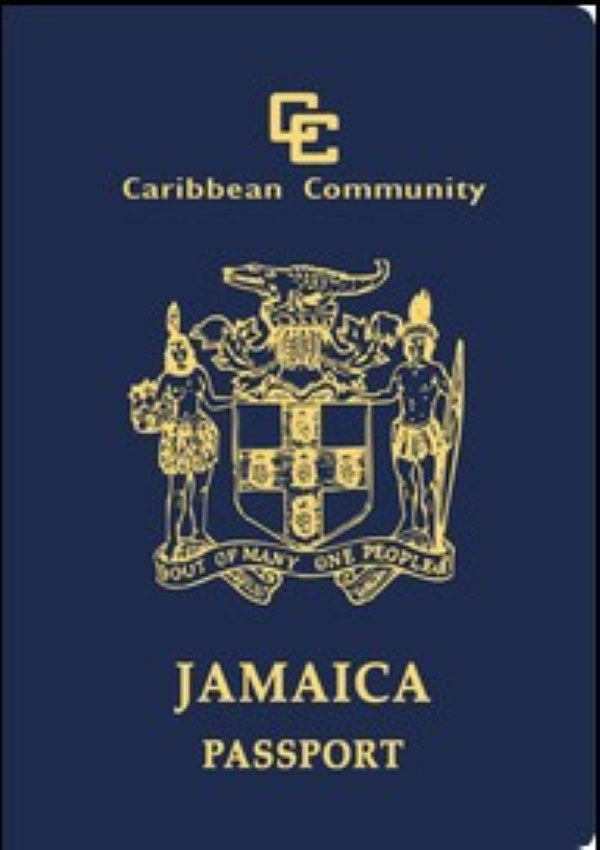
- Type: Passport
- Issued by: Passport, Immigration and Citizenship Agency of Jamaica
- Purpose: Identification & Travel
- Valid in: All countries
- Eligibility: Jamaican citizenship
- Expiration: 5 or 10 years

The Jamaican passport is issued to citizens of Jamaica for international travel. The passport is a CARICOM passport as Jamaica is a member of the Caribbean Community.

Passports are issued through the Passport, Immigration and Citizenship Agency (PICA), which was established in 2007 as an "Executive Agency" of the Government of Jamaica. PICA processes all Jamaican passport applications through its offices in Kingston including for all applications received by its High Commissions and consulates abroad.

As of May 2023, Jamaican citizens had visa-free or visa on arrival access to 103 countries and territories, ranking the Jamaican passport 47th in terms of travel freedom according to the Henley visa restrictions index.

Jamaica began issuing biometric passports, also known as e-passports, to Jamaican citizens on March 31, 2023.

== Passport statement ==
Jamaican passports contain on their inside cover the following words in English:

The Minister of Foreign Affairs requests and requires in the name of the Government of Jamaica all those whom it may concern to allow the bearer to pass freely without let or hindrance and to afford such assistance and protection as may be necessary.

== Physical appearance ==
Regular passports have a blue cover with the Coat of Arms of Jamaica emblazoned on the centre of the front cover in gold foil. The CARICOM logo and words "Caribbean Community" are centred above, and the words "JAMAICA" and "Passport" along with the international symbol e-passport symbol are below the arms. The standard passport contains 48 pages.

The visa pages are blue and contain images of the coat of arms, an ackee plant, and a Swallow-tailed Hummingbird, the national bird of Jamaica. The CARICOM "CC" logo is at the bottom inside corner. Security features include microprinting, holographic images, UV-visible images, intaglio print, latent images, and watermarks, along with other features. The photo is digitally printed onto the biodata page, and the signature is also digitally added to the biodata page.

=== Data page ===
- Photo of the passport holder
- Type: PA
- Issuing Country: listed as "JAM" for "Jamaica"
- Passport No.: 1 letter and 7 numbers
- Surname
- Given Names
- Nationality: "JAMAICAN"
- Date of Birth
- Sex: "F" for female, "M" for male
- Place of Birth
- Place of issue
- Date of Issue
- Issuing Authority
- Date of Expiry

The information page ends with the Machine Readable Zone.

== Changes ==
On March 31, 2023, the Passport, Immigration and Citizenship Agency of Jamaica announced that it would begin issuing electronic passports. These passports have an embedded chip encoded with the bearer's biographical data, including facial image.

The switch to electronic passports brings the Jamaican travel document in line with "more than 150 countries that use E-passports, including 11 of its CARICOM neighbours," according to PICA's CEO Andrew Wynter.

These new passports are issued with 48 pages.

== See also ==
- List of passports
- Visa requirements for Jamaican citizens
