= List of diplomatic missions in Jamaica =

Map of diplomatic missions in Jamaica

This is a list of diplomatic missions in Jamaica. There are currently 29 embassies/high commissions posted in Kingston.

== Embassies/High Commissions in Kingston ==
1. Algeria
2. Argentina
3. Belgium
4. Brazil
5. Canada
6. Chile
7. China
8. Colombia
9. Costa Rica
10. Cuba
11. Dominican Republic
12. France
13. Germany
14. India
15. Japan
16. Kenya
17. Mexico
18. Nicaragua
19. Nigeria
20. Panama
21. Peru
22. Russia
23. South Africa
24. South Korea
25. Spain
26. Trinidad and Tobago
27. United Kingdom
28. United States
29. Venezuela

== Other posts in Kingston ==
- Bahamas (Consulate-General)
- European Union (Delegation)

== Montego Bay ==
- United States (Consular Office)

== Non-resident embassies and high commissions accredited to Jamaica ==
- Afghanistan (Washington DC)
- Angola (Washington, D.C.)
- Armenia (Ottawa)
- Australia (Port-of-Spain)
- Austria (Ottawa)
- Cambodia (Havana)
- Cameroon (New York City)
- Czech Republic (Washington, D.C.)
- Ethiopia (Havana)
- Denmark (Mexico City)
- Finland (Helsinki)
- Gabon (Havana)
- Ghana (Havana)
- Guatemala (Panama City)
- Greece (Mexico City)
- Hungary (Havana)
- Iceland (New York City)
- Indonesia (Havana)
- Ireland (Ottawa)
- Israel (Santo Domingo)
- Italy (Washington, D.C.)
- Ivory Coast (Mexico City)
- Laos (Havana)
- Madagascar (Ottawa)
- Malaysia (Havana)
- Malawi (Brasília)
- Nepal (Ottawa)
- Norway (Havana)
- Pakistan (Washington, D.C.)
- Peru (Panama City)
- Philippines (Washington, D.C.)
- Poland (Caracas)
- Serbia (Mexico City)
- Singapore (Brasília)
- Suriname (Havana)
- Switzerland (Havana)
- Tanzania (Brasília)
- Thailand (Ottawa)
- Timor-Leste (Havana)
- Turkey (Havana)
- Ukraine (Washington, D.C.)
- Uruguay (Havana)
- Vietnam (Havana)
- Zambia (Washington, D.C.)
- Zimbabwe (Havana)

== Closed embassies/high commissions ==
- Guyana (Unknown)
- Haiti
- Honduras (closed in 2014)
- Italy (closed in 2000)
- North Korea (closed in 1993)
- Senegal

== See also ==
- Foreign relations of Jamaica
- Visa requirements for Jamaican citizens
