= Cuba–Jamaica relations =

Billateral relations

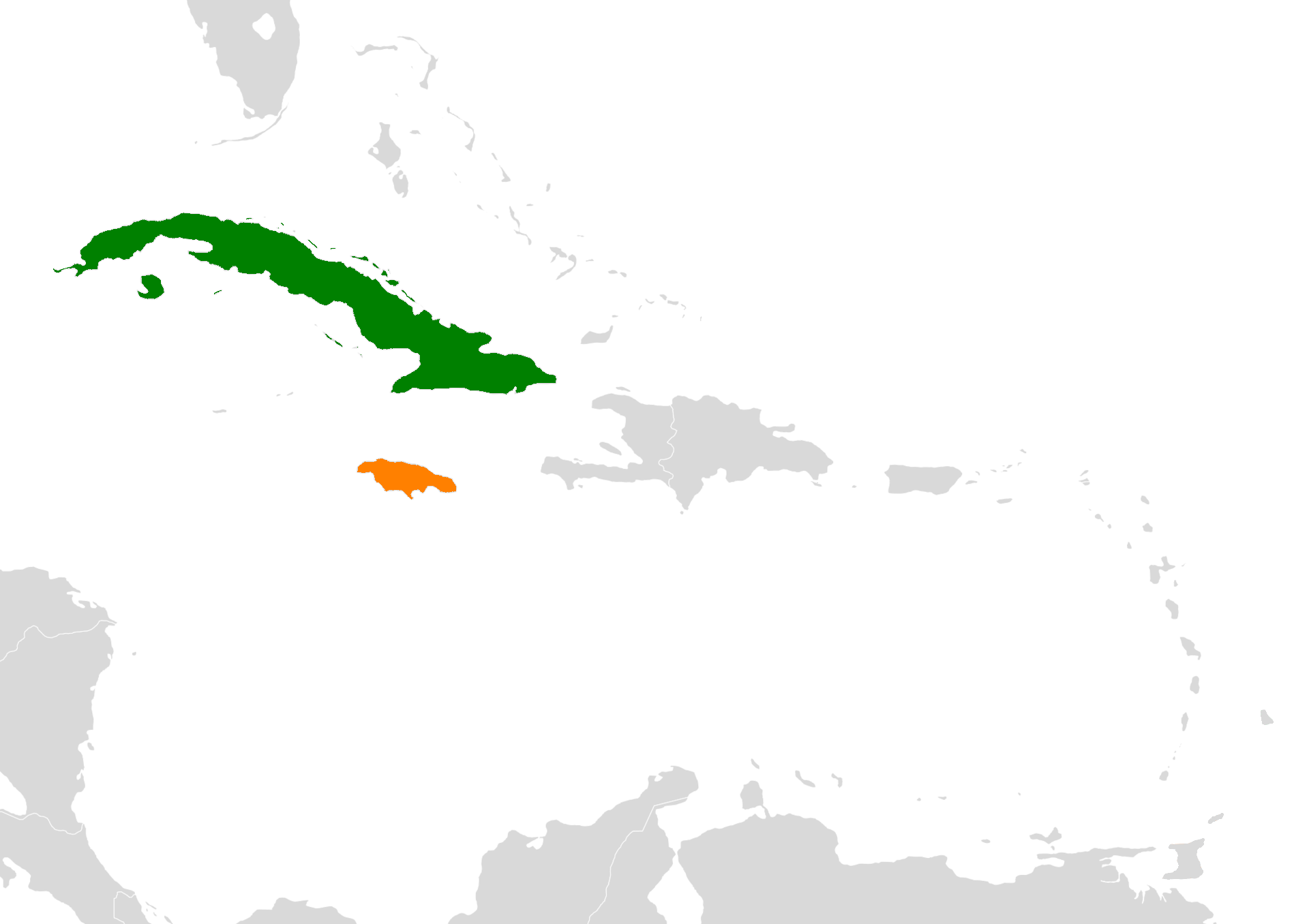

- Cuba: Jamaica

Cuba has an embassy in Kingston and Jamaica has an embassy in Havana. Both countries are members of the Community of Latin American and Caribbean States and the Non-Aligned Movement.

== Aid ==
Cuba has built several schools in Jamaica such as José Martí Technical High School and the G.C. Foster College of Physical Education and Sport and The Fidel Castro Campus of the Anchovy High School in Montpelier, St. James, was opened in 2015.

Cuba has also treated hundreds of Jamaicans for various eye diseases free of charge.

In 2020, Jamaican Senate president Tom Tavares-Finson praised Cuba for providing over 30,000 Jamaicans with free eye care and providing over 500 teachers to teach across Jamaica as well as providing scholarships to Jamaicans to study in Cuban universities.

== Resident diplomatic missions ==
- Cuba has an embassy in Kingston.
- Jamaica has an embassy in Havana.

== See also ==
- Foreign relations of Cuba
- Foreign relations of Jamaica
