= Brazil–Jamaica relations =

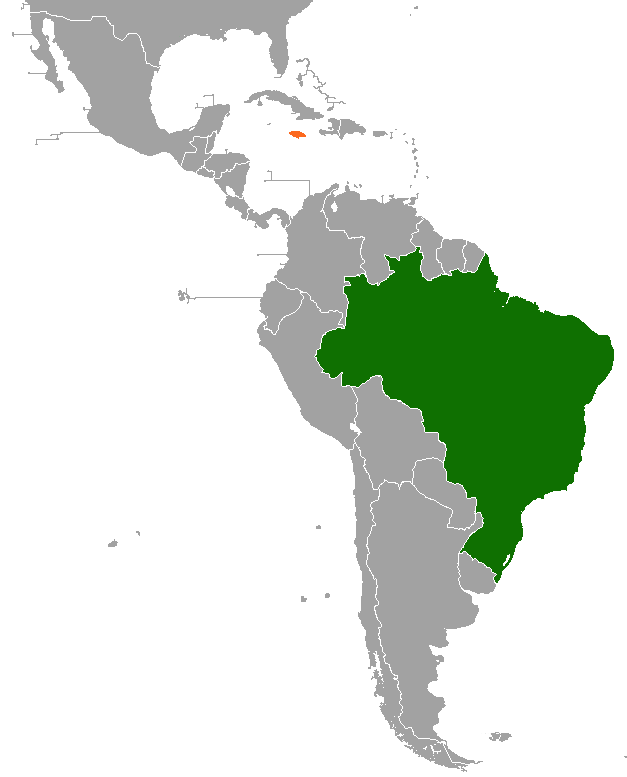

- Brazil: Jamaica

Jamaica and Brazil established diplomatic relations on October 14, 1962. Both countries are full members of the Group of 15 as well as of the Community of Latin American and Caribbean States (CELAC).

Alexandre Ruben Milito Gueiros became Brazil's Ambassador to Jamaica in January 2008. The Government of Jamaica established, in March 2012, a diplomatic mission in Brasília to contribute to strengthening the relations between both countries. Presently Jamaica is represented in Brazil by a Chargé d'Affaires, who heads the new Diplomatic Mission, while the first resident Ambassador prepares to take up her new functions in a couple of months. Jamaica also maintains an Honorary Consul, Mrs. Maria Pia Fauhabar Bastos-Tigre, Attorney-at-Law, located in São Paulo, the major business centre of the country. The Government of Jamaica is currently giving serious consideration to the appointment of Honorary Consuls in the Brazilian cities of Salvador, (State of Bahia) and Manaus, (State of Amazonas), which are located in the Northeast and Norte regions of Brazil, respectively.

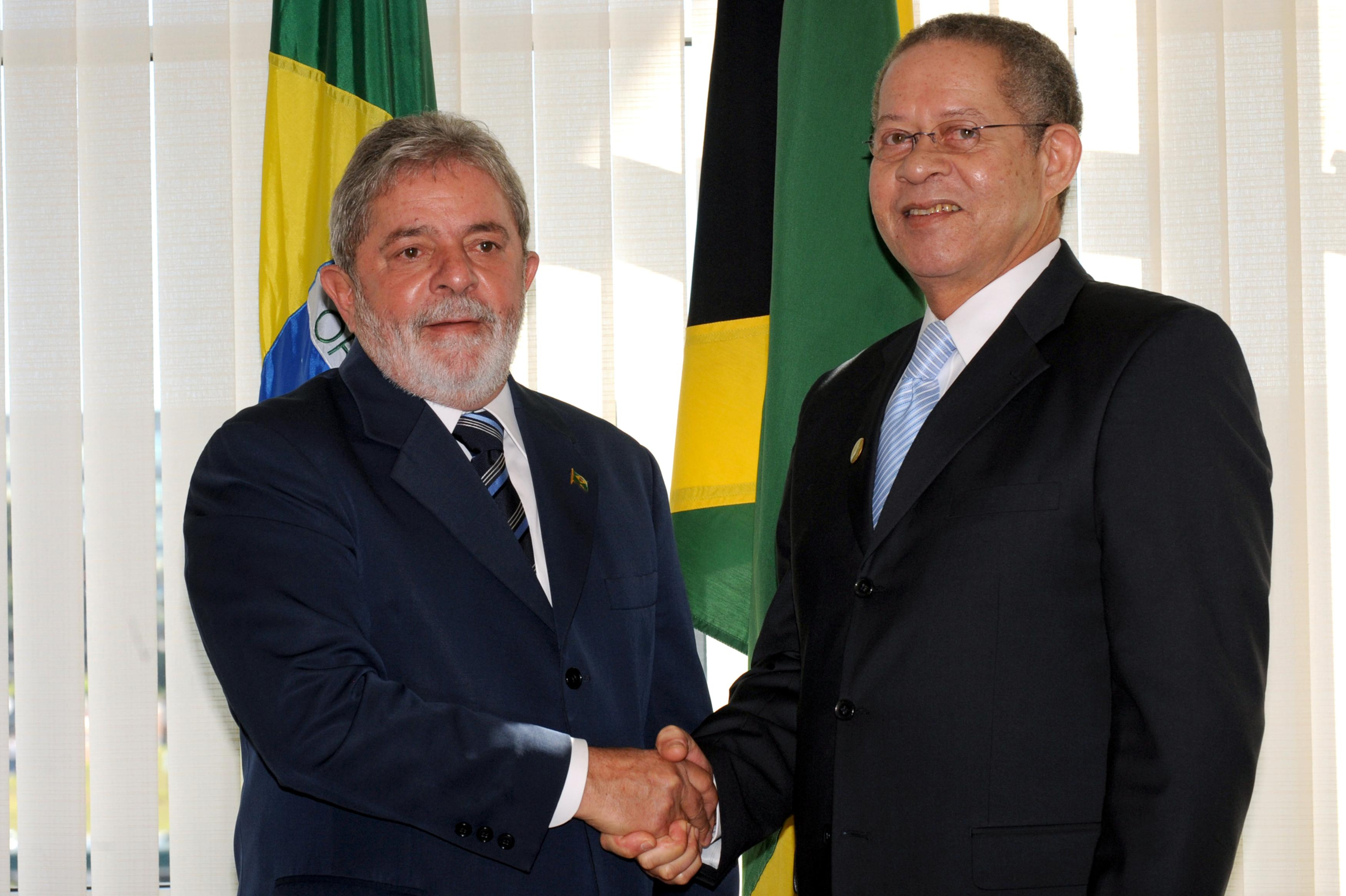
Prime Minister Bruce Golding with the President of Brazil, Lula da Silva.

The move is justified by the following reasons:

- Jamaican nationals residing in Bahia and Amazonas would benefit from having a Jamaican representative in those regions.
- Jamaica is currently developing a strategy to attract investments from Brazil, as well as promoting export opportunities for Jamaican products.
- Brazil's strength in the creative industries, specifically in the State of Bahia and its proximity to the Caribbean sea renders it a good air link connection point.
- Salvador and Bahia shares a cultural affinity with Jamaica and is regarded as the cultural hub of Brazil.

Jamaica and Brazil have enjoyed strong relations over the years and the extent of collaboration is evident both at the bilateral and multilateral levels. At the bilateral level, relations have between further enhanced in recent times as a result of the increased number of high and technical level visits, as well as, the active pursuit of technical cooperation programmes in areas such as energy and agriculture.

== Common interests ==
Both nations have made commitments to ecological preservation of protected environments under the Escazú Agreement that include the rights to access to information, public participation, and access to justice in environmental matters. It also provides for the protection of the inter generational right to a healthy environment and the protection of environmental defenders, effectively binding the nations in agreement. Both nations also hold embassies in one another's countries with the Brazilian embassy being located on 23 Millsborough Crescent, Kingston Jamaica, and the Jamaican embassy in St. de Habitações 71610-045, Brazil.

== See also ==
- Foreign relations of Jamaica
- Foreign relations of Brazil
