= Visa policy of Jamaica =

Policy on permits required to enter Jamaica

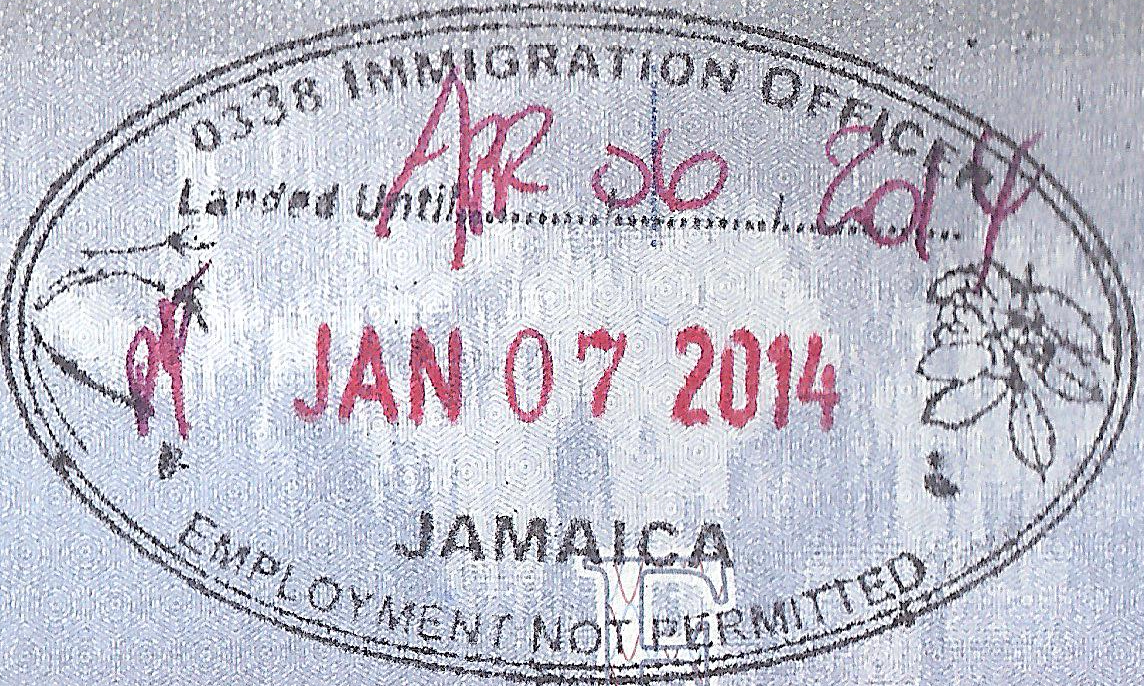
Entry stamp

Visitors to Jamaica must obtain a visa from one of the Jamaican diplomatic missions unless they are citizens of one of the visa-exempt countries or citizens who may obtain a visa on arrival.

== Visa policy map ==
Visa policy of Jamaica Jamaica Visa not required (180 days) Visa not required (90 days) Visa not required (30 days) Visa not required (30 days) if holding a valid Canadian, Schengen, UK or US visa; otherwise, visa required Visa on arrival Visa required

== Visa exemption ==
=== Ordinary passports ===
Citizens of the following countries and territories may enter Jamaica without a visa for business or tourist purposes for stays up to the duration listed below. The stay may be extended for a maximum of 12 months for Commonwealth citizens, or for a maximum of 6 months for Non-Commonwealth citizens.

180 days

- Dominican Republic

6 months

- United States^{1}

90 days

- Anguilla
- Antigua and Barbuda
- Australia
- Bahamas
- Bangladesh
- Barbados
- Belgium
- Belize
- Bermuda
- Botswana
- Brazil
- Brunei
- Canada
- Chile
- Cyprus
- Denmark
- Dominica
- Eswatini
- Fiji
- Finland
- Gambia
- Germany
- Ghana
- Gibraltar
- Grenada
- Guyana
- Iceland
- India
- Ireland
- Israel
- Italy
- Kenya
- Kiribati
- Lesotho
- Liechtenstein
- Luxembourg
- Malawi
- Malaysia
- Maldives
- Malta
- Mauritius
- Mexico
- Mozambique
- Namibia
- Nauru
- Netherlands
- New Zealand
- Norway
- Papua New Guinea
- Russia^{2}
- Saint Helena
- San Marino
- Seychelles
- Sierra Leone
- Singapore
- Solomon Islands
- South Africa
- Saint Kitts and Nevis
- Saint Lucia
- Saint Vincent and the Grenadines
- Samoa
- South Korea
- Suriname
- Sweden
- Switzerland
- Tanzania
- Tonga
- Trinidad and Tobago
- Turkey
- Turks and Caicos
- Tuvalu
- Vanuatu
- Uganda
- United Kingdom
- Zambia

30 days

- Argentina
- Austria
- Bolivia^{T}
- China^{T}
- Colombia
- Costa Rica
- Czech Republic^{T}
- Ecuador
- El Salvador^{T}
- Estonia^{3}
- France
- Greece
- Guatemala^{T}
- Hong Kong
- Hungary^{T}
- Japan
- Latvia^{T 3}
- Lithuania^{T 3}
- Macau^{T}
- Monaco
- Panama^{T}
- Paraguay^{T}
- Peru^{T}
- Poland
- Portugal
- Slovakia^{T}
- Slovenia^{T 3}
- Spain
- Ukraine^{T}
- Uruguay
- Venezuela

_{T - For tourist purposes only.}
_{1 - 6 months within a year.}
_{2 - 90 days within a year.}
_{3 - For holders of vaccination certificate for Measles, Polio and Rubella only.}

Date of visa changes
- 4 March 1968: Israel
- 7 April 1968: Liechtenstein and Switzerland
- 14 May 1968: Mexico
- 24 October 1968: France
- 3 August 1970: Turkey
- 16 August 1970: Spain
- 23 November 1970: Austria
- 1 December 1970: Belgium, Luxembourg and Netherlands
- 24 September 1973: Italy
- 27 November 1993: South Korea
- 4 February 2025: Dominican Republic

==== Substitute visa ====
Citizens of Honduras who hold a valid visa issued by any Schengen Area member state, Canada, the United Kingdom or the United States may enter Jamaica without a visa for up to 30 days, if they are travelling only for tourist purposes.

Citizens of Albania, Belarus, Bosnia and Herzegovina, Bulgaria, Croatia, Kazakhstan, Moldova, Montenegro, North Macedonia, Romania and Serbia who hold a valid visa issued by any Schengen Area member state, Canada, the United Kingdom or the United States, and a proof that they are immunized against measles, rubella and polio, may enter Jamaica without a visa for up to 30 days, if they are travelling only for tourist purposes. Even though Bulgaria, Croatia and Romania are members of the Schengen Area, this does not mean that entry is visa-free.

=== Non-ordinary passports ===
In addition to countries whose citizens are visa-exempt, holders of diplomatic, official, service or special passports of Cuba and United Arab Emirates may enter Jamaica without a visa.

== Visa on arrival ==
Citizens of the following countries and territories may obtain a visa on arrival for 100 USD:

- Albania
- Andorra
- Armenia
- Azerbaijan
- Belarus
- Bosnia and Herzegovina
- British Virgin Islands
- Bulgaria
- Croatia
- Georgia
- Kazakhstan
- Kosovo
- Kyrgyzstan
- Moldova
- Montenegro
- North Macedonia
- Romania
- Serbia
- Tajikistan
- Turkmenistan
- Uzbekistan

In addition, citizens of Taiwan with an "Affadivit of Identity" traveling as tourists may obtain a visa on arrival.

== Transit without visa ==
Generally, passengers can transit without a visa for a maximum of 72 hours. However, citizens of Cuba require a visa for all purposes including transit.

== Unconditional Landing Stamp ==
A visa is not required for holders of passports or other travel documents of any country endorsed with an "Unconditional Landing" stamp issued by Jamaican authorities.

== Visitor statistics ==
Most visitors arriving in Jamaica were from the following countries of nationality:

Country/Territory	2017	2016	2015	2014	2013
United States	1,509,963	1,406,058	1,344,149	1,296,457	1,271,262
Canada	405,174	372,137	391,409	419,898	399,331
United Kingdom	217,647	206,470	199,002	177,216	151,315
Germany	29,858	20,768	20,528	21,346	19,658
Cayman Islands	18,150	17,625	16,825	15,623	16,234
Italy	13,699	12,893	9,482	8,692	7,808
Trinidad and Tobago	10,578	11,399	11,282	10,840	11,437
Netherlands	8,226	6,652	6,589	6,040	5,515
Sweden	7,732	10,610	8,746	7,622	3,217
Spain	7,677	3,387	2,996	2,537	2,569
France	7,400	5,277	5,046	10,100	12,087
Belgium	6,488	5,996	5,319	4,930	4,703
Bahamas	5,988	6,037	5,581	5,269	5,216
Argentina	5,545	3,269	3,431	4,037	4,625
Brazil	5,304	2,782	3,249	2,925	2,771
Chile	5,261	4,350	5,348	4,527	5,005
Total	2,352,915	2,181,684	2,123,042	2,080,181	2,008,409

== See also ==
- Visa requirements for Jamaican citizens
