= Canada–Jamaica relations =

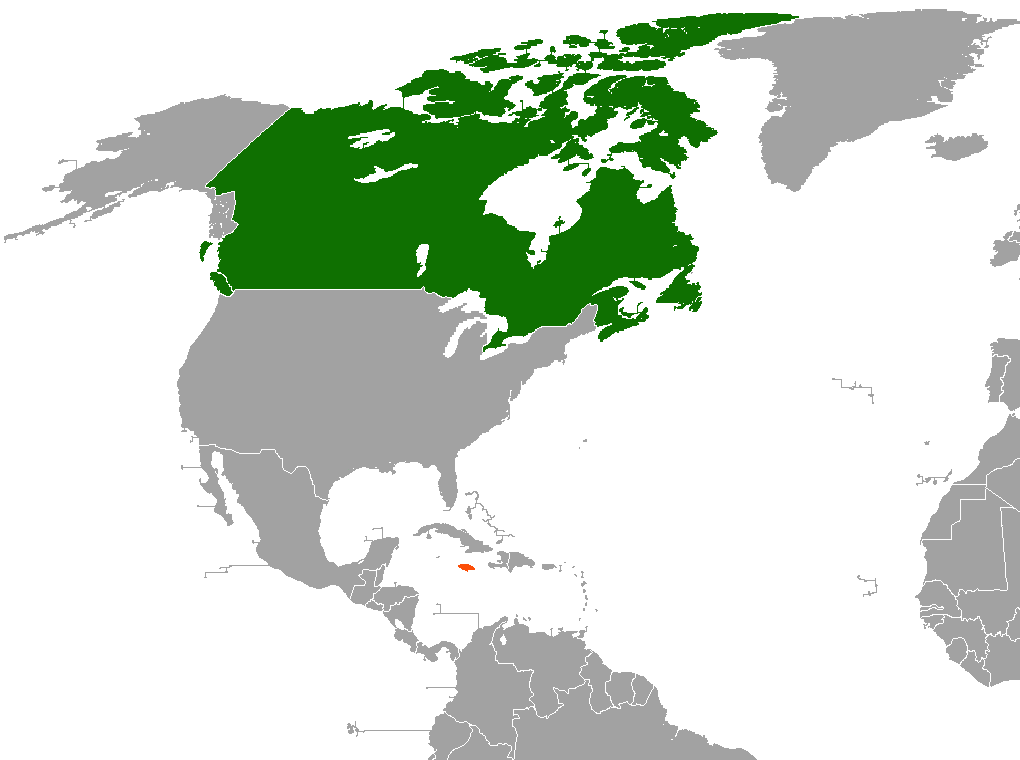

- Canada: Jamaica

Canada and Jamaica established diplomatic relations in 1962. Both countries are full members of the Organization of American States and of the Commonwealth of Nations.

Jamaican-Canadians celebrate their island heritage through festivals held in major cities across Canada, the most recognized of which is Caribana. Caribana is held in Toronto, Ontario every year and attracts over one million visitors to the region, many of whom fly all the way from Jamaica.

== Agreements ==
Canada has an agreement with the Jamaican government to allow the Canadian Forces a staging area to move troops and supplies for humanitarian assistance and possible anti-terrorism operations.

== Resident diplomatic missions ==
- Canada has a high commission in Kingston.
- Jamaica has a high commission in Ottawa and a consulate-general in Toronto.

== High level visits ==
On April 20, 2009, Canadian Prime Minister Stephen Harper became the first Canadian head of government to address the Jamaican parliament.

== Diaspora ==
The population of Jamaican Canadians, according to Canada's 2021 Census, is 249,070. Jamaican Canadians comprise about 30% of the entire Black Canadian population.

== See also ==
- Foreign relations of Canada
- Foreign relations of Jamaica
