= Jamaica–Mexico relations =

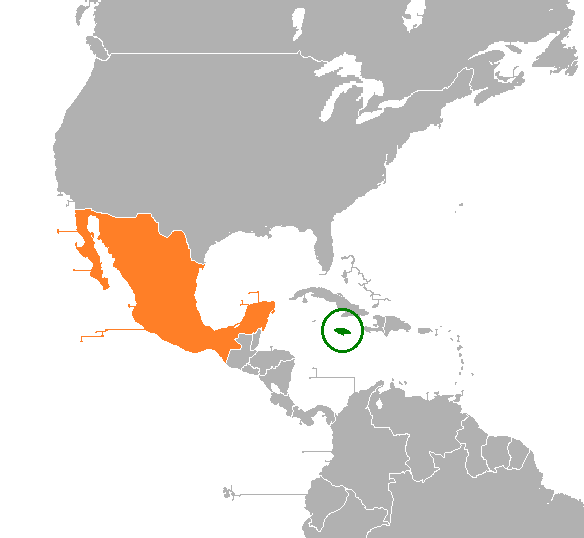

- Jamaica: Mexico

The nations of Jamaica and Mexico established diplomatic relations in 1966. Both nations are members of the Association of Caribbean States, Community of Latin American and Caribbean States, Organization of American States and the United Nations.

== History ==
Jamaica and Mexico are two American nations with a common history. Both nations had been under control of the Spanish Empire and Jamaica was governed from the Viceroyal of New Spain based in Mexico City. In May 1655, Jamaica became under British rule until its independence in August 1962. Diplomatic relations between Jamaica and Mexico were established on 18 March 1966. At the time, Mexico saw Jamaica as a leader of English speaking Caribbean nations.

Since the establishment of diplomatic relations, both nations have worked together in numerous international forums such as the Association of Caribbean States, Community of Latin American and Caribbean States and the Organization of American States (OAS) where in 1970s, both Jamaica and Mexico were the only nations to actively protest against the exclusion of Cuba from the OAS and called for the normalization of relations with the Cuban government.

In 1974, Mexican President Luis Echeverría paid an official visit to Jamaica. In 1975, Jamaican Prime Minister Michael Manley paid a visit to Mexico. Since then, there have been several high-level visits between leaders of both nations.

In September 2021, Jamaican Foreign Minister Kamina Johnson Smith traveled to Mexico to attend the VI CELAC summit. In July 2023, Foreign Minister Kamina Johnson Smith and Mexican Foreign Secretary Alicia Bárcena met in Belgium where they signed the Final Act of the 10th Mexico-Jamaica Permanent Binational Commission, a framework for collaboration between the two countries aimed at strengthening trade, investment and cooperation opportunities as well as advancing diplomatic relations. In March 2024, Foreign Secretary Alicia Bárcena paid a visit to Jamaica.

== High-level visits ==
High-level visits from Jamaica to Mexico

- Prime Minister Michael Manley (1975, 1980, 1989)
- Prime Minister P. J. Patterson (1993, 2004)
- Foreign Minister Kenneth Baugh (2008)
- Prime Minister Portia Simpson-Miller (2014)
- Foreign Minister Kamina Johnson Smith (2021)

High-level visits from Mexico to Jamaica

- President Luis Echeverría (1974)
- President Miguel de la Madrid Hurtado (1987)
- President Carlos Salinas de Gortari (1990)
- President Vicente Fox (2005)
- Foreign Secretary Patricia Espinosa (2009)
- Foreign Secretary Luis Videgaray Caso (2018)
- Foreign Secretary Alicia Bárcena (2024)

== Bilateral relations ==
Both nations have signed several bilateral agreements such as an Agreement on the Suppression of Visa Requirements for Ordinary Passport Holders (1968); Agreement on Trade (1975); Agreement on Tourism Cooperation (1990); Agreement on Cultural Cooperation (1990); Agreement of Cooperation to Combat Drug Trafficking and Drug Dependency (1990); Agreement on Scientific and Technical Cooperation (1996); Agreement on the Suppression of Visa Requirements for Diplomatic and Official Passport Holders (2007); Agreement of Air Transportation (2009) and an Agreement to Avoid Double Taxation and Prevent Fiscal Evasion in the Matter of Income Taxes and its Protocol (2016).

== Trade ==
In 2023, total trade between Jamaica and Mexico amounted to US$106 million. Jamaica's main exports to Mexico include: food products, paper and cardboard, electronic integrated circuits, articles and jewelry for parts, and machine tools and parts. Mexico's main exports to Jamaica include: home appliances and furniture, food products, motor cars and vehicles, and essential oils for beauty and soap products. Mexican multinational companies such as Cemex and Grupo Aeroportuario del Pacífico operate in Jamaica.

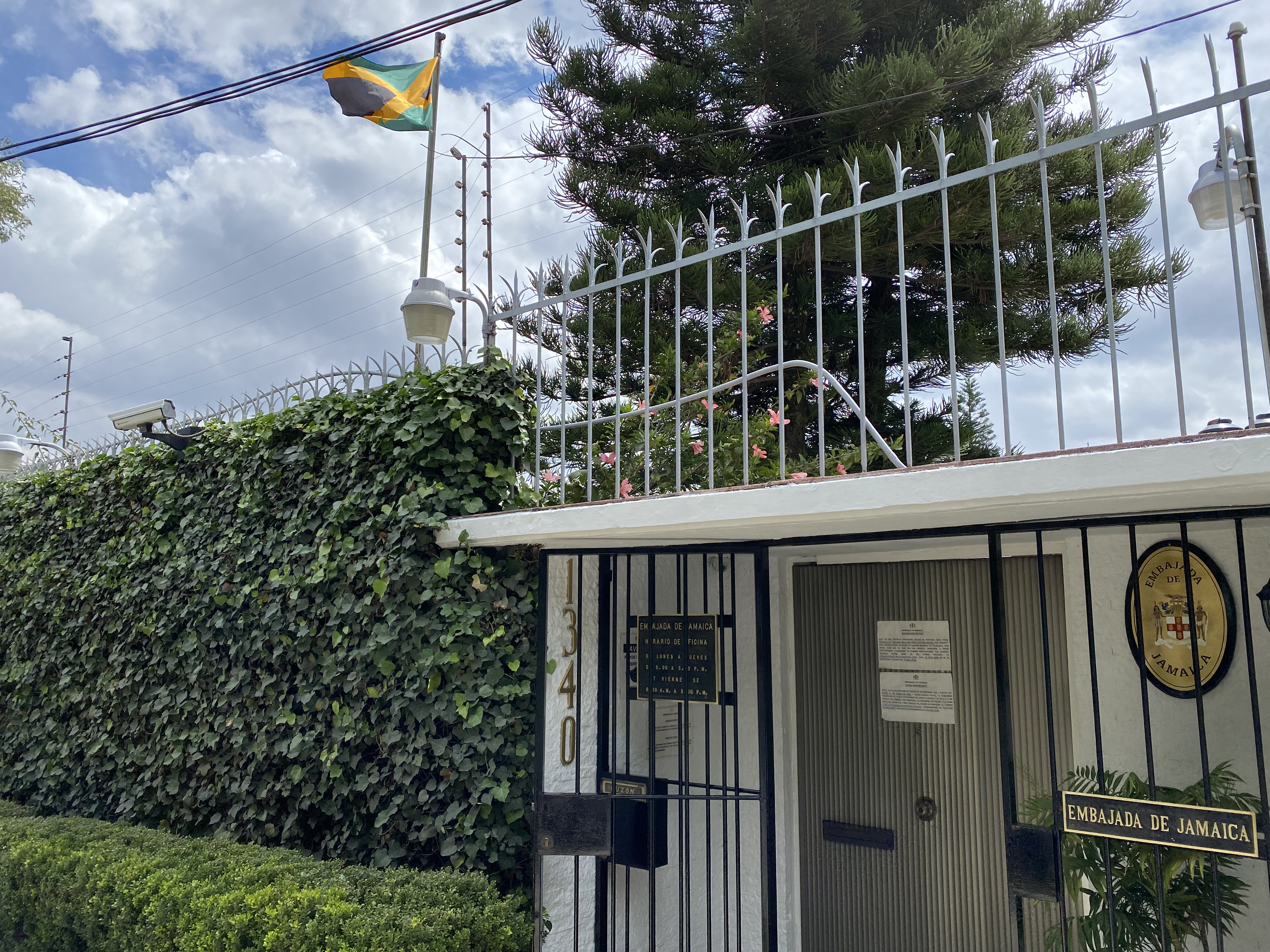
Embassy of Jamaica in Mexico City

== Resident diplomatic missions ==
- Jamaica has an embassy in Mexico City.
- Mexico has an embassy in Kingston.

== See also ==
- Metro Jamaica
