= Jamaica–Malaysia relations =

- Jamaica: Malaysia

Jamaica and Malaysia established diplomatic relations in 1975. Neither country has a resident ambassador in the other.

Both Prime Minister of Jamaica Portia Simpson Miller and Prime Minister of Malaysia Abdullah Ahmad Badawi, have expressed satisfaction with the progress of bilateral relations between the two countries and have reaffirmed their commitment to strengthening these relations through the exchange of visits and co-operation in the economic, technological, shipping, health and educational sectors, among other areas. Both countries are also the members of Commonwealth of Nations, Group of 77, Group of 15 and Non-Aligned Movement.

== Economic relations ==
In 1995, Jamaican exports to Malaysia worth around $18,570 while Malaysian exports to Jamaica with $3 million. A number of Malaysian investors also had started to explore any opportunities in Jamaica especially in tourism and other industry. Both countries have agreed to explore a joint-venture in oil and gas industry and has working together in the construction of Highway 2000 that connects Kingston, Jamaica with Montego Bay.

== Sporting relations ==
While in sports, Malaysia has keen to get a coaches from Jamaica for several sports such as in netball, hockey and badminton.
