= Foreign relations of Jamaica =

Jamaica has diplomatic relations with many nations and is a member of the United Nations and the Organization of American States. Jamaica chairs the Working Group on smaller Economies.

Jamaica is an active member of the Commonwealth of Nations and the Non-Aligned Movement (G-77). Jamaica is a beneficiary of the Lome Conventions, through which the European Union (EU) grants trade preferences to selected states in Asia, the Caribbean, and the Pacific, and has played a leading role in the negotiations of the successor agreement in Fiji in 2000.

Jamaica has been a member of the Forum of Small States (FOSS) since the group's founding in 1992.

Disputes - international: none

Illicit drugs: Transshipment point for cocaine from Central and South America to North America and Europe; illicit cultivation of cannabis; government has an active manual cannabis eradication program

The Ministry of Foreign Affairs and Foreign Trade is the government ministry responsible for handling Jamaica's external relations and foreign trade.

== History ==
Historically, Jamaica has had close ties with the UK. Trade, financial, and cultural relations with the United States are now predominant. Jamaica is linked with the other countries of the English-speaking Caribbean through the Caribbean Community (CARICOM), and more broadly through the Association of Caribbean States (ACS). Jamaica has served two 2-year terms on the United Nations Security Council, in 1979-80 and 2000-2001.

In the follow-on meetings to the December 1994 Summit of the Americas, Jamaica—together with Uruguay—was given the responsibility of coordinating discussions on invigorating society.

== Diplomatic relations ==
List of countries which Jamaica maintains diplomatic relations with:

#	Country	Date
1	United Kingdom	2 August 1962
2	Canada	2 August 1962
3	Netherlands	2 August 1962
4	United States	6 August 1962
5	France	6 August 1962
6	Germany	6 August 1962
7	India	12 August 1962
8	Israel	29 August 1962
9	South Korea	13 October 1962
10	Brazil	14 October 1962
11	Switzerland	12 December 1962
12	Luxembourg	2 January 1963
13	Pakistan	19 January 1963
14	Italy	14 February 1963
15	Argentina	25 March 1963
16	Lebanon	7 May 1963
17	Trinidad and Tobago	18 June 1963
18	Chile	18 December 1963
19	Japan	16 March 1964
20	Egypt	10 June 1964
21	Dominican Republic	4 December 1964
22	Colombia	24 February 1965
23	Venezuela	25 March 1965
24	Ethiopia	22 March 1966
25	Panama	29 July 1966
26	Spain	21 December 1966
27	Mexico	4 February 1967
28	Belgium	25 July 1967
29	Austria	2 November 1967
30	Sierra Leone	15 November 1967
31	Ghana	8 May 1968
32	Barbados	6 September 1968
33	Serbia	11 October 1968
34	Guyana	20 June 1969
35	Peru	29 April 1970
36	Nigeria	29 April 1970
37	Zambia	25 February 1971
38	Turkey	30 March 1971
39	Tanzania	6 April 1971
40	Costa Rica	21 July 1971
41	Cyprus	31 August 1972
42	China	21 November 1972
43	Cuba	8 December 1972
44	Bahamas	10 July 1973
45	Ecuador	10 September 1973
46	Bangladesh	5 November 1973
47	Australia	7 January 1974
48	Sweden	5 February 1974
49	Mauritius	20 May 1974
50	Romania	21 August 1974
51	New Zealand	27 August 1974
52	North Korea	9 October 1974
53	Denmark	14 October 1974
54	Kuwait	14 November 1974
55	Grenada	21 January 1975
56	Guinea	30 January 1975
57	Iraq	30 January 1975
58	Algeria	30 January 1975
59	Iran	18 February 1975
60	Honduras	10 March 1975
61	Russia	12 March 1975
62	Poland	14 May 1975
63	Greece	15 May 1975
64	Hungary	2 June 1975
65	Czech Republic	3 June 1975
66	Nicaragua	15 August 1975
67	Burkina Faso	20 September 1975
68	Suriname	26 November 1975
69	Malaysia	28 November 1975
70	Vietnam	5 January 1976
71	Senegal	8 January 1976
72	Kenya	19 March 1976
73	Libya	24 June 1976
74	Saudi Arabia	15 August 1976
75	Bulgaria	22 March 1977
76	Norway	7 October 1977
77	Finland	1 December 1977
78	Dominica	3 November 1978
79	Seychelles	15 January 1979
80	Saint Lucia	22 February 1979
81	Portugal	26 February 1979
82	Niger	25 June 1979
—	Holy See	29 July 1979
83	Mozambique	7 August 1979
84	Republic of the Congo	6 September 1979
85	Yemen	12 September 1979
86	Lesotho	19 October 1979
87	Fiji	11 December 1979
88	São Tomé and Príncipe	29 February 1980
89	Zimbabwe	18 April 1980
90	Philippines	15 May 1980
91	Haiti	26 August 1981
92	Indonesia	17 December 1981
93	Botswana	4 May 1982
94	Belize	3 November 1982
95	Saint Vincent and the Grenadines	3 December 1982
96	Antigua and Barbuda	8 February 1983
97	Saint Kitts and Nevis	19 September 1983
98	Bolivia	2 February 1984
99	Thailand	10 September 1984
100	Uruguay	23 May 1985
101	Oman	27 May 1986
102	Vanuatu	23 July 1987
103	Maldives	27 February 1990
104	Namibia	28 August 1990
105	El Salvador	13 November 1990
106	Eswatini	13 February 1991
107	Papua New Guinea	16 April 1991
108	Cameroon	26 September 1991
109	Guatemala	11 December 1991
110	Latvia	18 December 1991
111	Ukraine	7 July 1992
112	Singapore	1 November 1992
113	Paraguay	10 November 1992
114	Slovakia	1 January 1993
115	Estonia	16 February 1993
116	Belarus	6 June 1993
117	South Africa	9 September 1993
118	Kazakhstan	27 July 1995
119	Lithuania	20 October 1995
120	Gabon	23 October 1995
121	Azerbaijan	22 November 1995
122	Armenia	1 December 1995
123	Albania	3 April 1996
124	Moldova	9 July 1996
125	Turkmenistan	16 July 1996
126	Slovenia	23 July 1996
127	Georgia	31 July 1996
128	Uzbekistan	8 August 1996
129	Bosnia and Herzegovina	9 October 1996
130	Croatia	9 October 1996
131	Ireland	7 December 1997
132	Sri Lanka	29 September 1998
133	Rwanda	6 November 1998
134	Cape Verde	22 March 1999
135	Laos	27 August 1999
136	Malawi	30 September 1999
137	Myanmar	6 December 1999
138	Kyrgyzstan	25 February 2000
139	Iceland	23 May 2000
140	Angola	8 October 2002
141	North Macedonia	1 April 2003
—	Cook Islands	14 May 2003
142	Qatar	27 June 2003
143	Mali	17 December 2003
144	Malta	27 October 2004
145	Sudan	19 September 2005
146	Benin	25 April 2006
147	Morocco	29 January 2008
148	Monaco	4 April 2008
149	Cambodia	12 January 2010
150	Montenegro	12 November 2010
151	Nauru	24 February 2011
152	United Arab Emirates	4 March 2011
153	Brunei	20 June 2011
154	Uganda	21 September 2011
155	Gambia	29 November 2011
156	Mongolia	26 October 2012
157	Solomon Islands	3 July 2013
158	Andorra	23 September 2014
159	Timor-Leste	27 September 2014
160	Equatorial Guinea	18 May 2015
161	Nepal	1 October 2015
162	Tajikistan	11 December 2017
163	Bahrain	28 September 2018
164	San Marino	29 September 2020
165	Togo	23 November 2021
166	Kiribati	26 April 2022
167	Samoa	26 April 2022
168	Palau	28 April 2022
169	Liberia	22 September 2022
170	Marshall Islands	23 September 2022
171	Liechtenstein	18 September 2023
172	Jordan	23 September 2023
173	Eritrea	17 November 2023
174	Tunisia	26 September 2024
175	Ivory Coast	16 December 2024

== Bilateral relations ==
Country	Formal Relations Began	Notes
Belize	3 November 1982	Belize and Jamaica are two of fifteen commonwealth realms, members of: the Association of Caribbean States, the Caribbean Community, the Belt & Road Initiative, the Caribbean Development Bank, the Commonwealth of Nations, ECLAC, EU-CARIFORUM, the Organisation of African, Caribbean and Pacific States, the Organization of American States, the Small Island Developing States, and the United Nations.: Both countries established diplomatic relations on November 3, 1982.; Both countries are full members of the Organization of American States and of the Caribbean Community.
Brazil	14 October 1962	See Jamaica–Brazil relations Jamaica and Brazil established diplomatic relations on October 14, 1962. Both countries are full members of the Group of 15.
Canada	1962	See Canada–Jamaica relations Canada and Jamaica are two of fifteen commonwealth realms, members of: the Commonwealth of Nations, the Organization of American States, and the United Nations. Both countries established diplomatic relations in 1962. Since March 4, 1963, Canada has a high commission in Kingston. Jamaica has a high commission in Ottawa. On April 15, 2009, Canadian Prime Minister Stephen Harper became the first Canadian head of government to address the Jamaican parliament. There are 231,000 people of Jamaican descent living in Canada. Jamaican-Canadians celebrate their island heritage through festivals held in major cities across Canada, the most recognized of which is Caribana. Caribana is held in Toronto, Ontario every year and attracts over one million visitors to the region, many of whom fly all the way from Jamaica.: See also Jamaican Canadian; Canadian Ministry of Foreign Affairs and International Trade about relations with Jamaica; Canadian high commission in Kingston; Jamaican high commission in Ottawa
Cuba	1972	See Cuba–Jamaica relations Prime Minister Percival James Patterson visited Cuba at the end of May 1997. In the fall of 1997, Jamaica upgraded its consulate in Havana to an embassy, and the nonresident Jamaican ambassador to Cuba was replaced by a resident ambassador.
China	21 November 1972	See China–Jamaica relations Relations from November 21, 1972. China has an embassy in Kingston, Jamaica. Jamaica has an embassy in Beijing.
Ghana		See Ghana-Jamaica relations Ghana, as the former Gold Coast, and Jamaica share historical links through the slave trade and forced Ashanti/Akan emigration to the Caribbean. Ghana and Jamaica have a Joint Permanent Commission, and there are plans for Ghanaian investment in Jamaica.
Guyana	26 May 1966	Both countries established diplomatic relations on May 26, 1966.; Both countries are full members of the Organization of American States, of the Caribbean Community, and of the Commonwealth of Nations.
Haiti		See Haiti–Jamaica relations Haiti has an embassy in Kingston and Jamaica has an honorary consul in Port-au-Prince, Haiti. In January, 2007, Haitian president René Préval, made a four-day working visit to Jamaica. At a press conference, Jamaican prime minister Portia Simpson Miller announced that a Joint Jamaica/Haiti Commission would be convened later that year.
India		See India–Jamaica relations Both nations inherited many cultural and political connections from British colonisation, such as membership in the Commonwealth of Nations, parliamentary democracy, the English language and cricket. India has a High Commission in Kingston, whilst Jamaica has a consulate in New Delhi.
Malaysia		See Jamaica–Malaysia relations
Mexico	18 March 1966	See Jamaica–Mexico relations Both nations established diplomatic relations on 18 March 1966.: Jamaica has an embassy in Mexico City.; Mexico has an embassy in Kingston.
Netherlands		Jamaica is accredited to the Netherlands from its embassy in Brussels, Belgium.; the Netherlands is accredited to Jamaica from its embassy in Havana, Cuba.
South Korea	13 October 1962	The establishment of diplomatic relations between the Republic of Korea and the Jamaica started on October 13, 1962 .: Jamaica has an embassy in Seoul, South Korea.; South Korea has an embassy in Kingston Jamaica.
Turkey	1970	See Jamaica–Turkey relations: Turkish Embassy in Havana is accredited to Jamaica.; Trade volume between the two countries was US$90.5 million in 2019 (Jamaican exports/imports: US$0.5/90 million).
United Kingdom	1962	See Jamaica–United Kingdom relations The UK established diplomatic relations with the United Kingdom on 2 August 1962. Both countries are Commonwealth Realms.: Jamaica maintains a high commission in London.; The United Kingdom is accredited to Jamaica through its high commission in Kingston.; The UK governed Jamaica from 1655 to 1962, when Jamaica achieved full independence. Both countries share common membership of the Caribbean Development Bank, the Commonwealth, the International Criminal Court, and the World Trade Organization, as well as the CARIFORUM–UK Economic Partnership Agreement. Bilaterally the two countries have an Investment Agreement.
United States		See Jamaica–United States relations Embassy of Jamaica in Washington, D.C. The United States maintains close and productive relations with the Government of Jamaica. Former prime minister Patterson visited Washington, DC, several times after assuming office in 1992. In April 2001, Prime Minister Patterson and other Caribbean leaders met with President George W. Bush during the Summit of the Americas in Quebec, Canada, at which a "Third Border Initiative" was launched to deepen U.S. cooperation with Caribbean nations and enhance economic development and integration of the Caribbean nations. Then-Prime Minister Portia Simpson Miller attended the "Conference on the Caribbean--A 20/20 Vision" in Washington in June 2007. President Barack Obama visited the island on April 9. 2015. President Obama managed to squeeze in some fun in between meetings with Jamaican and Caribbean leaders on his trip to Jamaica this week—from paying homage to reggae star Bob Marley to practising his own Jamaican accent. The United States is Jamaica's most important trading partner: bilateral trade in goods in 2005 was over $2 billion. Jamaica is a popular destination for American tourists; more than 1.2 million Americans visited in 2006. Also, some 10,000 American citizens, including many dual-nationals born on the island, permanently reside in Jamaica.

Jamaica maintains economic and cultural relations with Taiwan via Taipei Economic and Cultural Office in Canada.

== Jamaica and the Commonwealth ==
Jamaica has been a member state of the Commonwealth of Nations since 1962 when it became an independent Commonwealth realm.

== Multilateral membership ==
- African, Caribbean and Pacific Group of States
- Caricom
- CCC
- Caribbean Development Bank
- United Nations Economic Commission for Latin America and the Caribbean
- Food and Agriculture Organization
- G-15
- G-33
- G-77
- Inter-American Development Bank
- International Atomic Energy Agency
- International Bank for Reconstruction and Development
- International Civil Aviation Organization
- International Red Cross and Red Crescent Movement
- International Fund for Agricultural Development
- International Finance Corporation
- International Federation of Red Cross and Red Crescent Societies
- International Hydrographic Organization (pending member)
- International Labour Organization
- International Monetary Fund
- International Telecommunication Union
- Intelsat
- Interpol
- International Olympic Committee
- International Organization for Migration
- International Organization for Standardization
- International Telecommunication Union
- Latin American Economic System
- Non-Aligned Movement
- Organization of American States
- OPANAL
- Organisation for the Prohibition of Chemical Weapons
- United Nations
- UN Security Council (temporary)
- United Nations Conference on Trade and Development
- UNESCO
- United Nations Industrial Development Organization
- Universal Postal Union
- World Health Organization
- World Intellectual Property Organization
- World Meteorological Organization
- World Tourism Organization
- World Trade Organization

== See also ==
- List of diplomatic missions in Jamaica
- List of diplomatic missions of Jamaica
