= Kamina Johnson Smith =

Jamaican attorney and politician

Senator the Honourable Kamina Johnson Smith
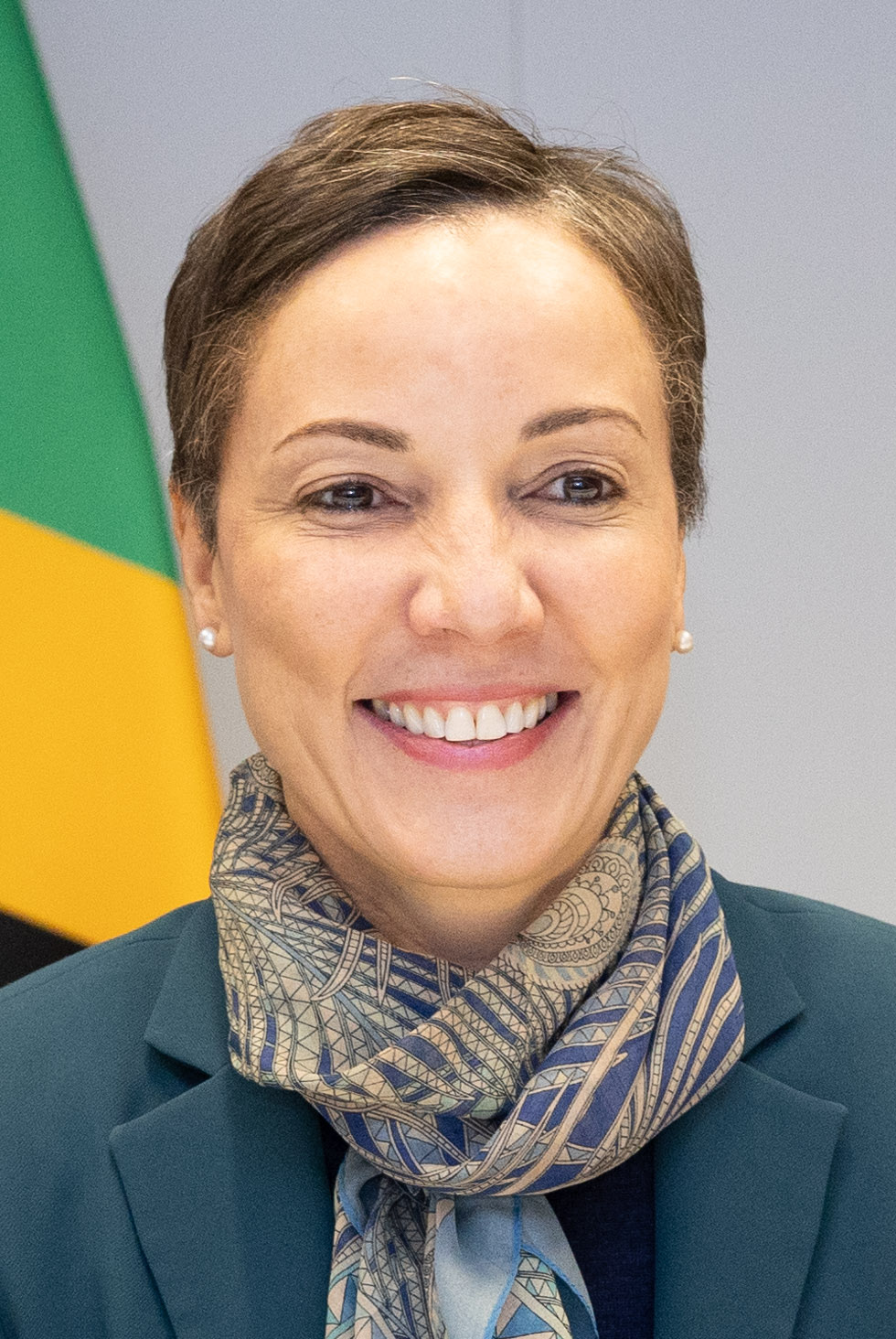
- Johnson Smith in 2024

Minister of Foreign Affairs and Foreign Trade
- Incumbent
- Assumed office 7 March 2016
- Prime Minister: Andrew Holness
- Preceded by: Arnold Joseph Nicholson

Member of the Senate of Jamaica
- Incumbent
- Assumed office December 2009

Personal details
- Born: St. Andrew, Jamaica
- Party: Jamaica Labour Party
- Relatives: Anthony Johnson (father)
- Education: University of the West Indies, Mona (BA); University of the West Indies, Cave Hill (LLB); London School of Economics (LLM)

Kamina Elizabeth Johnson Smith is a Jamaican attorney-at-law and Senator. Johnson Smith is Jamaica's first female Minister of Foreign Affairs and Foreign Trade. Since 2016, Johnson Smith has served concurrently as Minister of Foreign Affairs and Foreign Trade and Leader of Government Business in the Senate.

== Early life and education ==
Kamina Johnson Smith was born in Saint Andrew Parish, Jamaica. She graduated from the University of the West Indies with Bachelor of Arts in French and international relations and Bachelor of Laws degree and from the London School of Economics with a Master of Laws in commercial law. She graduated from Norman Manley Law School as valedictorian.

== Career ==
Smith was admitted to the Jamaica Bar in 1999. A law firm was opened by Smith in 2014.

She was appointed to the Senate in December 2009. She was made the whip for the opposition in 2012. In 2016, she was appointed as leader of Government Business in the Senate.

Smith was appointed as Minister of Foreign Affairs and Foreign Trade of Jamaica on 7 March 2016. She is the first woman to hold the position. CARIFORUM was chaired by Smith from 2016 to 2017, and she was appointed president of the Council of the International Seabed Authority in 2019.

During the 2020 election Smith was chair of the Jamaica Labour Party's manifesto committee.

Smith sought the position of Commonwealth Secretary-General in 2022, but lost in a 27 to 24 vote against incumbent Patricia Scotland.

== Works cited ==
=== News ===
- Bourke, Latika (25 June 2022). "Australian-backed candidate fails to topple Commonwealth boss Patricia Scotland". The Sydney Morning Herald. Archived from the original on 7 July 2025.

=== Web ===
- "Cabinet Minister Senator The Honourable Kamina Johnson Smith". Prime Minister of Jamaica. Archived from the original on 26 August 2017.
- "Profile for the: Minister of Foreign Affairs and Foreign Trade". Jamaica Information Service. Archived from the original on 27 May 2026.
