= Ministry of Foreign Affairs and Foreign Trade (Jamaica) =

Government ministry of Jamaica

Commonwealth of Jamaica Ministry of Foreign Affairs and Foreign Trade
- Coat of arms of Jamaica

Agency overview
- Formed: 1962
- Jurisdiction: Jamaica and its diplomatic missions worldwide
- Headquarters: 21 Dominica Drive, Kingston 5
- Agency executive: Kamina Johnson Smith, Minister of Foreign Affairs and Foreign Trade
- Website: mfaft.gov.jm

The Ministry of Foreign Affairs and Foreign Trade is the ministry responsible for handling Jamaica's external relations and foreign trade. The ministry's current director is Senator Kamina Johnson Smith.

The ministry's official mission statement notes that it "is responsible for the implementation of Jamaica's foreign policy, the management of Jamaica international relations and the promotion of its interests overseas."

== History ==
After achieving independence from the United Kingdom in August 1962, Jamaica immediately established its foreign ministry, then known as the Ministry of External Affairs. In 1976, the government changed the ministry's name to the Ministry of Foreign Affairs and eventually added "and Foreign Trade" sometime later to reflect the full scope of its mission.

== List of ministers ==
This is a list of ministers of foreign affairs and foreign trade of Jamaica:

- 1962–1967: Sir Alexander Bustamante
- 1967–1972: Hugh Shearer
- 1972–1975: Michael Manley
- 1975–1977: Dudley Thompson
- 1977–1980: P. J. Patterson
- 1980–1989: Hugh Shearer
- 1989–1993: David Coore
- 1993–1995: Paul Robertson
- 1995–2000: Seymour Mullings
- 2000–2001: Paul Robertson
- 2001–2006: Keith Desmond Knight
- 2006–2007: Anthony Hylton
- 2007–2012: Kenneth Baugh
- 2012–2016: Arnold Joseph Nicholson
- 2016–present: Kamina Johnson Smith

== See also ==
- Foreign relations of Jamaica
- Diplomatic missions of Jamaica
- Cabinet of Jamaica
- Prime Minister of Jamaica
