= Bustamante =

Bustamante is a toponymic surname originating in the town Bustamante which is part of the Cantabria region in northern Spain. Notable people with the surname include:

- Alexander Bustamante (1884–1977), Jamaican politician and labor leader
- Alyssa Bustamante (born 1994), American murderer
- Anastasio Bustamante (1780–1853), President of Mexico
- Antonio Sánchez de Bustamante y Sirven (1865–1951), Cuban jurist
- Bianca Bustamante (born 2005), Filipino racing driver
- Carlos Bustamante (biophysicist) (born 1951), Peruvian-American scientist, professor of biology, physics, and chemistry
- Carlos María Bustamante (1774–1848), Mexican statesman and historian
- Cruz Bustamante (born 1953), American politician from California
- David Bustamante (born 1982), Spanish singer
- Ernesto Bustamante (born 1950), Peruvian scientist, politician, and entrepreneur
- Francisco Bustamante (born 1963), Filipino pocket billiards player
- Francisco Bustamante (painter) (c. 1680–1737), Spanish painter
- Gladys Bustamante (1912–2009), Jamaican activist
- Hector Luis Bustamante (born 1972), Colombian actor
- Jean-Marc Bustamante (born 1952), French artist, sculptor, and photographer
- José Bustamante y Rivero (1894–1989), President of Peru
- José de Bustamante (1759–1825), Spanish naval officer, explorer, and politician
- José María Bustamante (1777–1861), Mexican composer
- Juby Bustamante (1938–2014), Spanish journalist
- Manuel Aguilar y Bustamante (1750–1819), Salvadoran ecclesiastic and revolutionary
- Manela Bustamante (1924–2005), Cuban-Puerto Rican actress
- Manuel Basilio Bustamante (1785–1863), Uruguan politician
- Mariano Bustamante (1831–1879), Peruvian war hero
- Martha Cecilia Bustamante, Colombian–French historian of science
- Mikel Bustamante (born 1986), Spanish actor
- Monika Bustamante (born 1980s), American voice actress
- Murilo Bustamante (born 1966), Brazilian martial arts champion
- Ric Bustamante (1923–?), Filipino actor
- Teodoro Sánchez de Bustamante (1778–1851), Argentine politician, lawyer and soldier

== Places ==
- Bustamante, Nuevo León, Mexico
- Bahía Bustamante, a village and municipality in the Escalante Department, southern Argentina

== Ships ==
- Spanish destroyer Bustamante, a Spanish Navy destroyer in commission from 1914 to 1931

== See also ==
- Bustamante Industrial Trade Union, Jamaican trade union
