= Jamaica Association of Local Government Officers =

Public sector trade union in Jamaica

JALGO
- Jamaica Association of Local Government Officers
- Founded: November 16, 1940
- Headquarters: Kingston
- Location: Jamaica
- Members: 5,000
- Key people: Helene Davis-Whyte, General Secretary
- Affiliations: Jamaica Confederation of Trade Unions

The Jamaica Association of Local Government Officers (JALGO) is a 5,000-member public sector trade union in Jamaica which represents workers in local and national government, governmental corporations, quasi-government bodies and other agencies created by statute. Its members are non-supervisory personnel and include fire-fighters with the Jamaica Fire Brigade, workers at the National Water Commission, non-nursing personnel in the health service, non-teachers in the schools, workers at the National Irrigation Commission and government employees in the 13 Parish Councils.

== History ==
JALGO was formed in 1940. After a series of labor uprisings, colonial British authorities passed a reform law in December 1938 legalizing trade unionism in Jamaica. The Bustamante Industrial Trade Union (BITU) and the Trade Unions Congress (TUC) both were formed after passage of the trade union law.

BITU and TUC quickly elevated the wages of some manual laborers to a point where they were at the same level or even higher than clerical workers in local government. When white-collar workers employed by the city of Kingston began demanding wage increases, the colonial government set up a one-man commission to make recommendations. The white-collar workers consulted with Alexander Bustamante, Noel Nethersole and Frank Hill—leaders of the nascent Jamaican labor movement—on what to do. Bustamante and the others recommended the formation of a trade union to empower the workers.

On November 16, 1940, Kingston city workers formed the Municipal Officers Association. Although Bustamante and others had counseled an industrial union, membership in the new organization was limited to white-collar workers. Government workers throughout Jamaica flocked to the new union, and parish branches sprung up nationwide. The first general meeting of the union was held in June 1941 and a constitution adopted. The Municipal Officers Association quickly won improved salaries and benefits. Government workers decided that a national organization was needed to coordinate the activities of the parish branches, and the Jamaica Association of Local Government Officers (JALGO) was formed a short while later.

In 1961, E. Lloyd Taylor was elected General Secretary of JALGO. Taylor went into government service in 1945 and immediately joined JALGO. He was elected president of the Kingston parish branch in 1955. Taylor fervently believed in industrial unionism, and quickly joined with other militant elements in the branch to push for expansions in the definition of membership. The JALGO executive council opposed the move, and threatened to dissolve the Kingston branch. But Taylor and his followers prevailed, and in 1961 they succeeded in amending the union constitution to allow weekly paid workers to become members. Taylor was elected General Secretary, but it was not until 1966 more far-reaching changes were made. But by 1970, JALGO membership was open to every government worker regardless of their category or status. Along with the changes in membership came a more liberal and activist outlook for JALGO.

In the 1970s, JALGO focused on building its membership, securing expanded worker rights, and improving benefits. Taylor was an active proponent of trade union unity, and he pushed JALGO to play a lead role in forming the Joint Trade Unions Research Development Centre (JTURDC) in 1980. Talks between Jamaica and the government of Norway had led to the establishment of JTURDC, which served four major unions: BITU, the National Workers' Union (NWU), the TUC, and JALGO. The JTURDC later evolved into the Jamaica Confederation of Trade Unions (JCTU).

But the union suffered significant setbacks in the 1980s. JALGO had nearly 15,000 members in 1980. The Edward Seaga administration restructured local government services between 1984 and 1986, with many local government functions assumed by the national government. More than 8,000 JALGO members at the local level lost their jobs, including a large number of elected leaders. In the midst of these membership losses, JALGO and other unions on the island were forced to call a general strike. As inflation soared to 30 percent, the government offered JALGO a 12 to 15 percent wage increase. JALGO, BITU and other unions representing 250,000 members (roughly 10 percent of the island's population) engaged in a four-day general strike to win higher wages. The strike ended in a stalemate, but significantly weakened the Seaga administration. Then in 1987 the national government proposed nationalizing fire-fighting departments nationwide. The "Fire Brigade Act" passed in October 1988, stripping fire-fighters and fire officers of the right to joint a union. Many members of the Fire Brigade refused to end their JALGO memberships, and in 1990 the act was amended to restore the right to join the union.

After 34 years leading the union, Taylor stepped down as General Secretary of JALGO in 1995. Helene Davis-Whyte was elected his successor.

== Recent activities ==
JALGO faced another threat to its existence in 2000. The Junior Doctors Association, which represented residents and interns in the Jamaican health system, had threatened to strike. The government obtained an injunction against the association. The association appealed, arguing that it was not a trade union as provided for under the law and subsequently could not be sued. In Junior Doctors Association and Attorney General for Jamaica, (Suit No. E127/2000, decided July 12, 2000), the Supreme Court of Civil Appeal ruled that the injunction was indeed void for the reasons set forth by the association. In retaliation, Prime Minister P. J. Patterson announced the government would no longer negotiate with "non-legal entities." Thousands of public workers represented by organizations other than formal trade unions lost their representation. JALGO was able to avoid the loss of representation because its members were either represented by registered trade unions at the local level, or because federal law specifically recognized JALGO as the collective bargaining agent.

JALGO has also struggled recently to maintain its members' wage and benefit gains. The government imposed a wage freeze on public sector unions in February 2004 as part of its effort to rein in inflation. But after prices surged 13 percent in last 10 months of 2004, BITU announced it was pulling out of the "Memorandum of Understanding" (MoU, the government's collective bargaining agreement with public-sector unions). JALGO General-Secretary Davis-Whyte refused to withdraw from the MoU, helping save the agreement and leading to improved relations with the government. In 2006, the Patterson administration announced it was ending a wage freeze implemented in the MoU. Davis-Whyte was named to a trade union body (which included representatives from the Jamaica Teachers' Association and Jamaica Civil Service Association) to negotiate the next MoU. But six months later, JALGO and two other public employee unions were forced to strike the National Water Commission to increase salaries (which averaged 28 percent below market).

== Structure ==
JALGO is governed by its members. The members are organized into parish branches. Members at the parish branch level elect officers of the parish branch as well as delegates, both of which then represent the parish branch on the JALGO national executive council. Members in each governmental agency and occupation also elect delegates to the executive council.

The executive council is JALGO's policy-making body. It debates and votes on policy, approves the budget, and engages in other activities which administer the union.

A General Meeting is held every two years. Members directly elect the officers of the union. There are six vice-presidents who represent the six geographical regions of the nation, and two officers: the General Secretary and the President. The General Secretary is the union's highest elected office, while the president serves as an aide to the General Secretary. The vice presidents coordinate the activities of the parish branches in their jurisdictions, while the General Secretary and President oversee the day-to-day operations of the union.

As of 2007, Stanley Thomas is the president and Helene Davis-Whyte is the General Secretary.

JALGO primarily engages in collective bargaining and represents the interests of its members in the workplace (largely through filing grievances and participating in workplace decision-making structures). The union also provides a number of member benefits, including emergency loans to members and competitive educational scholarships.

The union's headquarters are in Kingston. It is a member of the Jamaica Confederation of Trade Unions and Public Services International.
