= British West Indian labour unrest of 1934–1939 =

Disturbances in British Caribbean colonies

A series of workplace disturbances, strikes, and riots broke out across the British West Indies in the period between 1934 and 1939. These began as the Great Depression wore on and ceased on the eve of World War II. The unrest served to highlight inequalities of wealth, led the British government to attempt a solution to the problem, and in some cases spurred the development of indigenous party politics that would lead to self-government and independence in the postwar period.

== Chronology ==
Various starting points for the cycle of disturbances have been proposed: the February 1934 labour agitation in British Honduras (which ended in a riot in September) the May–July 1934 sugar estate disturbance on Trinidad (which broke out on several estates in the central sugar belt, involving over 15,000 Indo-Trinidadian labourers), and the January 1935 Saint Kitts sugar strike. In any event, after St Kitts (which turned into a general strike of agricultural labourers) came a March strike in Trinidad's oilfields and a hunger march to Port of Spain. In Jamaica labour protests broke out in May on the island's north coast. Rioting among banana workers in the town of Oracabessa was followed by a strike of dockworkers in Falmouth that ended in violence. In September and October there were riots on various sugar estates in British Guiana; there had been strikes the previous September on five sugar estates on the west coast of Demerara. In October rioting also took place on St Vincent in Kingstown and Camden Park.

The year ended with a November strike of coal workers in St Lucia. After a relatively tranquil year in 1936, there was widespread unrest in Trinidad that saw unprecedented cooperation between Indo-Trinidadian and Afro-Trinidadian labourers, in Barbados in June 1937, and Jamaica in May to June 1938. The 1937–38 disturbances were of greater magnitude than the 1934–35 ones, which had been more localized. In Trinidad, for example, the protest began in the oilfields but eventually spread to the sugar belt and the towns. In Barbados the disorder that started in Bridgetown spread to rural areas, leaving between 14 and 22 dead. In Jamaica most areas of the island experienced serious strikes and disturbances. At least two ending points have also been suggested: the Jamaican cane-cutters' strike of 1938 or the major February 1939 strike at the Plantation Leonora in British Guiana, which led to further disturbances.

In 1937, there were numerous deaths as strikes descended into riots, while the sugar workers' and Kingston labourers' strike in Jamaica in 1938 resulted in riots and 46 deaths. At least 429 were injured, with thousands detained and prosecuted.

Women played a crucial role at almost every level of the popular protests. As workers, many women were involved in the planning and execution of the strikes, and they were active in radical organizations such as the Universal Negro Improvement Association and African Communities League. The Caribbean unrest was not limited to British colonies: massive strikes took place in independent Cuba in 1930, 1933 and 1935, as well as a hunger march by sugar workers on French Martinique in February 1935.

== Causes ==
Each labour rebellion had its own particular circumstances, but a common pattern can be discerned: the underlying causes were economic. With the exception of the mineral-extractive industries – oil in Trinidad and bauxite in British Guiana – the British West Indian economies were largely dependent on a narrow range of agricultural exports. Thus, they were highly vulnerable to reduced demand or a serious downturn in Britain and Europe. The sugar industry, which remained the mainstay of the colonial economies, had long been in a critical state but had revived during World War I as warfare disrupted European sugar beet production. In the postwar years, sugar prices fell sharply as world supply exceeded effective demand. The British government's policy of subsidizing domestic sugar beet production further depressed prices. The prices of other agricultural staples, including cocoa, coconuts, limes and bananas, also slumped to unprofitable levels due to worldwide overproduction. In some cases agricultural commodities suffered from the effects of plant diseases and hurricane damage. The crisis in the colonial economy was exacerbated by the global economic Depression, which further reduced demand for British Caribbean exports in the 1930s.

The pervasive economic Depression in the colonies had far-reaching consequences for the working classes. Employers in some industries drastically reduced wages. Social conditions deteriorated as unemployment and underemployment increased (which an inadequate social welfare system could not address), factors that were worsened by sharply increased population growth, itself the result of a significant downward trend in the region's mortality rate as health conditions improved. The cost of living also went up: it was a sudden upsurge in 1937–1938 that led to strikes in Jamaica. Emigration outlets were closed, which created a frustrating sense of being shut in and of being denied opportunity and choice.

Other general causes were the longstanding grievances of the West Indian peasants against the plantation owners. Historically, the peasants occupied the least fertile lands and were bullied by the owners. They had problems with land title, poor technology, lack of finance and marketing assistance, and poor means of transporting produce from the farm to the market. These and other grievances stimulated peasant participation in the disturbances. Furthermore, there was a rapid growth of working-class consciousness. Labour unions had been well-organised in Guiana and Jamaica since the 1920s. The British Guiana Labour Union dated to 1919, and the Longshoremen Union had a chapter in Jamaica from the early years of the century.

In addition, there was a general increase in nationalist and pro-independence sentiments in the 1930s. The labour unions were organised as general political organisations or broad-based social movements. They campaigned for better wages and working conditions, the transformation of the colonial system and political independence for the colonies. Moreover, West Indians had rising expectations, as many had travelled abroad and experienced living conditions in Britain and the US. They wanted the same high standard of living at home, wished to be accorded respect as trained professionals and desired opportunities for upward mobility. Instead, they remained trapped in the system's political, economic, social, colour and racial hierarchies. Ideologies such as Marxism and Fabian socialism gained currency.

== Consequences ==
As a result of the disturbances, the British government created the Moyne Commission, headed by Lord Moyne, to investigate what had transpired. Its members visited all the British Caribbean territories between November 1938 and February 1939, looking at conditions in housing, agriculture, hospitals, asylums for the mentally ill, leper homes, prisons, factories, docks, schools, orphanages, land settlement, and political and constitutional matters. It heard formal evidence in 26 centres from 370 witnesses or groups of witnesses, and received and considered 789 memoranda of evidence. The investigation was regarded with great seriousness, as seen from the high level of public interest and the numbers, status and range of organisational affiliation of those giving evidence; both the latter and those who had been in active rebellion saw it as a channel for achieving reform. The Moyne Report pinpointed the outdated land-tenure structure and the remnants of the plantation system as the chief culprits in the economic crisis facing the West Indies, and recommended the federation of all the West Indian colonies as "an ideal to which policy should be directed", beginning with the federation of the Windward (Grenada, Saint Vincent, Saint Lucia, Dominica) and Leeward (Antigua, Saint Kitts-Nevis-Anguilla, Montserrat) Islands. However, it rejected the idea of immediate independence and the introduction of universal adult suffrage, both of which featured among the workers' demands.

The report was issued in 1939 but was not published in full until 1945, lest it provide a propaganda source for the Axis powers. Based on its recommendations, the Colonial Development and Welfare Act became law in July 1940, providing the framework for reform in welfare and development in the entire British Empire. It allowed for £5m to be spent yearly on colonial development and welfare for ten years and £500,000 annually for colonial research indefinitely. A Colonial Development and Welfare Department was established in 1940 and the appropriate staff assembled in the regional territories in 1941. Still, due to wartime exigencies, little was achieved in the region by 1945.

In Jamaica, the settlement of the 1938 unrest laid the foundations for that country's modern party system. Alexander Bustamante led a strike on the Frome Estate Sugar Plantation after a wage-and-hours dispute. The excitement generated there quickly spread to dockworkers and street cleaners, ultimately producing a general strike suppressed by British forces. Bustamante was jailed for seventeen months, becoming a labour martyr; his cousin Norman Manley helped settle the strike. Manley quickly became so popular that by September, he had organised the People's National Party with the support of the Trade Union Congress (later to become the National Workers' Union). Bustamante, once released, began to organise his own party, and in 1943, strongly backed by the Bustamante Industrial Trade Union (BITU), which he led, founded the Jamaica Labour Party. The two parties have remained dominant ever since. Other leaders identified with working class aspirations emerged, including Grantley Adams of Barbados, who served as legal counsel for some of those arrested in 1937; and Albert Gomes of Trinidad, who became a popular political speaker during this period and was elected to the Port of Spain City Council.

Strong trade unions continued to develop all around the Caribbean. These collected data on working conditions and wage levels, and became mass movements associated with political parties. Besides the BITU, the National Workers Union arose in Jamaica, the Labour Party of St. Kitts and the St. Kitts-Nevis Trades and Labour Union, and unions and parties in Antigua. All were of the same general view regarding wages and salaries for workers.
