= Trade Union Congress (Jamaica) =

Jamaican trade union

The Trade Union Congress is a general trade union in Jamaica. Initially organised as a trade union council to be the labour wing of the People's National Party (PNP) in 1943, the organisation split in 1952 with the formation of the National Workers Union (which maintained alignment with the PNP). The TUC was a founding member of the Jamaica Confederation of Trade Unions.

== Origins ==
The Trade Union Congress came into existence as a result of shifts in politics in Jamaica in the 1940s and early 1950s. In 1939, Norman Manley founded the Trade Union Advisory Council, a committee with 12 members, including three from the Bustamante Industrial Trade Union (BITU). However, Alexander Bustamante withdrew his union from the council after its first meeting. The other unions continued to attend. In 1943, Manley reorganised the council as the Trade Union Council, which grouped 16 small unions together in alignment to the PNP, in contrast to BITU which was responsible for the foundation of the Jamaica Labour Party in that year. In 1946 the TUC was reorganised as the Trade Union Congress and in 1948 14 of the member unions were merged into a single union under the same name, with two unions remaining separate but affiliated.

Around 1950, T. A. Kelley led a split which formed the National Labour Congress. This had 1,000 members a year later, but disintegrated in 1952 following disagreements on whether to merge into another new split from the TUC, the National Workers' Union. In 1953, there was another split, forming the Jamaica Federation of Trade Unions, affiliated to the World Federation of Trade Unions. This group founded the Sugar and Agricultural Workers' Union, which was briefly influential, but in 1959, both union and federation dissolved.
