= Edward Thomas Nevin =

Welsh/British economist (1925–1992)

- Born: 5 February 1925; Pembroke Dock, Wales
- Died: 11 September 1992 (aged 67); Swansea, Wales

Academic background
- Education: University College of Wales, Aberystwyth; Corpus Christi College, Cambridge

Academic work
- Discipline: Economics
- Institutions: University College of Wales, Aberystwyth; University College of Swansea

Edward Thomas Nevin (5 February 1925 – 11 September 1992) was a Welsh/British economist who served as Professor of Economics at the University College of Wales, Aberystwyth, between 1963 and 1968, and at the University College of Swansea from 1968 to 1992.

== Early life and education ==
Nevin left school at age sixteen in 1941 and began working with the Ministry of Aircraft Production in Harrogate. In 1943, he joined the Corps of Royal Electrical and Mechanical Engineers (REME). After his demobilisation in October 1946, he enrolled—under a post-war programme funding ex-servicemen's higher education—at the University College of Wales, Aberystwyth, to read Law and Economics, graduating with first-class honours in 1949.

== Career ==
In 1950, Nevin secured a Houblon-Norman Fellowship at the University of Cambridge to undertake doctoral research on British monetary policy during the 1930s. This cumulated in the 1955 publication The Mechanism of Cheap Money, which demonstrated that the low interest rates that followed the Wall Street Crash of 1929, the collapse of the Gold Standard in 1931, and the War Loan Conversion of 1932 had stimulated economic recovery in Britain during the 1930s.

Nevin returned to Aberystwyth as a lecturer in economics, but in 1957 he was appointed Head of External Finance in the Jamaican Ministry of Finance as part of a team under the island's Finance Minister, the Hon Noel Newton Nethersole. This period resulted in the publication of Capital Funds in Underdeveloped Countries, which Nevin dedicated to Nethersole and in which he outlined a blueprint for the role a central bank should play in an emerging economy.

In 1959, following Nethersole's death at age fifty-five, Nevin returned to Aberystwyth but in 1961 he joined the newly created Irish Economic Research Institute (ERI) in Dublin, where he published fifteen papers on different aspects of the Irish economy, including seven of the first seventeen ERI Research Papers. Many of these examined the potential implications of membership in the European Economic Community for Ireland's economy, setting out the key considerations in "Ireland and the Common Market: Some Basic Issues".

In 1963 Nevin was appointed Professor of Economics at Aberystwyth, and in 1968 he became Head of the Economics Department at University College Swansea giving an inaugural lecture titled "Economics: Waiting for Godot" on 25 February 1969 . During the 1970s and 1980s he acted as adviser to the Police Federation in its pay negotiations with the government; which led to the publication of The Pay of the Policeman, in which Nevin applied econometric techniques to estimate the level of pay required to attract and retain a specified number of officers.

Between the early 1950s and 1990, Nevin published around fifty monographs, academic papers and press articles on different aspects of the Welsh economy. In 1966, he produced the first set of input-output accounts for Wales with the assistance of Alan Roe and Jeff Round. In his obituary in the Independent, Aberystwyth colleague Professor George Clayton observed that Nevin

was a man of many exceptional talents who made a distinctive contribution in so many spheres, but I am sure that he would most like to be remembered as a university teacher who conceived of his task as being ‘to open up the mind, to correct it, to refine it, to enable it to know.

== Legacy ==
On 5 February 2025, the centenary of Nevin's birth, an event was held at Swansea University to honour him., This featured four presentations by Michael Nevin on "Money in War and Peace and the Foundation of the Bank of Jamaica, 1930–1960", Alan Roe on "Economics at Aberystwyth during the 1960s", Jeff Round on "The First Input–Output Model of the Welsh Economy", and David Blackaby on "Edward Nevin in Swansea during the 1970s and 1980s".

== Publications ==
- Edward Nevin, The Market in Gilt-Edged Securities, September 1939-December 1949, A dissertation submitted for the degree of Master of Arts of the University of Wales, Aberystwyth, 1950
- Edward Nevin, The Problem of the National Debt, Cardiff, University of Wales Press, 1954
- Edward Nevin (Ed), The Social Accounts of the Welsh Economy 1948-1952, Cardiff, University of Wales Press, Welsh Economic Studies No 1, 1954
- Edward Nevin, The mechanism of cheap money : a study of British monetary policy, 1931-1939, Cardiff, University of Wales Press, 1955
- Edward Nevin (Ed), The Social Accounts of the Welsh Economy 1948-1956, Cardiff, University of Wales Press, Welsh Economic Studies No 2, 1957
- Edward Nevin, Textbook of economic analysis, London, Macmillan, 1st edition 1958, 2nd edition 1963, 3rd edition 1967, 4th edition 1976; Irish edition 1965
- Edward Nevin, Capital Funds in Underdeveloped Countries: The Role of Financial Institutions, London, Macmillan & Co, 1963
- Edward Nevin, The Growth of the Welsh Economy, Denbigh, Transactions of the Honourable Society of Cymmrodorion, 1966
- Edward Nevin, A.R. Roe, and J.I. Round, The Structure of the Welsh Economy, Cardiff, University of Wales Press, 1966, Welsh Economic Studies No 4
- Edward Nevin, Waiting for Godot, inaugural lecture at the University College of Swansea, 1969
- Edward Nevin and E.W. Davis, The London Clearing Banks, London, Elek Books, 1970
- Edward Nevin, Introduction to Microeconomics, London, Croom Helm, 1973
- Edward Nevin, The Pay of the Policeman, Police Federation of England and Wales, London, 1975
- Edward Nevin, The Economics of Europe, London, Macmillan, 1990
