= Jamaica Civil Service Association =

- Established: May 6, 1919; 107 years ago
- Location: 10 Caledonia Avenue, Cross Roads, Kingston 5, Jamaica
- Coordinates: 17.9942°N 76.7869°W
- Website: www.jacisera.org

The Jamaica Civil Service Association is an association representing the civil servants of Jamaica.

== History ==
Approval was given by the government of the day to the Public Officers Memorial Committee for the formation of the Jamaica Civil Service Association (JCSA) on 6 May 1919.

In 1912, due to poor working conditions and low salaries in the public service in Jamaica, public officers petitioned the government to get improvements in these areas for the various grades of officers in the service. Although the colonial government admitted that the public officer's claim was justified, because of the austerity that World War I which was raging in Europe brought on the government, the claims could not be met. As such public officers were unable to seriously press their claims for improvements until 1918 when the First World War had ended and the country's economic conditions became less acute.

With the war over and normality returning, a meeting of public officers was called and it was decided that the officers would make further representation to the government for increases. The responsibility of preparing the petition to the government was given to a committee which the officers formed, called the Public Officers Memorial Committee. The members of this committee were drawn from all departments in the central government. This committee was also mandated to report to the officers on the advisability of forming an association.

On the advice of this committee the JCSA was formed on 6 May 1919, with the government's approval. The island's Colonial Secretary at the tine, Hon. Colonel H. Bryan was made the Honorary President of the Association. The regular meetings of the Association were chaired by the First Vice President Mr. Walter M. Frazer who was a public officer.

The work of the Memorial Committee was merged into the work of the association and the managing committees worked to secure the increases and improvements. Through their efforts increases were given.

Being closely linked with the government (this being a product of having the Colonial Secretary as the Honorary President) the Association focused on primarily using petitions and persuasion rather than direct confrontation to secure improvements in the service. This method proved successful initially and the Association was able to secure the regrading of public officers, receipts of grant-in-aid and bonuses and secured the admission of women to the permanent service. The association also gained equal representation with government on a number of important committees which had been set up to consider reforms to the service.

The JCSA agitated for the formation of the Whitely Councils to deal with grievances and disputes. These Whitely Councils were later replaced by the Staff Relations Council.

Realizing that simply petitioning or advocating for improvements from the government would not be enough to bring about significant improvements in the living standards of its members, the association promoted the development of cooperative activities among its members to help secure these improvements. In 1939 the Jamaica Civil Service Thrift Society Ltd. was formed to render financial assistance to the association's members. In 1956 the Jamaica Civil Service Housing Company Ltd. was established to assist the members in acquiring their own homes.

During the 1950s the JCSA was able to lease and buy land which would go on to play an important role in the development of the Association and the services that they offer. In 1955 the Association was able to acquire land at Tarrant Pen under lease from the government. This land was used to establish a club and complex which was built in 1966. This complex now goes under the name JACISERA (an acronym for Jamaica Civil Service Association) Park and is the hub of all sporting activities, social activities and mass meetings of the Association.

During the 1950s the association also acquired land at 10 Caledonia Avenue in Kingston and constructed an office building which was opened in 1976. This building houses the association's secretariat, the Jamaica Civil Service Mutual Thrift Society, the JCSA Ltd, the JCS Housing Company Ltd., and the offices of the National Environment and Planning Agency (NEPA).

Additionally the association was also able to acquire twenty acres of land in each parish for housing civil servants through its contractual agreements with the government. The association through its housing company was responsible for the development of Blue Castle Housing Project in 1958; this project provided 47 houses for civil servants and the Union Estate Housing Project in 2009 which provided 767 houses for public servants. The JCSA members received 40% percent of the total units which represents 308 units.

Despite their initial close relationships with the government, following the country's independence, the association found it increasingly difficulty to secure the improvements that its members desired through petitions and advocacy. As a result, the association and its members had become much more militant and have begun to operate more like a traditional union. Strikes which were once unheard of among civil servants have now become a feature of the association when the need arose.

In 2006 at the JCSA's 88th Annual General Meeting (AGM) Business Session a constitutional change by a resolution was passed indicating that the leadership of the organisation should take steps to introduce amendment to the organization structure to bring into being the office of the General Secretary. It was stated that the position should be full-time and in January 2011, Mrs. Chelsie Shellie-Vernon- Senior Director of Conciliation at the Ministry of Labour and Social Security was appointed the association's first General Secretary.

The JCSA is enshrined in the Constitution of Jamaica as the body to represent public servants and is the only union so named in the Constitution. As a result, public servants are not subject to representation rights as prescribed under the LRIDA regulations of 1975.

== Structure ==
The association is governed by its Officers and General Council.

=== Officers ===
The officers of the association are President, First Vice President, Second Vice President, Third Vice President, Honorary Treasurer and Honorary Secretary. However, at the JCSA's 88th Annual General Meeting (AGM) Business Session as a result of deliberation by the members a decision was taken that the leadership of the organisation should take steps to introduce amendment to the organization structure to bring into being the office of the General Secretary. It was decided that the position should be full-time and in January 2011 the association appointed its first General Secretary.

==== Founding officers ====
- Mr. H. Bryan, President
- Mr. Walter Fraser, 1st Vice President
- R.H. Fletcher, 2nd Vice President
- F. P. Bond, Honorary Secretary

==== Current officers ====
- Mr. O’Neil W. Grant, MBA, President
- Mrs. Techa Clarke Griffiths, 1st Vice President
- Mr. Kelvin Thomas, 2nd Vice President
- Mr. Clarence Frater, 3rd Vice President
- Mrs. Melani Mullings-Arnold, Honorary Treasurer

=== General Council ===
The General Council is the highest decision making body outside the association's Annual General Meeting. These council members are elected by their constituents in the various ministries, departments and executive agencies on a yearly basis to represent its members; this council meets quarterly.

The Officers and General Council Members have the responsibility to elect ten other members and also the members of the National Staff Relations Council (NSRC) along with the Immediate Past President to form the Executive Committee and this process is conducted at the Association's first General Council Meeting after the Annual General Meeting. The role of the NSRC is to provide special expertise and act as special advisors to the Officers, Executive and General Council.

=== Executive committee ===
The Executive Committee monthly and is responsible for the operation of the organisation. The committee responds to issues of political, social or economic nature. However, the day-to-day management of the association is the responsibility of General Secretary and the Secretariat Staff.

=== Committees ===
Along with the General Secretary and the staff of the association the activities of the association are also carried out by various committees. Each committee has a chairman that is appointed by the General Council at the association's annual retreat. Below are the names of the current committees:

- Human Resource Development (HRD)
- Jacisera Management
- Young Workers
- Claims Development
- Women's Action
- Constitution and Policy
- National Staff Relations
- Members Benefit and Feasibility
- Sports
- Public Education

== Benefits ==
Apart from representing its members, some of the other benefits that the organisation has secured over the years are as follows:

- 20 acres of land in each parish
- Development of housing solutions
- Loan scheme for motor vehicle insurance
- The celebration of civil service week in the third week of November each year
- Consumer discounts at popular stores
- Loans for the purchase of computers
- Education grant
- Transportation for workers
- Computer loan
- Long service award for civil servants - 25 year and over
- The payment of pension based on the salary at retirement.
- Training and workshops to educate and inform workers
- Health insurance (Sagicor)
- Saturday, Sunday and Holiday should cease to be computed in the calculation of vacation leave
- Reduction of work week from 5 ½ days to 5 days
- Conversation on non-pensionable post to pensionable
- Tuition refund
- Tertiary Education Assistance Programme
- MoU between JCSA and MIND for the Development and Delivery of training in Industrial Relations on behalf of the Jamaica Civil Service Association
- EMed Jamaica Ltd

== Affiliated organisations ==
- Jamaica Confederation of Trade Unions
- Caribbean Public Service Association (CPSA)
- Public Service International (PSI)
