= Noel Newton Nethersole =

Jamaican politician and cricketer

- Portrait of Nethersole as it appeared on the Jamaican $20 note from 1976 to 2000

Minister of Finance and the Public Service
- In office February 1955 – May 1959
- Preceded by: Donald Sangster
- Succeeded by: Vernon Arnett

Vice President of People’s National Party
- In office 1939–1952
- President: Norman Manley

Personal details
- Born: Noel Newton Nethersole; 2 November 1903 Kingston, Jamaica
- Died: 17 March 1959 (aged 55) Kingston, Jamaica
- Party: People's National Party
- Cricket career

Personal information
- Nickname: Crab
- Batting: Left-handed
- Bowling: Medium pace (arm unknown)

Domestic team information
- Years: Team
- 1926–27 to 1938: Jamaica

Career statistics
Competition	First-class
Matches	16
Runs scored	429
Batting average	22.57
100s/50s	0/1
Top score	71
Balls bowled	1454
Wickets	9
Bowling average	76.88
5 wickets in innings	0
10 wickets in match	0
Best bowling	1/7
Catches/stumpings	6/0
- Source: Cricket Archive, 29 August 2014

Noel Newton "Crab" Nethersole (2 November 1903 – 17 March 1959) was a Jamaican Rhodes Scholar, cricketer and administrator, lawyer, politician, economist, and Jamaica's Minister of Finance from 1955 to 1959.

== Early life and education ==
Noel Nethersole was born in Kingston, Jamaica, in 1903, the eighth of 10 children of John Mapletoft Nethersole CBE, who was Administrator General and Trustee in Bankruptcy of Jamaica. According to Michael Manley, Noel "came from a near-white middle-class family". He was educated at Jamaica College, and was Jamaica's Rhodes Scholar for 1923, studying at Lincoln College, Oxford. He returned to Jamaica in 1926 to practise law as a solicitor.

== Cricket career ==
Nethersole did not play cricket for the university team during his time at Oxford, preferring to concentrate on his studies, but he played five Minor Counties Championship matches for Oxfordshire in the 1926 season, batting in the middle order and opening the bowling. Oxfordshire finished second.

Nethersole made his first-class debut for Jamaica in 1926–27, opening the bowling and batting in the lower order in a match against L.H. Tennyson's XI. His first wicket was that of Percy Fender. In 1927–28 he was one of the players invited to Barbados to play a series of trial matches to help the West Indies selectors choose the team to make West Indies' first Test tour of England in 1928. His performances were moderate, and he was not chosen to tour. Later in the season he made his highest first-class score, 71, batting at number eight in Jamaica's victory over L.H. Tennyson's XI. He captained Jamaica in all eight of their first-class matches from 1931–32 to 1938, for two wins, one loss and five draws.

Nethersole was a member of the West Indies Cricket Board of Control from 1939 to 1955, also serving during this period as the Jamaican team's manager and a West Indian selector. He "wage[d] a single-handed battle" for the appointment of George Headley as West Indies captain for the series against England in 1947–48; until then no non-white player had captained the Test side. Headley captained West Indies in the First Test of the series.

== Political career ==
Nethersole helped found the People's National Party (PNP) in 1938 and served as its vice-president from 1938 until his death in 1959. Norman Manley was president. During World War II he was prominent in the Jamaican trade union movement, and made a reputation as a conciliator.

He stood unsuccessfully for the PNP in the 1944 Jamaican national election, but succeeded at the next election in 1949 and entered parliament as a member of the opposition for the constituency of Central St Andrew. In the early 1950s he chaired the PNP committee whose determinations led to the expulsion of extreme leftist members of the party. He became the first president of the National Workers Union, which was a more moderate successor to the Trade Union Council. In the 1955 elections the PNP won office. As party deputy to Norman Manley, the new First Minister, Nethersole became Second Minister and took the post of Finance Minister.

Nethersole was determined to modernise Jamaica's financial institutions to give the country economic independence, in preparation for its political independence, which came in 1962. He played an important part in ensuring that when Jamaica became the world's largest producer of bauxite in 1957, the proceeds helped in Jamaica's development. He spent two years on negotiations to raise a substantial loan on the New York City money market, he laid the foundations for a central bank, and founded the Development Finance Corporation.

== Death and legacy ==
Nethersole's wife Elsie died of cancer in January 1958. Nethersole underwent eye surgery in early 1959, and died suddenly of a heart attack on 17 March.

The day after Nethersole died, on its front page the Kingston Gleaner said he had been "wholly responsible for the ideas behind the work of transforming Jamaica's financial institutions from the pattern of Crown Colony administration into the modern machinery of a self-governing nation which it is now becoming".

The Bank of Jamaica regards Nethersole as the "father" of the Bank. His statue stands outside the front of the Bank building, which is in Nethersole Place, Kingston. His portrait appeared on the Jamaican $20 note between 1976 and 2000.

His step-daughter, Elsie's daughter, was Tessa Prendergast.
