= Juby =

Juby may refer to:

== Surname ==
- Kerry Juby (1948–2003), English radio DJ
- Susan Juby (born 1969), Canadian writer

== Given name or nickname ==
- Juby Bustamante (1938–2014), Spanish journalist
- Juby Ninan, Indian actor

== Place name ==
- Cape Juby, a cape in southern Morocco
- Cape Juby Strip, a buffer zone between Morocco and Western Sahara
