= Gladys Bustamante =

Jamaican workers' and women's rights activist

The Most Honourable Lady Bustamante OJ

Spouse of the Prime Minister of Jamaica
- In office 7 September 1962 – 23 February 1967
- Succeeded by: Vacant

Personal details
- Born: Gladys Maud Longbridge; 8 March 1912 Parson Reid, Westmoreland Parish, Colony of Jamaica, British Empire
- Died: 25 July 2009 (aged 97) Kingston, Jamaica
- Party: Jamaica Labour Party
- Spouse: Sir Alexander Bustamante (m. 1962)
- Education: Tutorial Secondary and Commercial College
- Occupation: Activist, trade unionist, secretary

Gladys Maud, Lady Bustamante OJ (née Longbridge; 8 March 1912 – 25 July 2009) was a Jamaican workers' and women's rights activist and wife of Sir Alexander Bustamante, Jamaica's first Prime Minister. She was a prominent member of the Jamaican trade union movement, and was affectionately known as "Lady B.".

She has been called the "Mother of the Nation" due to her relationship with many of Jamaica's founders. Jamaican Prime Minister Bruce Golding has called Bustamante "an icon of political struggles" in Jamaica's march towards independence.

== Early life ==
She was born out of wedlock as Gladys Maud Longbridge on 8 March 1912 in Westmoreland Parish, Jamaica, to Frank Longbridge, a farmer, and Rebecca Blackwood, a housewife. In her memoir, The Memoirs of Lady Bustamante, she described her birth as a "welcome baby", writing "Being born out of wedlock was not a major issue in rural Jamaica then." She was raised by her grandparents in rural Jamaica following her mother's move to Cuba when she was 3 years old. Longbridge enrolled in Ashton Primary School.

Her aunt moved with the girl to Kingston, where they lived in the city's Jones Town neighborhood. Longbridge enrolled at the Tutorial Secondary and Commercial College, a private secondary school, where she studied to be a secretary.

== Career ==
Longbridge returned to her native Westmoreland in the 1930s, but was unable to find employment during the Great Depression. She moved back to Kingston in 1934.

Upon her return to Kingston, she began working as a cashier at a restaurant called Arlington House, which had become an important meeting place for members of the Jamaican colonial legislative assembly from rural areas of the island. While working there, she met Alexander Bustamante, a businessman and politician, whom she later married. He pronounced her name "Glad Ice" and called her "Miss G" at the time.

On 9 March 1936, Longbridge at age 24 started working for Bustamante as his personal secretary. He later founded the Bustamante Industrial Trade Union (BITU). Bustamante and Longbridge formed a long personal and professional relationship that would last for decades. She served as his secretary through his years as a trade unionist and as a politician, until he became Prime Minister of Jamaica in 1962. That year they married.

Longbridge became active in the Jamaican trade union movement and was considered a prominent member since 1938. She travelled extensively with Bustamante throughout Jamaica to deal with the concerns of the islands' workers. Longbridge became the treasurer and day-to-day decision maker for the Bustamante Industrial Trade Union (BITU) from the time of the union's foundation. As the Bustamante Industrial Trade Union was the largest organization in Jamaica at the time, Longbridge was arguably the most influential woman in Jamaica.

Bustamante later described the role of women in the Jamaican trade union movement in her memoir, "We women were the mainstay of the union's organisation, though we could hardly have functioned without the brave men who toiled day and night, facing all sorts of criticism and opposition as they tried to help the workers."

She also played a prominent role in the founding of the Jamaica Labour Party by Alexander Bustamante in July 1943.

In 1951, Longbridge agreed to run for political office in Eastern Westmoreland. She lost the election, which pleased her as she had reluctantly agreed to seek elected office. At the time, the Jamaica Gleaner newspaper described her as "the happiest loser" of the election.

Jamaican political and union life during the late colonial and post-independence eras centered largely on the rivalry between Bustamante and Norman Manley. While the two men, who were cousins and rivals for political power, often feuded in public, relations between Gladys Bustamante and Manley's wife, Edna Manley, were much more cordial.

== Marriage ==
Gladys Longbridge married Sir Alexander Bustamante on 7 September 1962, shortly after Jamaica achieved independence from the United Kingdom in August 1962. She was 28 years younger than he. Bustamante remained the first Prime Minister of Jamaica until his resignation in 1967 due to ill health. He had been effectively incapacitated for the last two years of his premiership due to illness. Gladys, Lady Bustamante, cared for her husband at their home, which was called Bellencita, for the remainder of his life. Sir Alexander Bustamante died on 6 August 1977. Bustamante described herself as "paralysed with grief" following her husband's death. She coped with her husband's death by becoming deeply involved with Jamaican charitable causes.

Bustamante became a patron of the Bustamante Hospital for Children in Kingston, named for her husband. Much of her work focused on the plight of poor, working-class Jamaicans and their children. She worked to improve the standard of living for workers in Jamaica's shipping ports and sugarcane communities. She also worked to improve the lives of impoverished children and their families.

When they first met in the 1930s, Gladys Bustamante attended the Moravian Church of the Redeemer. She later converted to Roman Catholicism, her husband's religion.

== Recognition ==
Gladys Bustamante received a number of domestic and international awards for her work. She was awarded the Order of Jamaica in 1982. The government of Venezuela bestowed Mrs. Bustamante with the Orchid Award in 1979 in recognition of her husband's career. The Jamaican government further awarded Bustamante the Plaque for Outstanding Public Service to Jamaica in 1986 to mark the end of the United Nations Decade for Women (1976–1986).

The Kingston and St. Andrew Corporation (KSAC) awarded Gladys Bustamante the Key to the city of Kingston on 16 October 2006, which was declared to be Lady Bustamante Day.

== Later life ==
In 2009, Prime Minister Bruce Golding and the leadership of the Bustamante Industrial Trade Union (BITU) celebrated Bustamante's 97th birthday at her residence in Irish Town, Saint Andrew Parish, Jamaica.

Bustamante continued to hold the title of honorary treasurer of the Bustamante Industrial Trade Union at the time of her death in 2009. She was also a trustee and executive member of the Jamaica Labour Party (JLP) that her husband had founded.

== Death ==
Gladys Bustamante had been ill for several years and had been confined to her Irish Town home for the last two years of her life. Her condition suddenly worsened around 10:00 am on 25 July 2009. She was rushed to the hospital by her caregivers. However, Bustamante died at approximately 4:40 pm on 25 July 2009, at the Tony Thwaites Wing of the University Hospital of the West Indies in Kingston, Jamaica. She was 97 years old. Bustamante had no children.

Bustamante lay in state at both the BITU headquarters and the Jamaica Labour Party headquarters on 4 August 2009. She was moved to the National Indoor Sports Centre for viewing on 7 August 2009.

Gladys Bustamante was interred alongside her husband, Prime Minister Alexander Bustamante, at the National Heroes Park in Kingston, Jamaica.
