= National Heroes Park =

Park in Kingston, Jamaica

- Interactive map of National Heroes Park
- Location: Kingston, Jamaica
- Coordinates: 17.9825497°N 76.7887259°W
- Designer: Jamaican government
- Opening date: 1962; 64 years ago
- Website: Official website

National Heroes Park (formerly King George VI Memorial Park) is a botanical garden in Kingston, Jamaica. The largest open space in Kingston at 20 hectares (50 acres) in size, National Heroes Park features numerous monuments; it is the burial site of many of Jamaica's national heroes, prime ministers and cultural leaders. The neighborhood around the park is also known as National Heroes Park.

== History ==
Founded in 1783, the park was originally a race track called Kingston Race Course, which featured a one-mile track used for horse races, with a typical purse of 100 pounds sterling. In 1905, a new track was constructed at Knutsford Park, and the old track was later renamed King George VI Memorial Park, in honor of King George VI of the United Kingdom, and converted into a public park. After Jamaica gained independence in 1962, the park's name was changed again to the name it currently bears.

=== Monuments ===
The Jamaica War Memorial, a cenotaph honoring the Jamaicans killed in combat during World War I and World War II, is a prominent feature of the park. The memorial, which was constructed in 1922, was initially located on Church Street in downtown Kingston, but in 1953 it was moved to its present location. It is topped by a cross weighing one and a half tons.

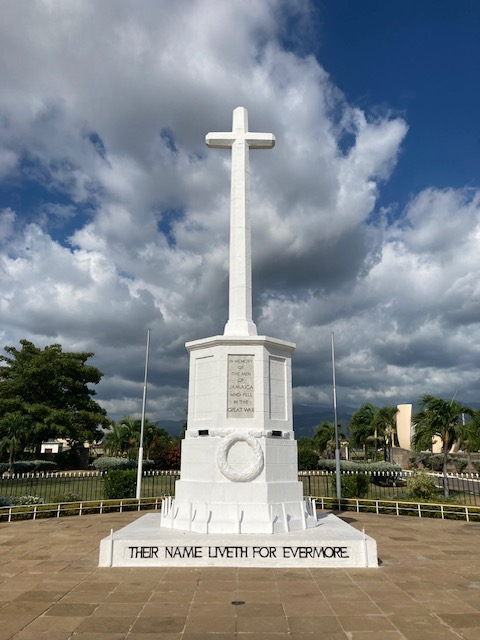
The Jamaica War Memorial at National Heroes Park

One of the park's first original monuments was constructed to house the remains of Marcus Garvey. Garvey died on 10 June 1940 in London, but transporting the remains from England was unfeasible at that time due to World War II. As a result, his body was buried in England until 1964, when the government of Jamaica paid to have it transported to the park for a ceremony honoring Garvey as a national hero. Garvey's monument consists of a tomb at the center of a raised platform in the shape of a black star, a symbol often used by Garvey. Behind it, a peaked and angled wall houses a bust of Garvey, which had been added to the park in 1956 and relocated after the construction of the monument. The monument was designed by G. C. Hodges, while the bust was the work of Alvin T. Marriot.

After Donald Sangster died in 1967, Mostyn F. Campbell designed a monument in his honor. The monument consists of an opposed pair of curved members, turning inward and wider at the top than at the novel base. The expansion of the members symbolizes Sangster's development from humble origins, while their separation is meant to suggest the unfinished nature of his life's work.

Another monument was constructed to honor Norman Manley. Designed by H. D. Repole, it was dedicated on 16 September 1972. The monument contains twelve pillars, arranged in two concentric circles, with the inner pillars taller than the outer ones. Each inner pillar is connected to its corresponding outer pillar by a horizontal member, and the inner pillars are also connected partway up by a ring. Manley's tomb is located at the center, topped by a six-pointed star. Each pair of pillars represents an aspect of Manley's life, and Repole's original design called for plaques describing these aspects to be affixed to each pillar assemblage. This plan was not completed, however, due to financial constraints. Instead, sculptures of two human figures were incorporated into the design in 1974. Designed by Christopher Gonzalez, these sculptures depict a male and a female, which are meant to symbolize the birth of a unified nation.

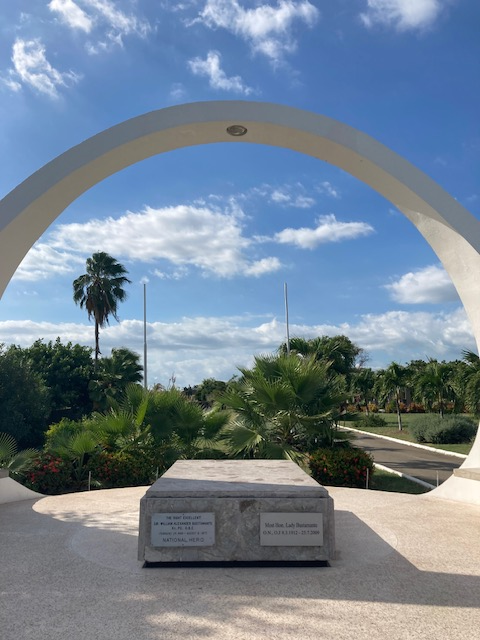
Monument to Sir Alexander Bustamante

Sir Alexander Bustamante is honored with a memorial completed in October 1979. Designer Errol Alberga created an arch, narrow at the top and widening toward the base, which stands above Bustamante's tomb, finished with marble from the region. Seats are incorporated into the base of the arch, which spans a gap of thirty feet.

Two monuments to historical figures were dedicated on 14 October 1999. The first of these honors Nanny of the Maroons, a female warrior of Asante descent who waged a guerrilla campaign against the British during the First Maroon War. Nanny's monument reproduces the sound of the abeng, a traditional instrument used by the fighters. The second is dedicated to Samuel Sharpe, the leader of the Christmas Uprising (a.k.a. the Baptist War), a slave revolt that took place in 1831. Sharp's monument is shaped like a Greek cross, to honor his Baptist faith, and its corners are left open as a representation of freedom. Both of these monuments were designed by Compass Workshop Limited.

A monument to Michael Manley was dedicated on 15 March 2002. Designed by Mark and Susan Taylor, the monument resembles a graph of exponential growth when viewed from the side. Its surface is covered with slabs of black Jamaican marble, some of which are engraved with quotes by Manley on the subject of equality.

A bust of General Antonio Maceo was added as a donation from the people of Cuba, in recognition of Jamaica having offered him asylum.

The park is also the burial site for 140 elderly women killed in a fire at the Myers Ward of the Eventide Home for the Aged in 1980. A monument marks the mass grave containing the women's remains.

== Administration ==
=== Administration ===
National Heroes Park is currently maintained by the Parks Division of Jamaica's National Solid Waste Management Authority. Security is provided by a formal honor guard from the Jamaica Defence Force, with a Changing of the Guard taking place every hour. Jamaica's Ministry of Local Government, Community Development and Sport is responsible for the renovations currently taking place at the park.

== Burial sites ==
The remains of the following notable people are interred at National Heroes Park:

- Toots Hibbert
- Dennis Brown
- Sir Alexander Bustamante
- Marcus Garvey
- Michael Manley
- Norman Manley
- Nanny of the Maroons
- George William Gordon
- Edna Manley
- Donald Sangster
- Hugh Shearer
- Ranny Williams
- Paul Bogle
- Samuel Sharpe
- Lady Bustamante
- Herb McKenley
- Louise Bennett-Coverley and Eric Winston Coverley
- Mallica "Kapo" Reynolds
- Howard and Ivy Cooke
- Edward Seaga
- Clement ‘Sir Coxsone’ Dodd

== Culture venue ==
The National Heroes Park was the venue of the Smile Jamaica Concert on 5 December 1976, performed by reggae superstars Bob Marley & The Wailers. The second Smile Jamaica Concert was held on 10 February 2007.

== Redevelopment ==
National Heroes Park is currently undergoing a series of major renovations. Plans for alterations to the park had been discussed as far back as 1998, but it was not until 2001 that a plan was formally announced. The initial plan called for four phases of construction and a total project cost of $25 million, but delays in work have increased the estimated final cost has to $259 million. The plan calls for the division of the park into four zones: an amphitheatre for formal and cultural activities, a nature area with shade trees, an outdoor activity and recreation area with tracks and playgrounds, and a combined administrative and sports complex.

As of 2009, only the first phase of construction has been completed, with most work to this point focusing on irrigation, parking, and lighting, with some additional work on the gardens and the Eventide memorial. The project's slow pace has been attributed to financial difficulties, as well as administrative changes in the government personnel overseeing the renovations. Funding was to be provided by the government, the Environmental Foundation of Jamaica, and private donors, but private donations have been scarce due to the park's close proximity to several depressed neighborhoods and high-crime areas.

The Jamaica National Heritage Trust announced plans for a monument to Hugh Shearer in 2009. The monument is located near those of Michael Manley and Donald Sangster, and its design was determined by an open competition.
