= Tessa Prendergast =

Jamaican actress and fashion designer

- Prendergast, publicity photo, c. 1953
- Born: Marie Therese Prendergast; 17 October 1928; Kingston, Jamaica
- Died: 9 July 2001 (aged 72); London, United Kingdom
- Occupations: Actress; fashion designer; businesswoman; socialite
- Years active: 1950s–1960s
- Spouses: Scotty Welbourne (m. 1953; div. 1958) William Davies (m. 1961; died 1982)
- Children: 1

Marie Therese "Tessa" Prendergast (17 October 1928 – 9 July 2001), also known as Tessa Welborn, was a Jamaican actress, fashion designer, businesswoman, and socialite. A renowned beauty and movie starlet in the 1950s, she is best-remembered today as the designer of the taboo-breaking white bikini worn by Ursula Andress in the 1962 film Dr. No.

== Life and career ==
Welborn was born in Kingston, Jamaica on 17 October 1928. Her father, Luke Welborn, was a wealthy plantation owner who died while Tessa was in her infancy. Her mother later married Noel Nethersole, an Oxford-educated economist and cricketer who, along with future Prime Minister Norman Manley, established the People's National Party. Her step-father served as Jamaica's minister of finance from 1955 to 1959, and founded the Bank of Jamaica. Several years after his death in 1959, his image appeared on the Jamaican $20 banknote. She was raised in London, England. Although she would spend most of her life in Britain, she regularly visited Jamaica, and at times lived and worked there.

With her looks and figure, Welborn gained notice while singing and dancing at London's Pigalle nightclub. She began doing bit parts in British films, mostly in "exotic" roles, such as performing the Dance of the Seven Veils in the film Song of Paris. She caught the attention of Warner Brothers, with whom she signed in the early 1950s. She appeared as a Polynesian girl in His Majesty O'Keefe, starring Burt Lancaster, and then in a larger role in Manfish, an adventure film shot in her native Jamaica. She became best known, however, for her glamour photos in magazines and her "scandalous affairs", such as a widely publicized 1955 incident in Rome, in which King Farouk of Egypt and an unnamed Italian prince allegedly came nearly to blows in vying for her affection. Although known for her imperious temper and connections with European royalty, these stories were almost certainly exaggerated.

In 1953 she had married American cinematographer Scotty Welbourne, with whom she had a child. In the late 1950s she left acting to start a clothing design business with Liz de Lisser in Montego Bay, Jamaica. Although divorced in 1958, she used the name "Welborn".

In 1962, the producers of the James Bond film Dr. No (which was to be filmed in Jamaica) asked Welborn to provide wardrobe for actress Ursula Andress. Working with Andress, she created the ivory hipster bikini which, daring for its time, started a new trend in women's swimwear, made Andress a major star, and became an enduring movie icon. Said Andress: "This bikini made me into a success. As a result of starring in Dr. No as the first Bond girl, I was given the freedom to take my pick of future roles and to become financially independent."

She eventually married William Davies and returned to London, where, in the mid-1970s, she took over the Little House Club, a private members' drinking club founded in 1928 in Shepherd Market, Mayfair. She continued to operate the club, and the Shepherd Market Association, a charitable organization, until she died, in London, on 9 July 2001. That same year, the swim outfit she'd created with Andress was sold at Christie's to Robert Earl, owner of the Planet Hollywood restaurant chain, for £41,125.

== Filmography ==
Year	Title	Role	Notes
1952	Song of Paris	Seven Veils dancer	alternate title: Bachelor in Paris
1954	His Majesty O'Keefe	Kakofel	
1956	Helen of Troy	Role	Uncredited
1956	Manfish	Alita	(final film role)
1962	Dr. No	—N/a	Costumes (credited as Tessa Welborn)
