= Persecution of Rastafari =

Persecution of members of the Rastafari movement, an Abrahamic religion founded in Jamaica in the early 1930s among Afro-Jamaican communities, has been fairly continuous throughout the religion's development. Current issues relate to their spiritual use of cannabis and discrimination related to spiritual hair styles, mainly dreadlocks.

== The Formation of Rastafari ==
There was a growing grassroots movement in Jamaica that combined Ethiopianism, a belief that black people in the new world will be rescued by God as his chosen people, with faith healing and revival churches. Laws like the Obeah Act of 1898, which made it Illegal to use or pretend to use supernatural powers or knowledge, and the Medical Law of 1908, which created a council to regulate medical practice in Jamaica, were used to disrupt these movements and redirect medical and religious authority back to the state. One of the most prominent figures of this period was Alexander Bedward, a faith healer and self-proclaimed profit. He was eventually locked up in a asylum for his religious claims.

== Official Rastafarian Persecution ==
The first Rastafari to appear in a court was Leonard Howell in Jamaica in 1934 who was charged with sedition for refusing to accept George V of the United Kingdom as his King, instead insisting that he was only loyal to Haile Selassie and the Ethiopian Empire. He was found guilty and sentenced to several years in prison.

By the 1950s, Rastafari's message of pride and unity had unnerved the ruling class of Jamaica. In 1954, the Pinnacle commune was destroyed by Jamaican authorities.

In 1963, following a violent confrontation between Rastafarians and Jamaican police forces at a gas station, the Jamaican government issued the police and military an order to "bring in all Rastas, dead or alive", resulting in mass arrests, with many of those arrested tortured or killed in what would be known as the Coral Gardens incident.

Attitudes began to change when Haile Selassie I visited Jamaica in April 1966.

According to many Rastas, the illegality of cannabis in many nations is evidence of persecution of Rastafari. They are not surprised that it is illegal, seeing it as a powerful substance that opens people's minds to the truth – something the Babylon system, they reason, clearly does not want. They contrast it to alcohol and other drugs, which they feel destroy the mind.

In 1998, Attorney General of the United States Janet Reno gave a legal opinion that Rastafari do not have the religious right to smoke marijuana in violation of the United States' drug laws. The position is the same in the United Kingdom, where, in the Court of Appeal case of R v Taylor, it was held that the UK's prohibition on cannabis use did not contravene the right to freedom of religion conferred under the European Convention on Human Rights.

On January 2, 1991, at an international airport in his homeland of Guam, Ras Iyah Ben Makahna (Benny Guerrero) was arrested for possession and importation of marijuana and seeds. He was charged with importation of a controlled substance. The case was heard by the US 9th Circuit Court November 2001, and in May 2002 the court had decided that the practice of Rastafari sanctions the smoking of marijuana, but nowhere does the religion sanction the importation of marijuana. Guerrero's lawyer Graham Boyd pointed out that the court's ruling was "equivalent to saying wine is a necessary sacrament for some Christians but you have to grow your own grapes."

== Modern Updates ==
In July 2008, however, the Italian Supreme Court ruled that Rastafari may be allowed to possess greater amounts of cannabis legally, owing to its use by them as a sacrament.

In 2009, Rasta Doug Darrell was arrested after a National Guard helicopter flying over his New Hampshire home found he was growing 15 marijuana plants in his backyard. In a subsequent trial in September 2012, Darrell was found "not guilty" by twelve jurors exercising the right of jury nullification.

Sacramental use of cannabis in celebration of the Rastafari faith became legal in Jamaica on April 15, 2015.

A viral video posted in 2018, showed a high school wrestler, Andrew Johnson, having his dread locks cut in order to compete in a wrestling match. This gained national attention and began a civil rights investigation into the referee, Alan Maloney, who had been previously accused of using racial slurs against a black referee.

== See also ==
- Emperor of Ethiopia
- History of Ethiopia
- History of Jamaica
