= Eventide Home fire =

Disaster in Jamaica in 1980

A fire at the Eventide Home for the Aged in Kingston, Jamaica on 20 May 1980 killed over 145 people. The building that burnt down was overcrowded and had previously been described as a "tinder box." After fire broke out early on the morning of the 20th, the building burnt quickly. There were accusations that arson had been involved, but nothing has been proven. Several remembrances of the fire have taken place in the years since.

== Background ==
The Eventide Home for the Aged was a three building facility operated by the Jamaican government caring for old, disabled, or indigent people. It opened on July 1, 1870. In 1980 one of the buildings, the Myers Ward, had 204 or 211 occupants, all old women, though its legal capacity was only 180. The building was two stories tall and made out of wood. Kingston's fire chief Allen Ridgeway criticized the building, describing it as a "tinder box."

== Fire ==
A fire broke out at the home at around 1 am on 20 May 1980. The building burnt quickly and although firefighters arrived quickly after a fire was reported, they were unable to enter. The home collapsed four minutes after firefighters first arrived. The fire department evacuated disabled children from a nearby building. The New York Times reported that hours later just 33 of the 204 women had been found alive and fourteen were still missing.

== Aftermath ==
The fire chief of Kingston initially theorized that an electrical short could have started the fire and stated that there was no proof of arson. Prime Minister Michael Manley publicly stated shortly after the fire that there was a possibility the fire was started by arsonists—telephone lines going to the building were discovered to have been cut before the fire. Though the fire chief continued to argue against such suggestions, police later noted reports of four men fleeing the building. Manley also proclaimed the following Monday a day of national mourning while money and goods were raised for the victims.

At the time the fire was the most deadly ever in Jamaica, killing over 145 people. Some sources report specific figures of 153 or 157. It was also the worst worldwide since the 1978 Cinema Rex fire. Damages were estimated to be approximately $150,000. On May 27, The Gleaner reported that 145 of those who died had their remains "buried in 26 wooden coffins in a single grave at National Heroes Park" in a funeral that was attended by thousands of people. Six months after the fire the home was attacked by gunmen.

An article in Geographical Review published in 1984 wrote that the cause had never been "legally determined". In 1993 Lee Davis, writing for Facts On File, stated that the fire had been sparked by an electrical short, noting that an ensuing investigation reached that conclusion. The Jamaica Observer wrote in 2018 that the "general view" was the fire was arson.

In 1997 the Sistren Theatre Collective put on their play, QPH, in memory of the fire. It won a National Theatre Critic's Award.

Remembrance events have taken place in at least 2011, and 2020.
