= Independence of Jamaica =

Independence from the UK on 6 August 1962

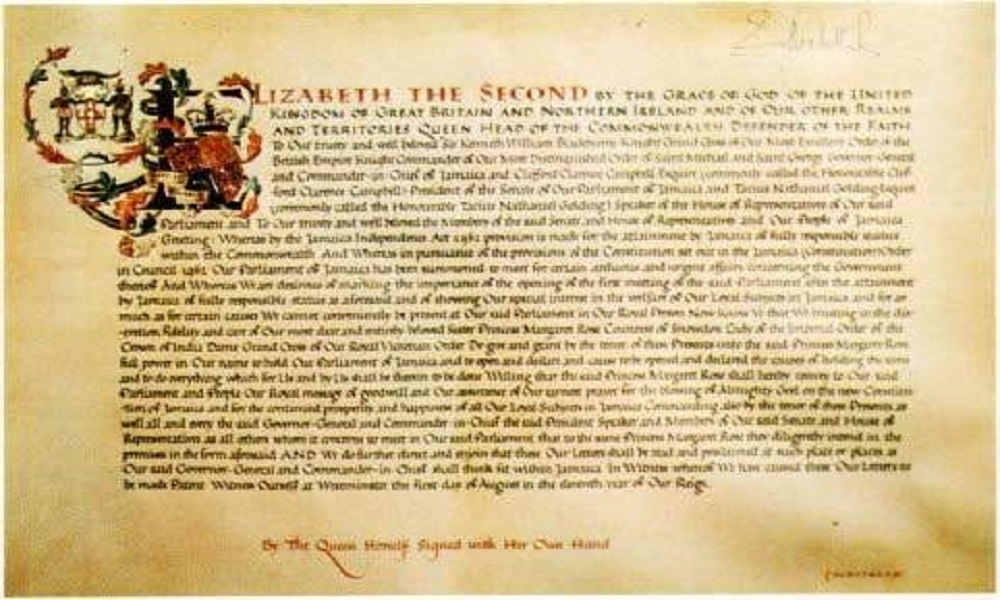
Independence Proclamation of Jamaica

The Colony of Jamaica gained independence from the United Kingdom on 6 August 1962. It is celebrated as Independence Day, a national holiday.

== History up to independence ==
=== Indigenous origins ===
The Caribbean island now known as Jamaica was settled first by hunter-gatherers from the Yucatán and then by two waves of Taino people from South America. Genoan explorer Christopher Columbus arrived in Jamaica in 1494 during his second voyage to the New World, and claimed it for Crown of Castile. At this time, over two hundred villages existed in Jamaica, largely located on the south coast and ruled by caciques, or "chiefs of villages".

=== Spanish rule ===
The Spanish Empire began its official rule in Jamaica in 1509, with formal occupation of the island by conquistador Juan de Esquivel and his men. The Spaniards enslaved many of the native people, overworking and harming them to the point that many perished within fifty years of European arrival. Subsequently, the Spanish Empire’s continuing need for labor was no longer filled by the capacity of the surviving indigenous population. Spanish colonialists adapted by turning to the trade in enslaved Africans. Disappointed by the lack of gold on the island, the Spanish mainly used Jamaica as a military base to supply colonizing efforts in the mainland Americas.

=== British colony ===
After 146 years of Spanish rule, a large group of British sailors and soldiers landed in the Kingston Harbour on 10 May 1655, during the Anglo-Spanish War. The English, who had set their sights on Jamaica after a disastrous defeat in an earlier attempt to take the island of Hispaniola, marched toward Villa de la Vega, the administrative center of the island. Spanish forces surrendered without much fight on 11 May, many of them fleeing to Spanish Cuba or the northern portion of the island.

British colonial jurisdiction over the island was quickly established, with the newly renamed Spanish Town named the capital and home of the local House of Assembly, Jamaica's directly elected legislature.

== Rebellions and brewing nationalism ==
=== Jamaican Maroons ===
The Anglo-Spanish war afforded the opportunity to escape slavery to people enslaved by Spanish colonizers, and many fled into the mountainous and forested regions of the colony to join the ranks of surviving Tainos. As interracial marriage became extremely prevalent, the two racial groups underwent assimilation. The formerly enslaved and their descendants, known as the Jamaican Maroons, were the source of many disturbances in the colony, raiding plantations and occupying parts of the island's interior. Imported African slaves would frequently escape to Maroon territory, known as Cockpit Country. Over the first seventy-six years of British rule, skirmishes between Maroon warriors and the British colonial militia grew increasingly common, along with rebellions by enslaved Blacks.

These conflicts culminated in 1728, when the First Maroon War began between the English and Maroons. Largely owing to the easily defendable, dense forest of Cockpit Country, the British were unsuccessful in defeating the Maroons. Following negotiations, the Maroons were granted semi-autonomy within their five towns, living under a British supervisor and their native leader.

In 1795, tensions between the Maroons of Cudjoe's Town (Trelawny Town) and the British erupted into the Second Maroon War. The conflict ended on a less favorable term for Maroons, with a bloody stalemate reigning over the island for five months. Following the killings of plantation owners and their families and the release of slaves by the Maroons, Major-General George Walpole planned to trap the Maroons in Trelawney Town via the use of armed posts and bloodhounds, pushing them to accept peace terms in early January 1796. Fearing British victory, the Maroons accepted open discussions in March. This delay was used as a pretext to have the large majority of the Trelawney Maroons deported to Nova Scotia. They were later moved to Sierra Leone.

=== Garvey ===
Slavery was abolished in the British Empire by the Slavery Abolition Act in 1834. Following a period of intense debate, the native and African populace of Jamaica were granted the right to vote; as the 19th century continued the government allowed some of them to hold public office. Despite these accomplishments, the white members of Jamaican colonial society continued to hold the real power.

During the first half of the 20th century the most notable Black leader was Marcus Garvey, a labour leader and advocate of Black nationalism. Garvey, rather than advocating independence of Jamaica and other colonies, promoted the Back-to-Africa movement, which called for everyone of African descent to return to the homelands of their ancestors. Garvey, to no avail, pleaded with the colonial government to improve living conditions for indigenous peoples in the West Indies. Upon returning from international travels, he founded the Universal Negro Improvement Association and African Communities League in 1914, which promoted civil rights for blacks in Jamaica and abroad. Garvey served a five-year prison sentence at the Atlanta Federal Penitentiary for defrauding investors in the league, following which he was deported to Jamaica in November 1927, after having his sentence commuted by President Calvin Coolidge. After returning to his place of birth, Garvey tried and failed to be elected into public office. The latter defeat is attributed to his followers lacking the proper voter qualifications. Despite these shortcomings, Marcus Garvey is regarded as a national hero in present-day Jamaica.

=== Party politics ===
The spike of nationalist sentiment in colonial Jamaica is primarily attributed to the British West Indian labour unrest of 1934–39, which protested the inequalities of wealth between native and British residents of the British West Indies. Through these popular opinions Alexander Bustamante, a White native-born moneylender, rose to political prominence and founded the Bustamante Industrial Trade Union. Bustamante advocated autonomy of the island, and a more equal balance of power. He captured the attention and admiration of many black Jamaican youths with his passionate speeches on behalf of Jamaican workers. After a waterfront protest in September 1940, he was arrested by colonial authorities and remained incarcerated for the better part of two years.

As Bustamante Industrial Trade Union gained support, a cousin of Alexander Bustamante's, Norman Manley, founded the People's National Party (PNP), a democratic socialist movement which also advocated trade unions. Although Bustamante was originally a founding member of the PNP, he resigned from his position there in 1939, citing its socialist tendencies as "too radical."

In July 1943, Bustamante launched the Jamaica Labour Party (JLP), which his opponents brushed aside as just a political label of Bustamante Industrial Trade Union. In the following elections, the JLP defeated the PNP with an 18-point lead over the latter in the House of Representatives.

The following year, the JLP led government enacted a new constitution that granted universal adult suffrage, undoing the high voter eligibility standards put in place by British. The new constitution, which was made official on 20 November 1944, established a bicameral legislature and organised an Executive Council made up of ten members of the legislature and chaired by the newly created position of Premier, the head of government. A checks and balances system was also established for this council.

== Path to independence, 1945–1962 ==
As World War II came to a close, a sweeping movement of decolonization overtook the world. British Government and local politicians began a long transition of Jamaica from a crown colony into an independent state. The political scene was dominated by PNP and JLP, with the houses of legislature switching hands between the two throughout the 1950s.

After Norman Manley was elected Chief Minister in 1955, he sped up the process of decolonisation via several constitutional amendments. These amendments allowed for greater self-government and established a cabinet of ministers under a Prime Minister of Jamaica.

Under Manley, Jamaica entered the West Indies Federation, a political union of colonial Caribbean islands that, if it had survived, would have united ten British colonial territories into a single, independent state. Jamaica's participation in the Federation was unpopular, and the results of the 1961 West Indies referendum held by Premier Manley cemented the colony's withdrawal from the union in 1962. The West Indies Federation collapsed later that year following the departure of Trinidad and Tobago.

== Independence ==
Front page of The Daily Gleaner announcing Jamaican independence.

In the elections of 1962, the JLP defeated the PNP, resulting in the ascension of Sir Alexander Bustamante to the premiership in April of that year. On 19 July 1962, the Parliament of the United Kingdom passed the Jamaica Independence Act, granting independence as of 6 August with The Queen remaining as Head of State. On that day, the Union Jack was ceremonially lowered and replaced by the Jamaican flag throughout the country. Princess Margaret opened the first session of the Parliament of Jamaica on behalf of The Queen.

With the independence of Jamaica, the Cayman Islands reverted from being a self-governing territory of Jamaica to direct British rule.

== Since independence ==
Sir Alexander Bustamante became the first Prime Minister of Jamaica, and Jamaica joined the Commonwealth of Nations, an organisation of ex-British territories. Today, Jamaica continues to be a Commonwealth realm, with the British monarch, King Charles III, remaining as King of Jamaica and head of state.

Jamaica spent its first ten years of independence under conservative governments, with its economy undergoing continuous growth. However, as it had been throughout much of its history, the independent Jamaica was plagued by issues of class inequality. After the global economy underwent deterioration, the leftist PNP returned to power after the 1972 elections. Uncertain economic conditions troubled the country well into the 1980s.

Michael Manley, the son of Norman Manley, who led what was largely the opposition party throughout the development of independent Jamaica, went on to become the fourth Prime Minister of Jamaica and maintained the People's National Party's status as one of two major political factions of the country.

== Colonial legacy ==
While independence is widely celebrated within Jamaican society, it has become a subject of debate. In 2011, a survey showed that approximately 60% of Jamaicans "think the country would be better off today if it was still under British rule", citing years of social and fiscal mismanagement in the country.
