= Manfish =

1956 adventure film directed by W. Lee Wilder

- DVD Cover
- Directed by: W. Lee Wilder
- Written by: Edgar Allan Poe (stories); Myles Wilder; Joel Murcott
- Based on: The Gold-Bug and The Tell-Tale Heart by Edgar Allan Poe
- Produced by: W. Lee Wilder
- Starring: John Bromfield; Lon Chaney Jr. Victor Jory
- Cinematography: Scotty "Charles S." Welbourne
- Edited by: Grant K. Smith
- Music by: Albert Elms
- Production company: Planet Filmplays
- Distributed by: United Artists
- Release date: February 1956
- Running time: 87 minutes
- Country: United States
- Language: English

Manfish is a 1956 American adventure film, released by United Artists in 1956 and originally filmed in DeLuxe Color. Filmed in Jamaica, it was released in Great Britain as Calypso. It was based on the 1843 stories "The Gold-Bug" and "The Tell-Tale Heart" by Edgar Allan Poe. Actor John Bromfield starred as Captain Brannigan and Lon Chaney Jr. played the role of Swede. The leading female star was Tessa Prendergast, who played Alita. Tessa later became a fashion designer and designed the white bikini of Ursula Andress for Dr. No. The film also featured the motion picture debut of Barbara Nichols.

== Plot ==
Inspector Warren of Scotland Yard flies into Jamaica and is taken to the headquarters of the Jamaica Constabulary Force. Exchanging credentials with a Jamaican Inspector, Warren reveals he has come to seek the extradition of a wanted criminal known as "The Professor". Surprised when the Inspector refuses to extradite the Professor, the Jamaican Inspector recounts a story told in flashback.

Devil-may-care adventurer Brannigan has won the ship Manfish and its first mate Swede in a poker game but keeps away from the Manfish's creditors. During a drunken evening out Brannigan is attracted to a woman sitting with an older man called "the Professor" with the two brawling over her. During the brief fracas Brannigan notices the Professor is wearing an unusual heavy ring of a skull and cross bones.

The next day the Manfish is at sea engaging in a turtle hunt. Two divers from the ship find a skeleton underwater holding a bottle. Brannigan swims to the skeleton and grabs the bottle. He breaks it open on board finding a ripped piece of paper dated 1793 with nonsensical French written on it, but inside the bottle is the same ring that the Professor wears.

Tracking down the Professor, Brannigan persuades him to tell what he knows revealing it is half of a document by the pirate Jean Lafitte with the professor holding the other half.

Fearing for his life but clever and greedy, the Professor translates the map to reveal a treasure is on the island of Hispaniola but the Professor insures his safety by destroying the map and memorising the contents. Once on the island a treasure worth £25,000 is recovered but the Professor promises it is a drop in the ocean compared to another treasure buried later by Lafitte that the Professor says he can locate.

== Cast ==
- John Bromfield as Brannigan
- Lon Chaney Jr. as 'Swede'
- Victor Jory as 'Professor'
- Barbara Nichols as Mimi
- Tessa Prendergast as Alita
- Eric Coverly as Chavez
- Vincent Chang as Domingo
- Theodore Purcell as Big Boy
- Vere Johns as Bianco
- Jack Lewis as Inspector Warren
- Arnold Shanks as Aleppo
- Clyde Hoyte as Calypso

== Soundtrack ==
Big Fish, Manfish and Goodbye written and performed by Clyde Hoyte
Beware the Caribbean written by Richard Koerner and performed by Barbara Nichols

== See also ==
- List of American films of 1956
- List of films in the public domain in the United States
