= Helene Davis-Whyte =

Jamaican trade union activist

Helene Davis-Whyte (born 1956) is a Jamaican trade union activist and the general secretary of the Jamaica Association of Local Government Officers (JALGO), which represents 5,000 workers in local and national government and quasi-government agencies in Jamaica. She is also a vice-president of the Jamaica Confederation of Trade Unions.

== Early life ==
Helene Davis was one of four children. Her father was a businessman, and she says her childhood was a prosperous and happy one. She attended Queens High School in Kingston. But while in her Sixth form, her father's business began to fail. She dropped out of school to go to work and support the family. "Sometimes I left home without breakfast; I never had the lunch money and when I got home, I was not sure that I would see dinner," she said.

She had her first child at the age of 19. Although married, she moved in with a sister (who was also a single parent) to make ends meet.

In 1995 she married Frederick Whyte, a former commissioner of the Jamaica Fire Brigade, and had a second child.

== Union career ==
In the early 1980s Davis-Whyte worked at the Kingston and St. Andrew Corporation. "I was probably one of the most anti-union persons" working in local government, she admitted. But when a new mayor promised to lay off members of her department, she and other workers decided to ask for JALGO's assistance. During a meeting with then-general secretary E. Lloyd Taylor, Davis-Whyte became the speaker for the group. Her co-workers were so impressed with her representation of their issues that they elected her a delegate to JALGO, and she became increasingly involved in union work.

Davis-Whyte was elected vice-president of JALGO's Municipal Branch, and in 1984 was elected the national union's education officer. In 1995, after Taylor's retirement, she was elected general secretary (the union's highest office), and was re-elected in 1998, 2001 and 2004. Her nomination was a tumultuous one, and nearly caused a riot on the convention floor.

During her tenure as union leader, Davis-Whyte has opposed the flexible work-week for reducing workers' hours, pushed for reorganization of public welfare services, and urged a collaborative approach to policy making in which unions would participate in commissions, boards and advisory bodies in order to alleviate the impact of austerity measures.

== Education ==
Helene Davis-Whyte holds an associate degree in business studies and professional certificates in trade union studies and labour economics.

She received a Bachelor of Science degree in human resource management from the University College of the Caribbean (UCC) in 2006.

== Notes ==
Preceded by E. Lloyd Taylor	President, Jamaica Association of Local Government Officers; 1995 – Present	Succeeded by Incumbent
