= Roxborough, Manchester =

Roxborough
- Small rural community
- Location within Jamaica
- Coordinates: 18.0176°N 77.4691°W
- Country: Jamaica
- Parish: Manchester

Roxborough is a former estate and now a small community south of Mandeville in Manchester, Jamaica. It was the birthplace of Jamaican National Hero and politician Norman Washington Manley.

== History of the estate and great house ==
The estate was originally called "Roxbro Castle". Over the years the great house became derelict until, despite renovation proposals, it was destroyed by fire in 1968. As of 2012 there are again proposals from the Jamaica National Heritage Trust to restore the building.

== Economy ==
The main economic activity is small-scale agriculture in which the principle crops are corn, bananas, sugarcane, ackee and marijuana.

== Notable people ==
Notable people from Roxborough include:

- Norman Washington Manley (Jamaican National Hero)
- Turbulence (reggae artist)
- Mr Perfect (reggae musician)
