= Coral Gardens incident =

1963 mass arrest of Rastafarians in Jamaica

- Location: Jamaica
- Date: April 11–13, 1963
- Target: Rastafari followers
- Deaths: At least 8
- Victim: Up to 150 detained.
- Perpetrator: Jamaican police

The Coral Gardens incident, also known as the Coral Gardens atrocities, the Coral Gardens massacre, the Coral Gardens riot, and Bad Friday refers to a series of events that occurred in Jamaica from April 11 until April 13, 1963. Following a violent altercation at a gas station in Montego Bay, Jamaican police and military forces detained Rastafarians throughout Jamaica, killing and torturing many. Estimates place the number of detained individuals as high as 150.

In April 2017, following a legal investigation, the government of Jamaica issued an official apology, and condemned its own actions in the incident. It also established a trust fund to aid survivors harmed in the incident.

== Background ==
=== The Rastafari community in Jamaica in the late 1950s ===
The years prior to the Coral Gardens incident saw the building of tensions between the Rasta community and the British colonial government in Jamaica. In 1958, British police engaged in several arrests and evictions of Rastas, often bringing to bear charges for the possession of cannabis, which is used as a Rastafari religious sacrament. Several of these incidents resulted in police killings of Rastafari, and some of those arrested were reportedly never seen again. Due to alleged violence on the part of the Rastas and public discourse which emphasized "anti-social" aspects of the Rastafarian faith, public opinion in Jamaica largely sided with the police against the Rastafarians.

In 1959, a confrontation between a Rastafari security guard and a policeman at Coronation Market resulted in the police beating the security guard, which prompted a violent response from nearby shop owners. The police brought reinforcements, arresting 57 Rastafarians and brutally beating and forcibly shaving the dreadlocks off of some of them. A police car and fire truck were also set on fire during this incident. Later that year, Rastafari leader Reverend Claudius Henry was accused of plotting a revolution and communicating with Fidel Castro. In 1960, Henry's son Reynold was arrested on the grounds of plotting a revolt, and following a declaration of a state of emergency Reynold Henry and his co-conspirators were executed. Following these events, the government began to arbitrarily arrest members of the Rastafari community, under the justification that Rastafarians were involved in orchestrating a communist revolution.

In 1962, Jamaica was granted independence, but anti-Rastafarian sentiment continued to be prevalent in the government and police forces, which increasingly viewed the Rastafarians as a security threat. In police training schools, officers would often train using images of Rastafarians as target practice. This sentiment was echoed in general society as well, with Rastafarians often being beaten by civilians, forcing Rastafarians to avoid public spaces.

=== The Coral Gardens property and Rudolph Franklyn ===
Coral Gardens was part of a larger property, the Rose Hall estate (which includes the Rose Hall mansion). This property was the site of both small-scale farming by Rastafarians, as well as the ambitions of landlords and government officials who hoped to convert the area into a tourist destination. The government and landlords saw the Rastafarians as an obstacle to their goal of re-purposing the property for tourism, and frequently sent police to evict the Rastafarians. In one such incident in 1961, police attacked Rudolph Franklyn, shooting him six times in the stomach and leaving him for dead. Franklyn received surgery in a hospital to repair his stomach, but was reportedly told by a doctor that once the plastic "rotted", his wounds would reopen and he would die. Following his surgery, Franklyn was immediately arrested on the grounds of cannabis possession and sentenced to six months in prison. After his release from prison, Franklyn reportedly swore to take revenge against the overseer who had attempted to evict him, Edward Fowler.

== The incident ==
=== The gas station ===
Accounts differ as to the specifics of what happened on April 11. According to police reports, a group of Rastafarians armed with spears, hatchets, and machetes set fire to a gas station as part of an attempted robbery. A skirmish resulted between the Rastafarians and the police who arrived at the gas station, resulting in the deaths of three Rastafarians, two policemen, and three civilians also on the scene. A separate account, published in Public Opinion and supported by relatives of Rudolph Franklyn, as well as Syracuse professor Horace Campbell, asserts that the violence at the gas station was the result of previous conflicts between Franklyn and other Rastafarians in the area on one hand, and the police and property owners on the other.

=== Further repression ===
Following the skirmish at the gas station, a police manhunt tracked down and killed the other Rastafari who had been present at the skirmish. Jamaican newspapers such as The Daily Gleaner published many articles demonizing the Rastafari and demanding armed intervention by the state. Media also originally described the events at Coral Gardens as an "uprising", and were later forced to retract their characterization of the event by the Labour Party-led government.

On 12 April, Good Friday, Prime Minister Alexander Bustamante gave an order to "Bring in all Rastas, dead or alive". Police and military forces entered working class neighborhoods and Rastafari encampments to detain Rastafarians, and forcibly cut the dreadlocks of those who were detained. Many Rastafarians were tortured and killed, and the exact tally is unknown. One estimate suggests that "as many as 150" individuals were detained over the following day.

== Legacy ==
Following the events of April 11–13, two narratives of the incident emerged. One view held that the events of the Good Friday weekend constituted an unlawful uprising by the Rastafarians; this view was supported by contemporary media reports of the events and the statements of government officials at the time. Meanwhile, the Rastafarian community in Jamaica held that the actions of Rudolph Franklyn and his compatriots were a justified reaction to decades of persecution by the government and perceived the mass arrests that followed as an abuse of state powers, a view that has been reflected by more recent academic scholarship.

The event has been commemorated yearly by the Rastafarian community in Jamaica. In 2011, a documentary film about the incident was released, titled Bad Friday: Rastafari After Coral Gardens.

=== Government investigation and recognition ===
In 2015, Public Defender Arlene Harrison Henry submitted a report to the Parliament of Jamaica detailing an investigation of the Coral Gardens incident, and recommending that the government provide financial reparations for the injuries, abuses and deaths caused by its actions against the Rastafarian community.

In April 2017, the government of Jamaica issued a formal apology for the incident, taking responsibility "without equivocation" and stating that the incident "should never have happened". The government has established a trust fund of J$10 million (~$78,000 USD) for survivors as reparations for the incident. The government also promised to recognize Pinnacle, Saint Catherine Parish, a site with historical relevance to the Rastafarian community, as a protected site under the Jamaica National Heritage Trust.
