= National Environment and Planning Agency =

National Environment and Planning Agency (NEPA)
Agency overview
- Formed: April 1, 2001
- Preceding agencies: Natural Resources Conservation Authority (NRCA); Town and Country Planning Authority (TCPA); Land Development and Utilisation Commission (LDUC)
- Type: Executive Agency
- Jurisdiction: Jamaica
- Status: Operational
- Headquarters: Jamaica
- Agency executive: Peter Knight, Acting Chief Executive Officer
- Parent department: Ministry of Economic Growth and Job Creation
- Website: nepa.gov.jm

The National Environment and Planning Agency is a Jamaican government agency responsible for environmental protection, land use, natural resource management, and spatial planning.

It is an Executive Agency of the Ministry of Economic Growth and Job Creation that became operational on April 1, 2001.

NEPA was founded to carry out the technical and administrative mandate of three statutory bodies:

- the Natural Resources Conservation Authority (NRCA)
- the Town and Country Planning Authority (TCPA)
- the Land Development and Utilisation Commission (LDUC)

The acting chief executive officer is Peter Knight.

== See also ==
- Ministries and agencies of the Jamaican government
