= Jamaica Confederation of Trade Unions =

Trade union center in Jamaica

JCTU
- Jamaica Confederation of Trade Unions
- Founded: 1994
- Headquarters: Kingston, Jamaica
- Location: Jamaica
- Members: 11 unions
- Key people: Wayne Jones, general secretary
- Affiliations: ITUC

The Jamaica Confederation of Trade Unions (JCTU) is a national trade union centre in Jamaica. It is affiliated to the International Trade Union Confederation.

== Origins ==
The JCTU emerged from the Joint Trade Unions Research Development Centre (JTURDC) which was founded on 11 September 1980 by the Bustamante Industrial Trade Union, the National Workers Union, the Jamaica Association of Local Government Officers and the Trade Union Congress.

== Presidents ==
1994: Hugh Shearer
2004: Lloyd Goodleigh
2016: Helene Davis-Whyte
2023: St. Patrice Ennis

== See also ==
- List of trade unions
- List of federations of trade unions
