= National Workers Union (Jamaica) =

Jamaican general trade union

- Founded: 1952
- Headquarters: Kingston, Jamaica
- Location: Jamaica
- Key people: Granville Valentine (General Secretary)
- Website: www.nationalworkersunion.org

The National Workers Union (NWU) is a general trade union in Jamaica. The National Workers Union was founded on 2 April 1952 emerging as a result of a split within the Trade Union Congress and factional alignments within the People's National Party (PNP). The NWU became the main trade union of the PNP. The NWU was a founding member of the Jamaica Confederation of Trade Unions.
