= Juby Bustamante =

Spanish journalist (1938–2014)

- Born: María Jubilia Fernández Bustamante; 11 September 1938; Santander, Spain
- Died: 10 July 2014 (aged 75); Madrid, Spain
- Occupation: Journalist
- Employers: Madrid; Cambio 16; Thyssen-Bornemisza Museum
- Spouse: Miguel Ángel Aguilar
- Awards: Gold Medal for Merit at Work

María Jubilia Fernández Bustamante (11 September 1938 – 10 July 2014), better known as Juby Bustamante, was a Spanish journalist.

== Career ==
The daughter of sports journalist Agustín "Langarita" Fernández, Juby Bustamante started her career at the Cantabrian newspaper Alerta in her native Santander, but soon moved to Madrid where she wrote for La Estafeta Literaria. She specialized in cultural journalism, although she worked in other fields, becoming a distinguished voice of the Spanish transition to democracy. In the words of journalist Nativel Preciado, "she was a fascinating narrator and had a strong literary style."

She worked at the daily Madrid, closed in 1971 by the dictatorship of Francisco Franco. From there she went to the magazine Cambio 16 where she was part of the founding team of Diario 16. She left the newspaper in 1982 to join the Ministry of Culture as Javier Solana's press officer during the Felipe González administration, where she stayed until 1988. With the arrival of Jorge Semprún to the ministry, she became its cabinet director. After her retirement in 1991, she was appointed director of communication for the Thyssen-Bornemisza Foundation where she remained until her retirement in 2006.

She was the wife of journalist Miguel Ángel Aguilar and mother of two children, Miguel and Andrea.

== Acknowledgments ==
In 2011, during the second government of José Luis Rodríguez Zapatero, she was awarded the Gold Medal for Merit at Work.
