= Norman Manley =

Premier of Jamaica from 1959 to 1962

The Right Excellent Norman Manley ONH MM QC
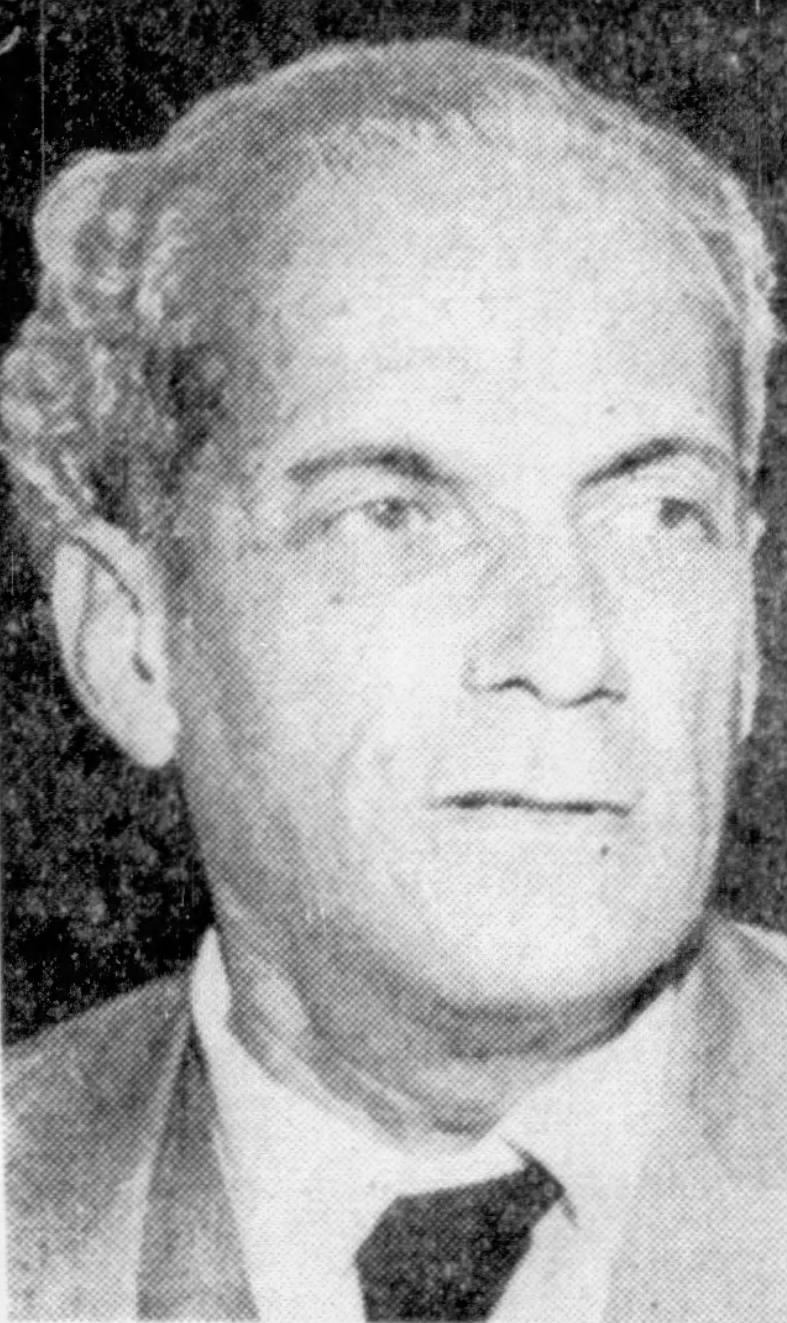
- Manley in 1955

1st Premier of Jamaica
- In office 14 August 1959 – 29 April 1962
- Monarch: Elizabeth II
- Governor: Kenneth Blackburne
- Preceded by: Himself as Chief Minister
- Succeeded by: Alexander Bustamante

2nd Chief Minister of Jamaica
- In office 2 February 1955 – 14 August 1959
- Monarch: Elizabeth II
- Governor: The Lord Caradon
- Preceded by: Alexander Bustamante
- Succeeded by: Himself as Premier

Leader of the Opposition
- In office 1962–1969
- Preceded by: Himself
- Succeeded by: Michael Manley

Personal details
- Born: Norman Washington Manley; 4 July 1893 Roxborough, Manchester, Colony of Jamaica
- Died: 2 September 1969 (aged 76) Kingston, Jamaica
- Party: People's National Party
- Spouse: Edna Swithenbank (m. 1921)
- Relations: Alexander Bustamante (first cousin)
- Children: Douglas Manley; Michael Manley
- Education: Jamaica College
- Alma mater: Jesus College, Oxford (BCL)
- Profession: Lawyer

Military service
- Allegiance: United Kingdom
- Branch/service: British Army
- Years of service: 1914–1918
- Unit: Royal Field Artillery
- Battles/wars: World War I
- Awards: Military Medal

Norman Washington Manley ONH MM QC (4 July 1893 – 2 September 1969) was a Jamaican statesman who served as the first and only premier of Jamaica. A Rhodes Scholar, Manley became one of Jamaica's leading lawyers in the 1920s. Manley was an advocate of universal suffrage, which was granted by the British colonial government to the colony in 1944.

Encouraged by Osmond Theodore Fairclough, who had joined forces with the brothers Frank and Ken Hill, Hedley P. Jacobs and others in 1938, he helped to launch the People's National Party which later was affiliated to the Trade Union Congress and even later the National Workers Union. He led the PNP in every election from 1944 to 1967. Their efforts resulted in the New Constitution of 1944, granting full adult suffrage.

Manley served as the colony's Chief Minister from 1955 to 1959, and as Premier from 1959 to 1962. He was a proponent of self-government but was persuaded to join nine other British colonies in the Caribbean territories in a Federation of the West Indies. He called a referendum on the issue in 1961, which was rejected by voters, who chose for Jamaica to withdraw from the union.

Manley arranged Jamaica's withdrawal from the union, chaired the committee and led the team that negotiated Jamaica's independence from the UK. Manley then opted to call a general election even though his five-year mandate was barely halfway through. Manley's PNP lost at the 1962 Jamaican general election and Manley became the first Leader of the Opposition. Jamaica gained its independence later that year on 6 August 1962.

He was the father of Jamaican Prime Minister Michael Manley, who succeeded him as leader of the PNP.

== Early life ==
Norman Manley was born to mixed-race parents in Roxborough in Jamaica's Manchester Parish. His father, Thomas Albert Samuel Manley, was a small businessman born in Porus, Manchester, Jamaica in 1852. His mother, Margaret Ann Shearer, was the daughter of a mixed-race widow named Ann Margaret Clarke (née Taylor) and her Irish husband, Alexander Shearer, a pen-keeper on a farm. His paternal grandparents were Samuel Manley, a white English trader who had migrated from Yorkshire, and Susannah Patterson, a Black woman of the Comfort Hall plantation in Manchester. Samuel Manley later married Esther Anderson Stone, a Black woman of St. Elizabeth.

Thomas Manley initially succeeded in citrus farming but soon squandered his earnings through litigious activities. Once he died in 1899, Margaret Manley moved her four children to the Belmont estate near Spanish Town.

Manley was a scholar, soldier, and athlete. He attended Wolmer's Schools and Beckford & Smith High School before winning a full scholarship to Jamaica College. In 1911, he won six medals in the Jamaican schoolboy championships, including the 100 yards in 10 seconds, setting a record unbroken until 1952. This time would have qualified him for the Olympic finals in 1908 and 1912. Following his mother's death in 1913, Manley and two siblings travelled to the UK to continue their studies. Orphaned at 16, Manley earned a Rhodes Scholarship to study at Jesus College at the University of Oxford where he earned a Bachelor of Civil Law with First Class Honours.

Manley arrived in the UK shortly after World War I had begun and visited a number of relatives, including his White cousin, Edna Manley. In her diaries published in 1969, Edna later remarked that Norman was "[a] scholar, sportsman, and a strange, strange personality. He had won the Rhodes, nearly died of typhoid, had a hundred yards record which was a world record for a schoolboy. I came into supper—full of sunshine and running. I was fourteen and he stood there in front of the empty fireplace—his hands in his pockets—swaying—handsome, faun-like—smiling mischievously ... I studied him and met a mocking smile—and something somewhere deep down touched."

Manley served in the Royal Field Artillery during World War I and was awarded the Military Medal for "acts of gallantry and devotion to duty under fire".

== Political career ==
After the war, Manley was admitted to the bar in England in 1921, and returned to Jamaica in 1922, continuing to practise law as a barrister.

In the years of the Great Depression, and during the troubles of 1938, Manley identified with the workers, donating his time and advocacy to assist them. In September of that year, Manley co-founded the People's National Party, which was tied to the Trade Union Congress and later the National Workers Union. The PNP supported the trade union movement including the Bustamante Industrial Trade Union, then led by Bustamante. At the same time, Manley worked for Universal Adult Suffrage.

In 1943, Bustamante split from the PNP, and formed his own party, called the Jamaica Labour Party (JLP). After suffrage was approved in 1944, Manley had to wait ten years (two terms) before his party was elected to office. In the 1944 elections, the JLP won an 18 percent majority of the votes over the PNP, as well as 22 seats in the 32-member House of Representatives. The PNP won 5 seats and 5 were gained by other, short-lived parties. Bustamante took office as the unofficial leader of government.

The 1949 Jamaican general election was much closer. The PNP received more votes (203,048) than the JLP (199,538), but the JLP secured more seats; 17 to the PNP's 13. Two seats were won by independents. The voter turnout was 65.2%.

In the year of 1954, the PNP expelled Richard Hart, a Marxist, and three other PNP members for their (alleged) communist views. The other three members were Frank Hill, Ken Hill and Arthur Henry, and they were collectively referred to as "the four H's".

Hart and the other members of "the four H's" were very active in the trade union movement in Jamaica. In the 1940s and 1950s. Hart worked as a member of the executive committee of the Trade Union Council from 1946 to 1948. He served as Assistant Secretary of the Caribbean Labour Congress from 1945 to 1946 and Assistant Secretary from 1947 to 1953.

In the 1955 Jamaican general election, the PNP won for the first time, securing 18 out of 32 seats. The JLP ended up with 14 seats, and there were no independents. The voter turnout was 65.1%. As a result, Norman Manley became the new chief minister.

The 1959 Jamaican general election was held on 28 July 1959, and the number of seats was increased to 45. The PNP secured a wider margin of victory, taking 29 seats to the JLP's 16.

== Chief Minister of Jamaica ==
Manley served as chief minister from 1955 to 1959. While serving in this position, a number of progressive reforms were carried out. The Facilities for Title Act of 1955, for instance, enabled people who occupy land for more than seven years to obtain credit for development. The Housing Law of 1955 made the state (as noted by one study) “a systematic developer and landlord, armed with legal authority to acquire land, prepare housing schemes, construct dwellings, allocate tenancies, and recover rents and purchase prices.” As a result of this law, many new houses were built. The Loans To Small Business Act was passed in 1956 (as noted by one study) "to provide for the establishment of a board to grant loans and other forms of financial assistance to persons engaged in carrying on small businesses." The Factories (Amendment) Law of 1956 extended the scope of a previous factory law to include (as noted by one study) “workshops and other places employing 10 or more industrial workers and which do not utilise mechanical power.” In addition, the Shops and Offices Act of 1957 included various provisions aimed at ensuring good working conditions for those employed in offices and shops.

One of his biggest goals as chief minister was to make sure all children had access to a public education. The late 1950s saw the creations of the Common Entrance Examination, the Jamaica Institute of Technology and Caledonia Junior College.

== Premier of Jamaica ==
Manley was appointed Jamaica's first premier on 14 August 1959.

Various reforms were carried out during Manley's time in office. Thousands of small farmers were provided with subsidies, while new markets were opened for increase of products in various fields. The Jamaica Broadcasting Corporation was set up for public education and entertainment as well as to encourage Jamaican creative talent, public library facilities were extended to all parishes, and primary schools were built. Agricultural aid was also increased.

In regards to working conditions, The Quarries (General) Regulations of 1958 prescribed provisions related to welfare, health and safety together with the employment of young persons and women in quarries. The Workmen’s Compensation Law of 1960 was designed (as noted by one study) “to make more liberal provisions for compensation so far as local circumstances permit.” The protection of the law, for example, was extended (as one study has noted) “to cover certain persons for whose support the injured or deceased workman had assumed complete or partial responsibility.” Provision was also made for Workmen’s Compensation Boards to be established in each parish to hear and determine compensation claims. Also in 1960, a pension scheme for sugar workers was introduced. The Shops and Offices Act was passed in May 1961 "to provide for the regulation of the hours of business of shops and offices and for the welfare and the regulation of the hours of work of persons employed in or about the business of shops and offices."

== The West Indies Federation ==
Manley was a strong advocate of the Federation of the West Indies as a means of propelling Jamaica into self-government. When Bustamante declared that the opposition JLP would take Jamaica out of the Federation, Manley, already renowned for his commitment to democracy, called for a referendum, unprecedented in Jamaica, to let the people decide.

In the 1961 Federation membership referendum Jamaica voted 54% to leave the West Indies Federation. The vote was decidedly against Jamaica's continued membership in the Federation. Manley, after arranging Jamaica's orderly withdrawal from the union, set up a joint committee to decide on a constitution for separate independence for Jamaica.

Manley chaired the committee and led the team that negotiated independence. And then he called the election that was to see him become first Leader of the Opposition instead of Jamaica's first Prime Minister. Manley took Jamaica to the polls in April 1962, to secure a mandate for the island's independence. On 10 April 1962, of the 45 seats up for contention in the 1962 Jamaican general election, the JLP won 26 seats and the PNP 19. The voter turnout was 72.9%.

This resulted in the independence of Jamaica on 6 August 1962, and several other British colonies in the West Indies followed suit in the next decade. Bustamante had replaced Manley as premier between April and August, and on independence, he became Jamaica's first prime minister.

== Later years ==
Manley lost the next election to the JLP. In the 1967 Jamaican general election, the JLP were victorious again, winning 33 out of 53 seats, with the PNP taking 20 seats.

He gave his last years of service as Leader of the Opposition, establishing definitively the role of the parliamentary opposition in a developing nation. In his last public address to an annual conference of the PNP, he said:

"I say that the mission of my generation was to win self-government for Jamaica. To win political power which is the final power for the black masses of my country from which I spring. I am proud to stand here today and say to you who fought that fight with me, say it with gladness and pride: Mission accomplished for my generation."

He added:

"And what is the mission of this generation?… It is…reconstructing the social and economic society and life of Jamaica."

Due to respiratory illness, Manley retired from politics on his birthday in 1969. He died later that year, on 2 September 1969. His tomb was designed by the critically acclaimed Jamaican sculptor, Christopher Gonzalez.

== Marriage and family ==
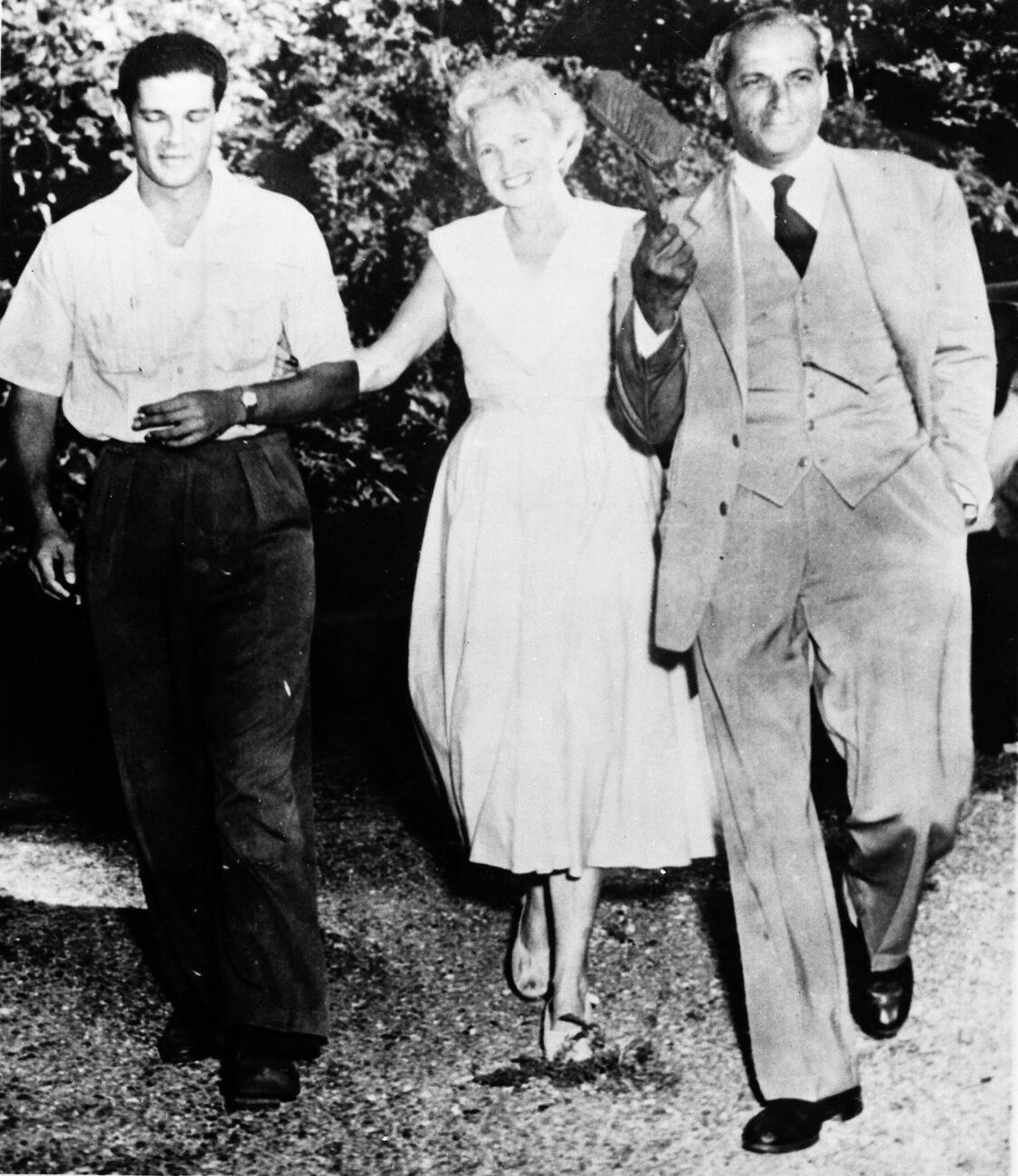
Michael, Edna and Norman Manley in 1955

As a young man, he married his maternal cousin Edna Swithenbank (1 March 1900 – 2 February 1987) in 1921. They had two children together. Their second son, Michael Norman Manley, went into politics and rose to become the fourth Prime Minister of Jamaica. The elder son, Douglas Manley, became a university lecturer, politician and government minister.

Manley was a member of Alpha Phi Alpha fraternity. Manley's speech entitled, To Unite in a Common Battle was delivered in 1945 at the fraternity's Thirty-first General Convention in Chicago, Illinois.

== Legacy and honours ==
After his death, Manley, and his still-living cousin Bustamante, were proclaimed National Heroes of Jamaica on 18 October 1969, joining the black nationalist Marcus Garvey, nineteenth-century hero Paul Bogle, and nineteenth-century politician George William Gordon. Manley, also being the former Premier and Chief Minister of Jamaica, can be seen on the Jamaican Five Dollar Coin and One Thousand Dollar Note, alongside Sir Alexander Bustamante, being portrayed as the country's national hero.

== Notes ==
Preceded by Sir Alexander Bustamante	Chief Minister of Jamaica; 1955–1962	Succeeded by Sir Alexander Bustamante (Position renamed to Prime Minister of Jamaica)
