= Alexander Bustamante =

Jamaican politician and labour leader (1884–1977)

The Right Excellent Sir Alexander Bustamante ONH GBE PC
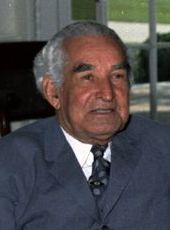
- Bustamante in 1962

1st Prime Minister of Jamaica
- In office 6 August 1962 – 23 February 1967
- Monarch: Elizabeth II
- Governors-General: Sir Kenneth Blackburne; Sir Clifford Campbell
- Deputy: Donald Sangster
- Succeeded by: Sir Donald Sangster

1st Chief Minister of Jamaica
- In office 5 May 1953 – 2 February 1955
- Monarch: Elizabeth II
- Governor: Sir Hugh Foot
- Succeeded by: Norman Manley

Personal details
- Born: William Alexander Clarke; 24 February 1884 Hanover, Colony of Jamaica
- Died: 6 August 1977 (aged 93) Saint Andrew, Jamaica
- Party: Jamaica Labour Party
- Spouse: Gladys Longbridge (m. 1962)
- Relations: Norman Manley (first cousin)

Sir William Alexander Clarke Bustamante ONH GBE PC (born William Alexander Clarke; 24 February 1884 – 6 August 1977) was a Jamaican politician and leader and founder of the Jamaica Labour Party, who, on Independence Day, August 6, 1962, became the first prime minister of Jamaica.

== Early life and education ==
He was born to Mary Clarke (née Wilson), a woman of mixed race, and her husband, Robert Constantine Clarke, the son of Robert Clarke, a White Irish Catholic planter, in Blenheim, Hanover. His grandmother, Elsie Clarke-Shearer, was also the grandmother of Norman Manley.

William said that he took the surname Bustamante to honour a Spanish sea captain who, he claimed, adopted him in his early years and took him to Spain, where he was sent to school before later returning to Jamaica.

However, Bustamante did not leave Jamaica until 1905, when he was 21 years old—and he left as part of the early Jamaican migration to Cuba, where employment opportunities were expanding in the sugar industry. He returned to Jamaica permanently about 30 years later in the 1930s.

Little is known about Bustamante's 30 years spent outside of Jamaica.

== Political career in colonial Jamaica ==
Bustamante became a leader in activism against colonial rule and gained recognition by writing frequent letters on the issues to the Daily Gleaner newspaper. In 1937 he was elected as treasurer of the Jamaica Workers' Union (JWU), which had been founded by labour activist Allan G.S. Coombs. During the 1938 labour rebellion, he quickly became identified as the spokesman for striking workers, who were mostly of African and mixed-race descent. Coombs' JWU became the Bustamante Industrial Trade Union (BITU) after the revolt, and Bustamante became known as "The Chief ".

In 1940, he was imprisoned on charges of subversive activities. The widespread anti-colonial activism finally resulted in Parliament's granting universal suffrage in 1944 to residents in Jamaica. He was defended by N.W. Manley and released from prison in 1943, Bustamante founded the Jamaica Labour Party the same year. Previously he had belonged to the People's National Party (founded in 1938 by his first cousin Norman Manley).

In the 1944 Jamaican general election, Bustamante's party won 22 of 32 seats in the first House of Representatives elected by universal suffrage. He became the unofficial government leader, representing his party as Minister for Communications. Under the new charter, the British governor, assisted by the six-member Privy Council and ten-member Executive Council, remained responsible solely to the Crown. The Jamaican Legislative Council became the upper house, or Senate, of the bicameral Parliament. House members were elected by adult suffrage from single-member electoral districts called constituencies. Despite these changes, ultimate power remained concentrated in the hands of the governor and other high officials. Bustamante's first term as unofficial leader of the government was dogged by controversy. While taking on the role of head of the BITU, he was also leader of government business. In 1947 and 1948, he was elected as mayor of Kingston. In 1947 he was arrested with Frank Pixley and put on trial for manslaughter at the courthouse in Port Maria. He was acquitted. In 1952 he was arrested by the American authorities while he was on official business in Puerto Rico.

The 1949 Jamaican general election was much closer. The PNP received more votes (203,048) than the JLP (199,538), but the JLP secured more seats; 17 to the PNP's 13. Two seats were won by independents. The voter turnout was 65.2%.

The parties lobbied the colonial government for a further increase in constitutional powers for the elected government, and in June 1953 a new constitution provided for the appointment of a chief minister and seven other Ministers from the elected House of Representatives. They now had a majority over the official and nominated members. For the first time, the Ministers could now exercise wide responsibility in the management of the internal affairs of the island. The only limits placed on their powers pertained to public security, public prosecutions and matters affecting members of the Civil Service, which still fell under the Colonial Secretary. In 1953, Bustamante became Jamaica's first chief minister (the pre-independence title for head of government).

Bustamante held this position until the JLP was defeated in 1955. In the 1955 Jamaican general election, the PNP won for the first time, securing 18 out of 32 seats. The JLP ended up with 14 seats, and there were no independents. The voter turnout was 65.1%. As a result, Norman Manley became the new chief minister.

The 1959 Jamaican general election was held on 28 July 1959, and the number of seats was increased to 45. The PNP secured a wider margin of victory, taking 29 seats to the JLP's 16.

Manley was appointed Jamaica's first premier on 14 August 1959. He served 4 years in office.

== Federation and independence ==
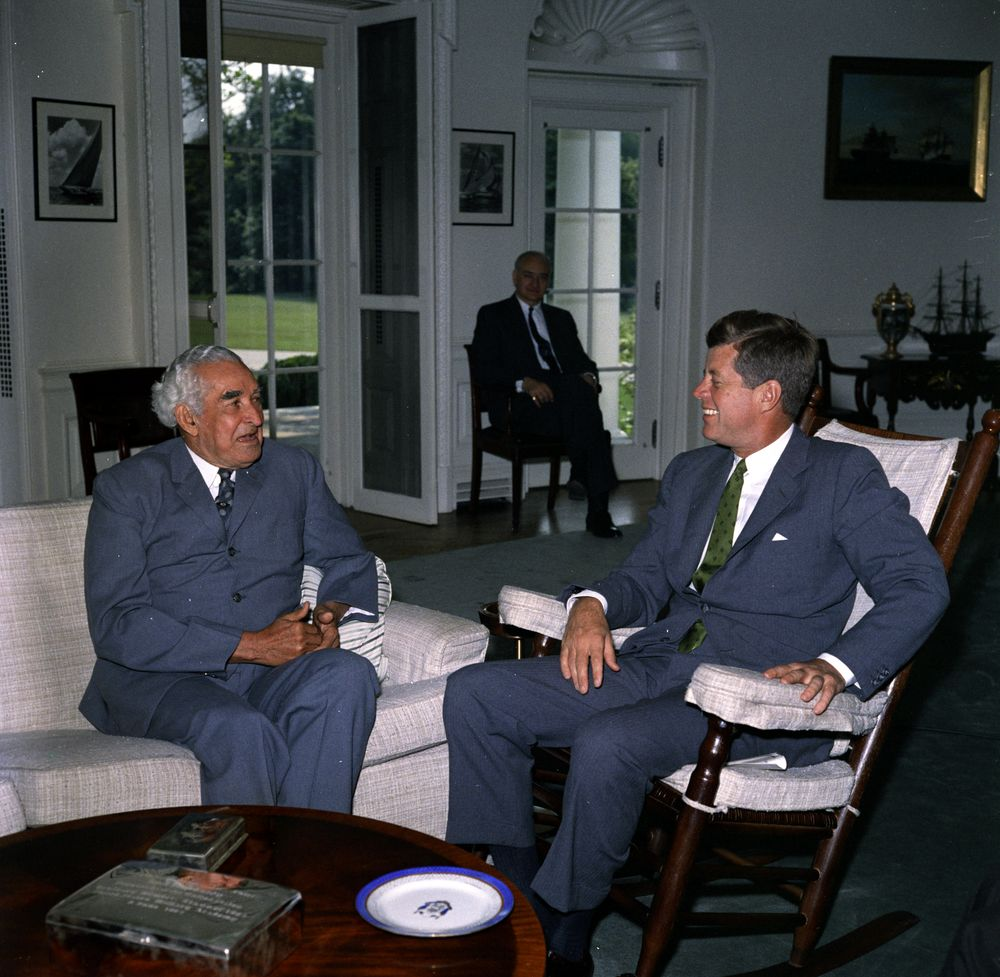
Bustamante in 1962 with U.S. President John F. Kennedy

Though initially a supporter of the Federation of the West Indies, during the 1950s, Bustamante gradually opposed the union. He agitated for Jamaica to become independent of Great Britain. He said that the JLP would not contest a by-election to the federal parliament.

In the 1961 Federation membership referendum Jamaica voted 54% to leave the West Indies Federation. After losing the referendum, Manley took Jamaica to the polls in April 1962, to secure a mandate for the island's independence. On 10 April 1962, of the 45 seats up for contention in the 1962 Jamaican general election, the JLP won 26 seats and the PNP 19. The voter turnout was 72.9%.

This resulted in the independence of Jamaica on 6 August 1962, and several other British colonies in the West Indies followed suit in the next decade. Bustamante had replaced Manley as premier between April and August, and on independence, he became Jamaica's first prime minister.

After Jamaica was granted independence in 1962, Bustamante served as the first Prime Minister until 1967. In April 1963 he ordered the police and army to "Bring in all Rastas, dead or alive" and over 150 Rastas were detained and an unknown number killed. In 1965, after suffering a stroke, he withdrew from active participation in public life. The true power was held by his deputy, Donald Sangster.

On 21 February, in the 1967 Jamaican general election, the JLP were victorious again, winning 33 out of 53 seats, with the PNP taking 20 seats. Two days later, Bustamante retired, and Sangster became Jamaica's second prime minister.

== Relationship with Leonard P. Howell ==
Leonard Howell and Alexander Bustamante had a contentious relationship rooted in ideological differences. Howell, the founder of Rastafari, promoted black nationalism and spiritual empowerment, appealing to Jamaica's poor. Bustamante, a labour leader and Jamaica's first Prime Minister, focused on creole nationalism and political reform within the colonial system. Their conflict peaked when Bustamante, viewing Howell's movement as a threat, called for his confinement in 1939 and ordered raids on Howell's Pinnacle. These actions highlight the tension between Howell's radical vision and Bustamante's pragmatic approach, shaping their opposing roles in Jamaica's history.

Alexander Bustamante, the first Prime Minister of Jamaica and a leader of the Jamaica Labour Party (JLP), perceived Howell and the Rastafarians as revolutionary threats. Bustamante's government engaged in a campaign against Howell, viewing his messages and activities as seditious following significant unrest among the working-class populations in Jamaica. He classed Howell as dangerous, equating Rastafarian identity with lawlessness and rebellion, particularly after events like the Coral Gardens incident in 1963, which intensified state violence against Rastafarians.

== Marriage and family ==
He was married four times. His fourth wife was Gladys Longbridge, who he married on 7 September 1962, at the age of 78. He had no children. His parents were Robert Constantine Clarke, and wife Mary née Wilson.

== Legacy and honours ==
Bustamante was commended in 1955 for his public services in Jamaica. He was awarded an honorary LLD degree from the Fairfield University in 1963. In 1964, he was made a member of the Privy Council of the United Kingdom (PC). In 1966, an honorary LLD degree was conferred on him by the University of the West Indies. In the same year, he was also awarded the Special Grand Cordon of the Order of Brilliant Star by the Republic of China. On 9 June 1967, Bustamante was appointed a Knight Grand Cross of the Order of the British Empire (GBE).

In 1969, Bustamante became a Member of the Order of National Hero (ONH) in recognition of his achievements, this along with Norman Manley, the black liberationist Marcus Garvey, and two leaders of the 1865 Morant Bay rebellion, Paul Bogle and George William Gordon. His portrait graces the Jamaican one dollar coin and one thousand dollar note, alongside Norman Manley.

== Death ==
Bustamante died in 1977 at the Irish Town Hospital and was buried in the National Heroes Park in Kingston.

== Bustamante backbone ==
A Jamaican candy, the Bustamante backbone, is named after him. It is a grated coconut and dark brown sugar confection flavored with fresh grated ginger, cooked to a hard consistency, "which is said to represent his firmness of character." Bustamante was considered a "buster", "a champion of the common man and tough article." The candy is also nicknamed Busta.

Government offices
Preceded by Norman Manley	Prime Minister of Jamaica; 1962-1967	Succeeded by Sir Donald Sangster
Preceded by None (New Position) or British Governors of Jamaica	Chief Minister of Jamaica; 1953-1955	Succeeded by Norman Manley
Trade union offices
Preceded by Union founded	President of the Bustamante Industrial Trade Union; 1938–1977	Succeeded by Hugh Shearer
