= Bustamante Industrial Trade Union =

Trade union center in Jamaica

BITU
- Bustamante Industrial Trade Union
- "You Will Never Work Alone"
- Founded: 1938
- Headquarters: 98-100 Duke Street, Kingston, Jamaica
- Location: Jamaica, West Indies
- General Secretary: George Fyffe
- President: Kavan A. Gayle
- Senior Vice President: Wesley Nelson
- Vice President: Alden Brown
- Affiliations: JCTU, ILO, ITF, UNI, IUF
- Website: https://www.bitujamaica.org/

The Bustamante Industrial Trade Union (BITU, also referred to as the Busta Union) is a trade union center in Jamaica established by Sir Alexander Bustamante. The BITU was formed in 1938, as a split from the Jamaica Workers and Tradesmen's Union. It built up a membership of 54,000 within 6 years. It is affiliated to the International Union of Food, Agricultural, Hotel, Restaurant, Catering, Tobacco and Allied Workers' Association.

== Presidents ==
1938: Alexander Bustamante
1977: Hugh Shearer
2004: Rudyard Spencer
2007: Kavan Gayle
