= 2020 in Jamaica =

- Decades: 2000s; 2010s; 2020s
- See also: Other events of 2020; Timeline of Jamaican history

Events in the year 2020 in Jamaica.

== Incumbents ==
- Monarch: Elizabeth II
- Governor-General: Patrick Allen
- Prime Minister: Andrew Holness
- Chief Justice: Bryan Sykes

== Events ==
- 28 January – 2020 Caribbean earthquake
- 10 March – First confirmed case of COVID-19 in Jamaica

== Deaths ==
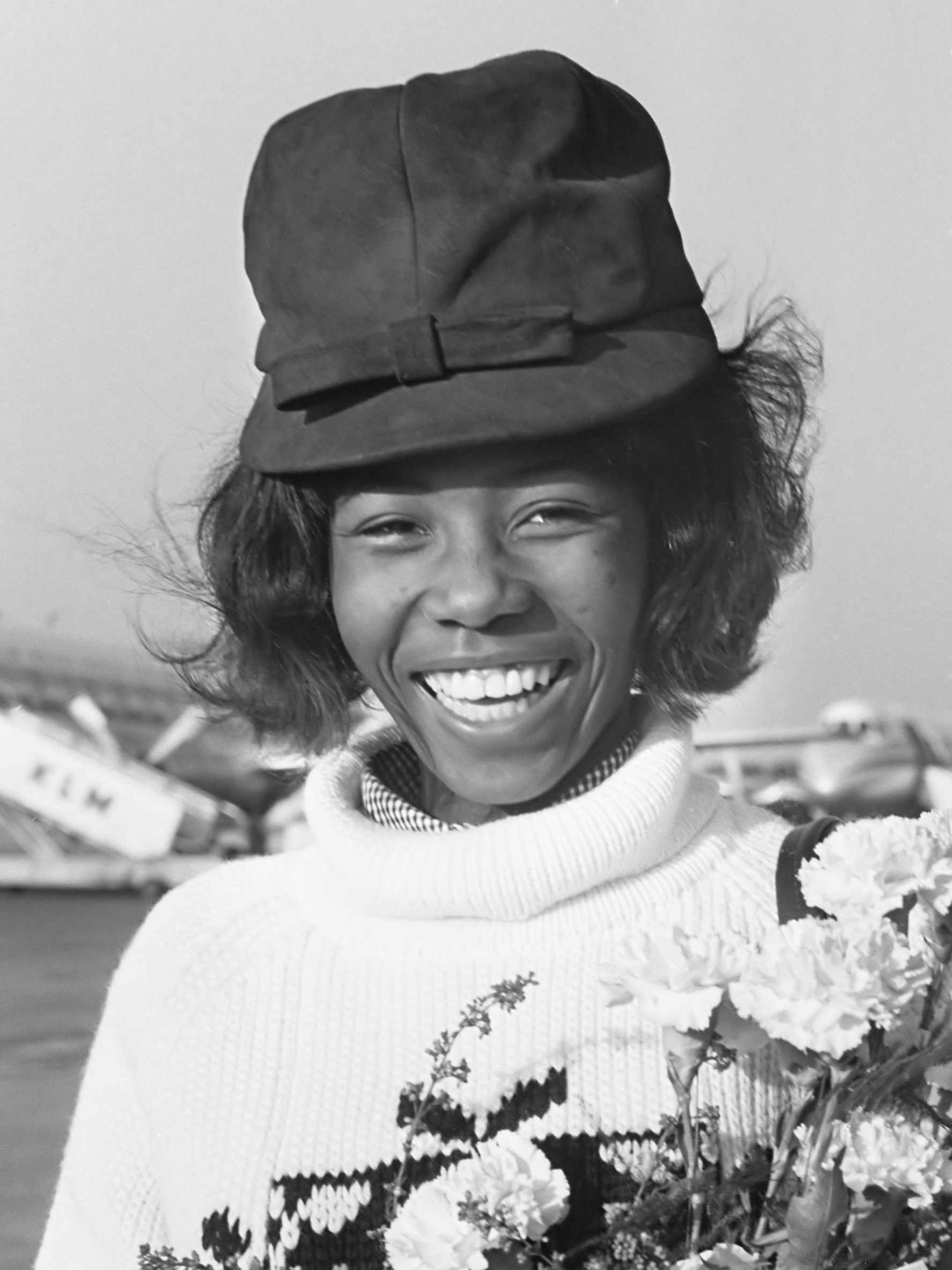
Millie Small

=== January to April ===
- 27 February – Irvino English, footballer (b. 1977).
- 16 March – Lynford Anderson, Jamaican-born American music engineer and producer (b. 1941).
- 23 March – Apple Gabriel, reggae singer (b. 1955).
- 27 March
  - Bob Andy, reggae singer, songwriter and actor (b. 1944).
  - Delroy Washington, British-Jamaican reggae singer (b. 1952).
- 4 April – Ken Farnum, cyclist (b. 1931).
- 6 April – Adlin Mair-Clarke, athlete (1941).
- 8 April – Lois Kelly Miller, actress (b. 1917).
- 13 April – Gil Bailey, radio broadcaster (b. 1936).

=== May to August ===
- 5 May – Millie Small, singer (b. 1947).
- 21 May – Bobby Digital, reggae and dancehall record producer (b. 1961).
- 29 May – Shahine Robinson, politician, MP (b. 1953/1954).
- 18 June – Hux Brown, guitarist (b. 1944).
- 21 July – Dobby Dobson, reggae singer and record producer (b. 1942).
- 23 July – Paulette Wilson, human rights activist (b. 1956).
- 18 August – Patsy Robertson, 86, diplomat and journalist.
- 20 August – Tony Hart, 87, businessman, philanthropist, and politician (b. 1932).

=== September to December ===
- 11 September – Toots Hibbert, 77, singer (Toots and the Maytals) and songwriter ("54-46 That's My Number", "Pressure Drop", "Monkey Man"); COVID-19.
- 15 September – Johnny Gayle, 96, cricket umpire.
- 17 September – Donald Keith Duncan, 80, politician, MP (1976–1983, 2007–2016); COVID-19.
- 6 October – Bunny Lee, 79, reggae producer.
- 15 December – Albert Griffiths, 74, reggae musician (The Gladiators).

== See also ==
- COVID-19 pandemic in Jamaica
- 2020 in the Caribbean
- 2020 Atlantic hurricane season
