= 2022 in Jamaica =

- Decades: 2000s; 2010s; 2020s
- See also: Other events of 2022; Timeline of Jamaican history

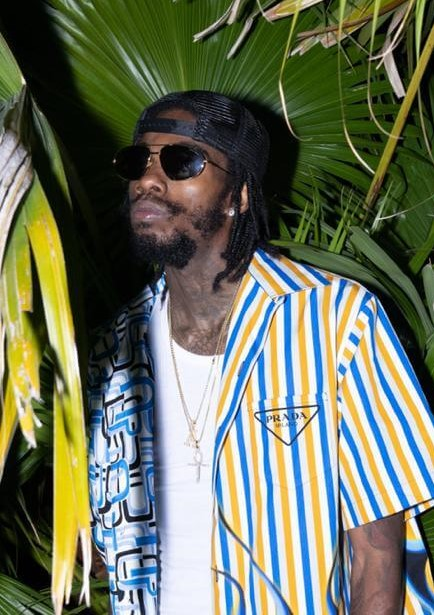
Jamaican artist Alkaline in 2022

Events in the year 2022 in Jamaica.

== Incumbents ==
- Monarch: Elizabeth II (until September 8), then Charles III
- Governor-General: Patrick Allen
- Prime Minister: Andrew Holness
- Chief Justice: Bryan Sykes

== Events ==
Ongoing — COVID-19 pandemic in Jamaica

- 22 – 24 March – The Duke and Duchess of Cambridge toured Jamaica in celebration of the Platinum Jubilee of Elizabeth II.
- 7 July – Jamaica reports its first case of monkeypox.
- 8 September – Accession of Charles III as King of Jamaica following the death of Queen Elizabeth II.
- 13 September – Charles III is officially proclaimed King of Jamaica by the Governor-General at King's House, Kingston.
- 19 September – A National Day of Mourning occurs in Jamaica to mourn the death of Elizabeth II, Queen of Jamaica.
- 19 September – Governor-General Patrick Allen and Prime Minister Andrew Holness attend the funeral of Elizabeth II in London.
- 2 October – Memorial services take place in parishes throughout Jamaica to mark the death of Elizabeth II, Queen of Jamaica.

== Deaths ==
- 1 February – Easton McMorris, cricketer (born 1935)
- 3 March – Denroy Morgan, reggae musician (born 1945)
- 30 March – Nathaniel Ian Wynter, musician (born 1954)
- 11 May – Barbara Gloudon, author (born 1935)
- 23 May – Francis Tulloch, MP (born 1940)
- 4 July – Mona Hammond, actress (born 1931)
- 3 August – Roy Hackett, civil rights activist (born 1928)
- 11 August – Marco Brown, politician (born 1927/28)
- 23 August – Winston Stona, actor (born 1940)
- 8 September – Elizabeth II, Queen of Jamaica (born 1926)
