= 2023 in Jamaica =

- Decades: 2000s; 2010s; 2020s
- See also: Other events of 2023; Timeline of Jamaican history

Events in the year 2023 in Jamaica.

== Incumbents ==
- Monarch: Charles III
- Governor-General: Patrick Allen
- Prime Minister: Andrew Holness
- Chief Justice: Bryan Sykes

== Events ==
Ongoing — COVID-19 pandemic in Jamaica

- 1 February –
  - Jamaican Prime Minister Andrew Holness says that his government is willing to send troops to Haiti as part of a "multinational security assistance deployment".
  - Jamaica implements the Road Traffic Act 2018 and a digitised Traffic Ticket Management System; pre-2018 tickets are nullified, and points for later tickets are expunged if paid.
- 22 March – PM Andrew Holness announces the Constitutional Reform Committee to guide Jamaica’s transition to a republic.
- 6 May – Coronation of Charles III as King of Jamaica and the other Commonwealth realms. Governor-General Patrick Allen and Lady Allen attend the ceremony in London.
- 26-28 May – The Calabash International Literary Festival is held in Treasure Beach, St. Elizabeth, for its 15th staging.
- 12-16 July – USA South wins the RAN Women’s Rugby Championship in Kingston, beating Trinidad and Tobago in the final; Mexico take bronze.
- 17-26 November – Jamaica competes at the 2023 Parapan American Games in Santiago, Chile, with 3 athletes in 2 sports; the flagbearers are Theodor Thomas and Asoysona Campbell, and the team wins no medals.
- 7 December – Marubeni executives distribute care packages to students at Drews Avenue and Mountain View primary schools in Kingston.

== Deaths ==
- 4 January – Richard Bernal, diplomat and economist.
