= 2021 in Jamaica =

- Decades: 2000s; 2010s; 2020s
- See also: Other events of 2021; Timeline of Jamaican history

Events in the year 2021 in Jamaica.

== Incumbents ==
- Monarch: Elizabeth II
- Governor-General: Patrick Allen
- Prime Minister: Andrew Holness
- Chief Justice: Bryan Sykes

== Events ==
Ongoing — COVID-19 pandemic in Jamaica

- 5 February – Drought, increases in local demand, and a drop in the number of farmers all contribute to a marijuana shortage. The COVID-19 pandemic and related curfew means that farmers have a difficult time in irrigating their fields.
- 17 February – The Inter-American Commission on Human Rights releases a report that says the Jamaican government violated the rights of a gay man and a lesbian in 2011.
- 15 June – A drug smuggler has been jailed after more than £270,000 worth of cocaine was discovered hidden in food packets.

== Deaths ==
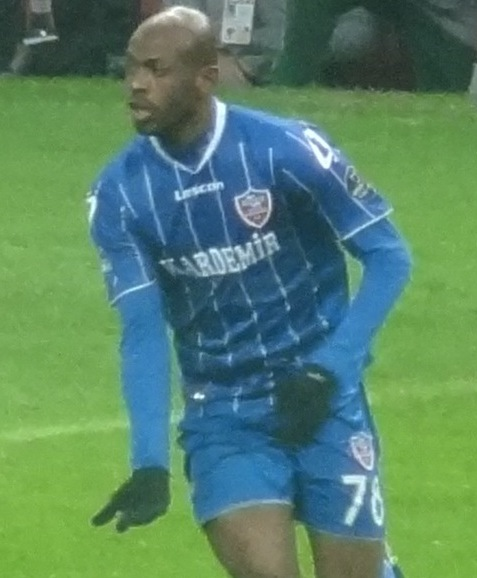
Luton Shelton

- 4 January – Gordon "Butch" Stewart, hotelier (b. 1941).
- 9 January – Vivalyn Latty-Scott, 82, West Indies cricketer (Jamaica women's national cricket team, West Indies women's cricket team) and coach.
- 18 January
  - Easton Lee, 89, Anglican priest, playwright and broadcaster.
  - Yvonne Sterling, 65, reggae vocalist; stroke.
- 20 January – Ronnie Nasralla, 90, record producer (Byron Lee and the Dragonaires).
- 22 January – Luton Shelton, 35, footballer (Harbour View, Vålerenga, national team); complications from amyotrophic lateral sclerosis.
- 7 February – Leslie Laing, 95, athlete, Olympic champion (1952).
- 17 February – U-Roy, 78, reggae singer.
- 2 March – Bunny Wailer, 73, farmer reggae singer-songwriter and percussionist (The Wailers); complications from a stroke.
