= 2024 in Jamaica =

- Decades: 2000s; 2010s; 2020s
- See also: Other events of 2024; Timeline of Jamaican history

Events in the year 2024 in Jamaica.

== Incumbents ==
- Monarch: Charles III
- Governor-General: Patrick Allen
- Prime Minister: Andrew Holness
- Chief Justice: Bryan Sykes

== Events ==
=== February ===
- February 28 – 2024 Jamaican local elections

=== March ===
- March 31 – Haitian crisis: Canada deploys 70 members of its armed forces to Jamaica to train peacekeepers for a future intervention in Haiti.

=== April ===
- April 23 – Jamaica becomes the 140th UN member state to recognize the State of Palestine.

=== June ===
- 28 June – The Financial Action Task Force removes Jamaica from its "gray list" of countries not fully complying with measures to combat money laundering and terrorism financing.

=== July ===
- 4 July – Category 4 Hurricane Beryl causes a six- to nine-feet storm surge and fierce winds along Jamaica's southern coast, killing at least one person there before tracking to the Cayman Islands.
- 26 July–11 August – Jamaica at the 2024 Summer Olympics

=== August ===
- 11 August – Eight people are killed and nine others are injured in a mass shooting in Clarendon Parish. Six people are arrested.

=== September ===
- 10 September – The government announces that it would deploy 24 police and military personnel to Haiti to help in operations against the country's gang war. The contingent arrives in Haiti on 12 September.

=== October ===
- 21 October – Five people are killed in a shooting at a football match in Pleasant Heights, Kingston.

=== November ===
- 25 November – Five people are killed in a shooting in Saint Andrew Parish.

== Holidays ==
- 1 January - New Year's Day
- 14 February – Ash Wednesday
- 29 March – Good Friday
- 1 April - Easter Monday
- 23 May - Labour Day
- 1 August - Emancipation Day
- 6 August - Independence Day
- 21 October – National Heroes Day
- 25 December – Christmas Day
- 26 December – Boxing Day

== Deaths ==
- 19 January – Pluto Shervington, 73, reggae musician.
- 3 February – Aston "Family Man" Barrett, 77, musician (Bob Marley and the Wailers).
- 25 February – Peter "Peetah" Morgan, 46, reggae singer (Morgan Heritage).
- 4 March – B. B. Seaton, 79, singer (The Gaylads), songwriter and record producer.
- 19 April – Princess Lawes, 79, politician.

== See also ==
- 2020s
- 2024 Atlantic hurricane season
- 2024 in the Caribbean
