= 2025 in Jamaica =

- Decades: 2000s; 2010s; 2020s
- See also: Other events of 2025; Timeline of Jamaican history

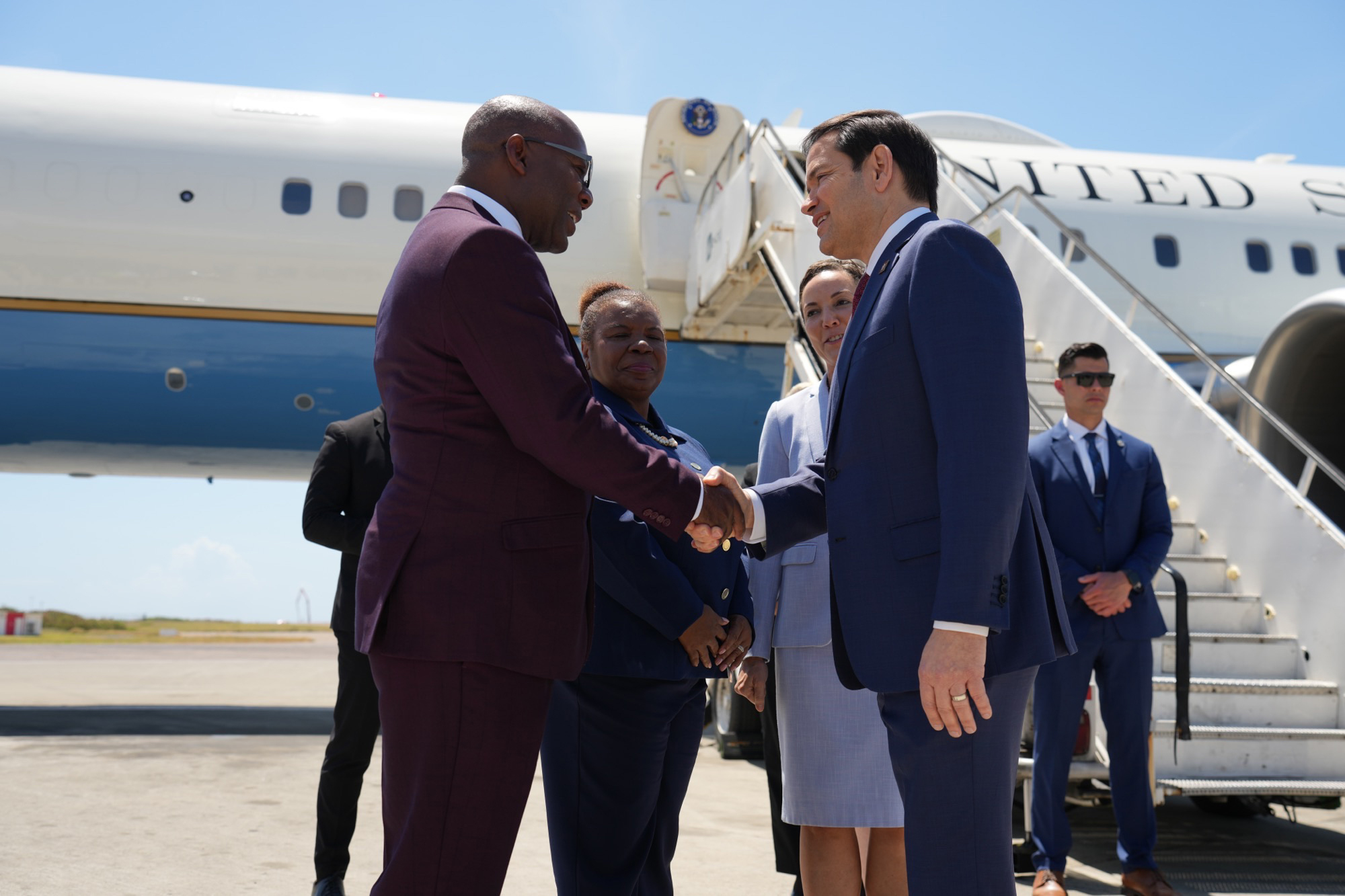
Secretary Marco Rubio is greeted by Ambassador Esmond Reid, Ambassador Sharon Miller, Foreign Minister Kamina Johnson Smith as he arrives at Norman Manley International Airport in Kingston, Jamaica, March 26. 2025.

Events in the year 2025 in Jamaica.

== Incumbents ==
- Monarch: Charles III
- Governor-General: Patrick Allen
- Prime Minister: Andrew Holness
- Chief Justice: Bryan Sykes

== Events ==
=== January ===
- 22 January – Othneil “Thickman” Lobban, the leader of the One Order gang, is killed in a police operation in Spanish Town, sparking riots.

=== March ===
- 27 March – ADHD and cervical cancer are added to the National Health Fund coverage.

=== June ===
- 10 June – The European Union removes Jamaica from its list of high risk jurisdictions for money laundering and terrorism financing.

=== July ===
- 12 July – Port Royal is designated as a World Heritage Site by UNESCO.
- 21 July – Five people suspected of involvement in a murder plot are shot dead by police in Saint Andrew Parish.

=== September ===
- 3 September – 2025 Jamaican general election: Prime Minister Andrew Holness is elected to a third term after his Jamaica Labour Party wins 34 of 63 seats in Parliament, followed by the opposition People's National Party with 29 seats.

=== October ===
- 5 October – Five people are killed in a shooting in Linstead.
- 7 October – Seven people are injured in a shooting in Kingston.
- 28 October – Hurricane Melissa makes landfall over Westmoreland Parish, killing at least 45 people and leaving 15 others missing.

=== December ===
- 1 December – Jamaica receives a joint aid package valued at $6.7 billion from the CAF – Development Bank of Latin America and the Caribbean, the International Monetary Fund, the World Bank, the Caribbean Development Bank and the Inter-American Development Bank as part of recovery efforts following Hurricane Melissa.

== Holidays ==
- 1 January – New Year's Day
- 5 March – Ash Wednesday
- 18 April – Good Friday
- 21 April – Easter Monday
- 23 May – Labour Day
- 1 August – Emancipation Day
- 6 August – Independence Day
- 20 October – National Heroes Day
- 25 December – Christmas Day
- 26 December – Boxing Day

== Deaths ==
- 8 June – Uriah Rennie, 65, football referee.
- 24 November – Jimmy Cliff, 81, Hall of Fame reggae singer-songwriter ("Many Rivers to Cross", "You Can Get It If You Really Want") and actor (The Harder They Come).
- 2 December – Ena Collymore-Woodstock, 108, barrister and magistrate.

== See also ==
- 2025 in the Caribbean
