= Irvino English =

Jamaican footballer (1977–2020)

Personal information
- Date of birth: 23 October 1977
- Date of death: 27 February 2020 (aged 42)
- Place of death: Kingston, Jamaica
- Height: 1.81 m (5 ft 11 in)
- Position: Midfielder

Senior career*
Years	Team	Apps	(Gls)
1999–2011	Waterhouse		

International career
1999–2002	Jamaica	7	(2)
- * Club domestic league appearances and goals

Irvino English (23 October 1977 – 27 February 2020) was a Jamaican footballer who played as a midfielder.

== Club career ==
English spent his entire club career with Waterhouse, playing for them between 1999 and 2011. During the 2006-07 season, he finished as the league's top goal scorer with 18 goals.

== International career ==
English earned seven caps for the Jamaica national team between 1999 and 2002, which included one FIFA World Cup qualifying match.

== Death ==
English was murdered on 27 February 2020.
