= COVID-19 pandemic in Jamaica =

- Disease: COVID-19
- Pathogen: SARS-CoV-2
- Location: Jamaica
- First outbreak: Wuhan, Hubei, China (global pandemic)
- Index case: Kingston, Jamaica
- Arrival date: 10 March 2020 (6 years, 7 months, 2 weeks and 5 days)
- Confirmed cases: 157,694
- Recovered: 150,532
- Deaths: 3,634

Government website
- Ministry of Health and Wellness

The COVID-19 pandemic was confirmed in Jamaica on 10 March 2020. This was during the 2019–2020 dengue fever epidemic that affected Latin America and the Caribbean.

On 11 January 2022, Jamaica overtook China in terms of the number of confirmed cases.

== Background ==
The COVID-19 pandemic in Jamaica is part of the COVID-19 pandemic of COVID-19, an infectious disease caused by SARS-CoV-2. On 12 January, the World Health Organization (WHO) confirmed that a novel coronavirus was the cause of a respiratory illness in a cluster of people in Wuhan City, Hubei Province, China, who had initially come to the attention of the WHO on 31 December 2019. Unlike SARS outbreak of 2003, the case fatality ratio for COVID-19 has been much lower, but the transmission has been significantly greater, with a significant total death toll.

== Timeline ==
Cases

Deaths

=== January and February 2020 ===
The government announced a travel ban between China and Jamaica, with all people entering Jamaica from China subject to immediate quarantine for at least 14 days, and anyone who was allowed to land and shows symptoms of the virus put in immediate isolation. In keeping with the new policy, 19 Chinese nationals who arrived at the Norman Manley International Airport on the evening of 31 January were denied entry, quarantined, and put on a flight back to China on 1 February.

=== March 2020 ===
On 10 March, the Ministry of Health and Wellness (MoHW) confirmed the first case in Jamaica, a female patient who arrived from the United Kingdom on 4 March. The health minister reported that the patient has been in isolation since 9 March after showing respiratory symptoms. Following the update, the travel ban imposed was expanded to include France, Germany, and Spain. On 11 March, the country's health minister Christopher Tufton confirmed the second "imported" case of COVID-19. On 13 March, the country announced six additional cases – including the father and another female patient of the first patient. Later that day, the government announced that the community of Bull Bay — where the funeral attended by the first patient took place — was placed under quarantine for 14 days. With four of the cases involving patients travelling through or from the United Kingdom, the country's foreign minister Kamina Johnson-Smith announced that the travel ban would be expanded to include the United Kingdom. On 15 March, the Ministry of Health and Wellness (MoHW) confirmed that 19 suspected cases were reported and the patients tested. Of the 19 suspected cases, only two patients were confirmed as having the virus - one coming from Trinidad and Tobago and the other who had "contact tracing from the index case". In the same update, the Ministry confirmed that there were twenty-seven patients in isolation facilities and that Patients 1 and 2 no longer exhibit any symptoms. On 16 March, the Ministry of Health and Wellness (MoHW) and the Office of the Prime Minister (OPM) reported that there were five preliminary confirmed cases. Later that day, the government confirmed that only two of the five reported cases tested positive for COVID-19. In response to the increase in cases, the government announced further social distancing measures such as imposed remote work directives, the banning of all mass gatherings of more than 20 people, and the shuttering of bars, restaurants, sporting events, et cetera. On 17 March, the Ministry of Health and Wellness (MoHW) and the Office of the Prime Minister (OPM) confirmed another case - someone who attended the same funeral as Patient 1. On 18 March, the Chief Medical Officer of Jamaica confirmed the first COVID-19 death in the country. At the same press conference, the health ministry confirmed two additional cases. Between 19 and 31 March, the Ministry of Health and Wellness (MoHW) confirmed an additional 22 cases bringing the total to 38 - including the first patient under the age of 18 years - with three having travel history in United States. Additionally, the health ministry announced the second coronavirus related death, a previously recovering patient who was determined to have died from cardiac arrest; and, the second recovered patient who has since been released from hospital. Of the two new cases, one was identified through contact tracing and was found to have been near two patients. The government also reported the recovery of the first patient in Jamaica.

==== Government response ====
In light of these and other developments, the government announced the following measures:

- On 12 March: the closing of all primary and secondary schools for fourteen days.
- On 13 March: the invocation of the special powers under the Disaster Risk Management Act, the Emergency Powers Act and the Public Health Act to combat further spread of COVID-19. The Prime Minister also announced that the country would be seeking 100 Cuban nurses and recruiting retired medical professionals to help with the pandemic response.
- On 17 March: the imposition of remote work directives to non-essential workers.
- On 20 March:
  - the closure of all ports of entry to incoming traffic for a period of 14 days, effective 21 March; and,
  - the recruitment of final year medical students and retired medical practitioners to "support clinical and surveillance activities".
- On 23 March:
  - the imposition of a stay-at-home order for all Jamaican citizens and residents 75 years and older for a period of 14 days, effective 25 March;
  - the imposition of mandatory work-from-home orders for all public sector workers 65-years and older;
  - the imposition of a mandatory 14-days quarantine order for all persons who entered the country on 18 March onwards.; and,
  - the continued closure of schools closures until the end of the Easter term (8 April);
- On 25 March: the institution of the multi-billion dollar COVID-19 Allocation of Resources for Employees (CARE) Programme which aims to provided financial assistance to workers and business affected by the pandemic. The programme became operational on 9 April.
- On 30 March: the imposition of an island-wide curfew, from 1 April to 8 April.

=== April 2020 ===
Between 1 and 4 April, the Ministry of Health and Wellness (MoHW) confirmed 17 additional cases bringing the total to 55. Six of the cases were from the Corn Piece community in Clarendon and three had a history travel from New York. Additionally, the ministry reported: the recovery of 06 patients bringing the total to 08; and, the death of another patient bringing the death toll to 03.

On 5 April, the Queen of Jamaica addressed the Commonwealth in a televised broadcast, in which she asked people to "take comfort that while we may have more still to endure, better days will return". She added, "we will be with our friends again; we will be with our families again; we will meet again".

Between 5 and 11 April, the Ministry of Health and Wellness (MoHW) confirmed 14 additional cases - including three patients with travel histories from Brazil and New York. With this update, the number of COVID-19 infections stood at 69. Additionally, the ministry reported: the recovery of 05 patients bringing the total to 13; and, the death of another patient bringing the death toll to 04.

Between 12 and 18 April, the Ministry of Health and Wellness (MoHW) confirmed 69 additional cases bringing the number of COVID-19 infections to 173. Additionally, the ministry reported: the recovery of 14 patients bringing the total to 27; and, the death of another patient bringing the death toll to 05. The majority of the cases are related to a call centre in Portmore, Saint Catherine. In response, the Government of Jamaica announced a week long lockdown for the parish of Saint Catherine. The health ministry announced that one of its staff tested positive for the novel coronavirus; and, that its head offices will be closed on 17 April for cleaning and that staff (including, Permanent Secretary Mr. Dunstan Bryan) ordered to home quarantine. This week also saw the largest increase in daily confirmed cases to date.

Between 19 and 25 April, the Ministry of Health and Wellness (MoHW) confirmed 132 additional cases bringing the number of COVID-19 infections to 305. Additionally, the ministry reported: the recovery of 01 patient bringing the total to 28; and, the death of 02 patients bringing the death toll to 07. To date, 165 out of 305 cases are linked to the call centre workplace cluster.

Between 26 and 30 April, the Ministry of Health and Wellness (MoHW) confirmed 117 additional cases bringing the number of COVID-19 infections to 422. Additionally, the ministry reported: the recovery of another patient bringing the total to 29; and, the death of another patient bringing the death toll to 08. The health ministry this week announced an investigation into the death of a young mother who died from complications from childbirth after being reportedly turned away from several public and private hospitals owing her showing symptoms of COVID-19. To date, 257 cases have been directly and indirectly linked to the call centre workplace cluster. This week also marked the largest increase in daily confirmed cases to date, overtaking the previous record of 32 new cases.

==== Government response ====
In light of these and other developments, the government announced the following measures:

- On 3 April:
  - the issuing of an order to the Passport, Immigration and Citizenship Agency to block 4500 individuals (who arrived between 18 and 24 March) from leaving the island, after said individuals failed to report to quarantine as required under the Disaster Risk Management Act.;
  - the receipt of 25 additional ventilators by 1 May increasing the number of ventilators in the island to 105. The prime minister and the foreign minister both indicated that a number of the ventilators, N95 masks, other medical equipment and non-medical support are being obtained through donations from international partners - including the European Union, South Korea, the People's Republic of China and the International Atomic Energy Agency.
- On 5 April: the launching of a telethon, by the culture minister, aimed at raising US$10 million to fund the government's COVID-19 response.
- On 6 April: the issuing of guidelines on the usage of masks following similar announcements by the USCDC and the World Health Organization.
- On 8 April:
  - the extension of the nightly curfew in place to 21 April;
  - the extension of stay-at-home orders and remote work orders, until 21 April; and,
  - the imposition of a masks-wearing mandate for some class of persons and strongly advised for other Jamaicans. Additionally, Prime Minister Holness announced that schools in Jamaica will remain closed until 22 April; and, that the government is considering controlled re-entry of Jamaican expatriates.
- On 9 April: the launching of COVID-19 Allocation of Resources for Employees (CARE) Programme.
- On 13 April:
  - the consideration of new protocols to facilitate the controlled re-entry of Jamaicans when possible, contingent on quarantine and isolation capacity, among other variables, pending the full re-opening of our borders to passenger traffic. The joint statement by the foreign and national security ministries followed reports of Jamaicans workers on the Marella Discovery 2 cruise ship being denied entry into the country when the ship was in the country's territorial waters.; and,
  - the launching and deployment of mobile testing units.
- On 14 April: the imposition of a complete lockdown for the parish of Saint Catherine for seven days in light of the outbreak at the Alorica call centre in Portmore, Saint Catherine. Included in this parish-wide lockdown are all employees in the business process outsourcing sector (classified as essential workers in previous orders from the Government) who live and/or work at call centres in the parish.
- On 16 April:
  - the beginning of discussions with umbrella groups to ensure compliance of business entities in relation to applications for individual assistance under the Supporting Employees with Transfer of Cash (SET) component of the $10-billion COVID-19 Allocation of Resources for Employees (CARE) programme. The finance minister added that the collaboration was "to ensure that their former employees or their employees whom they have laid off can be verified, and by being verified they can be in receipt of their SET cash grant".; and,
  - the reviewing of the application and disbursement of funds from the COVID-19 Allocation of Resources for Employees (CARE) programme, by the Office of the Auditor General.
- On 17 April: the imposition a six-month moratorium on the payment for licences and of fees by entities in the tourism sector (resulting in JMD$9.7 million in lost revenue for the government). The tourism minister also confirmed that all 160,000 persons directly employed by the tourism sector would benefit from the government's stimulus package.
- On 20 April: the tightening of the previously loosened island-wide curfew, effective 22 April. This was followed by the extension of the Saint Catherine lockdown on 21 April for a further seven days.
- On 21 April:
  - the closure of all the business process outsourcing (BPO) centres on the island for a period of 14 days (effective 22 April), in response to the workplace outbreak at one such BPO call centres which has been credited for the sharp increase in confirmed cases of COVID-19.;
  - the imposition of a mask-wearing mandate for all Jamaicans in public; and,
  - the issuing of a declaration by the agriculture ministry to mitigate the financial challenges being endured by the country's farmers. Of these measures were the delivery and sale of farm fresh produce to Portmore, Saint Catherine which was under lockdown.
- On 23 April: the receipt of JMD$4 million from Jamaica Cooperative Credit Union League towards the government's drive to raise funds for the purchasing from personal protective equipment.
- On 24 April: the suspension of dividend payments, by the country's central bank (the Bank of Jamaica), during the 2020 financial year.
- On 27 April: the extension of a quarantine mandate of employees of the call centre involved in the workplace outbreak.

=== May 2020 ===
Between 1 and 2 May, the Ministry of Health and Wellness (MoHW) confirmed an additional 41 cases bringing the total to 463. Of the new patients, twenty (20) patients are directly or indirectly linked to the workplace outbreak in Portmore, Saint Catherine. Additionally, the ministry reported: the recovery of 04 patient bringing the total to 33; and, no change in the death toll.

Between 3 and 9 May, the Ministry of Health and Wellness (MoHW) confirmed an additional 45 cases bringing the total to 498. Additionally, the ministry reported: the recovery of 45 patients bringing the total to 78; and, the death of another patient bring that the death toll to 09.

Between 10 and 16 May, the Ministry of Health and Wellness (MoHW) confirmed an additional 19 cases bringing the total to 517. Additionally, the ministry reported: the recovery of 43 patients bringing the recovery total to 121; and, that the death toll remained at 09.

Between 17 and 23 May, the Ministry of Health and Wellness (MoHW) confirmed an additional 33 cases bringing the total to 550. Additionally, the ministry reported: the recovery of 79 patients bringing the recovery total to 200; and, that the death toll remained at 09.

Between 24 and 31 May, the Ministry of Health and Wellness (MoHW) confirmed an additional 36 cases bringing the total to 586. Additionally, the ministry reported: the recovery of 26 patients bringing the total to 226; and, the death of another patient bring that the death toll to 09. With this new update, the recovery rate stood at 50.3%.

==== Government response ====
In light of these and other developments, the government announced the following measures:

- On 7 May: the quarantining of several communities in the parish of Saint Mary.
- On 19 May: the rescinding of remote work orders, effective 31 May.
- On 31 May: the publication of new workplace protocols.

=== June 2020 ===
Between 1 and 6 June, the Ministry of Health and Wellness (MoHW) confirmed 10 additional cases bringing the number of COVID-19 infections to 596. Additionally, the ministry reported: the recovery of 93 patients bringing the total to 596; and, the death of another patient bringing the death toll to 10. By the end of this week, the recovery rate was 67.79% and the fatality rate was 1.68%.

Between 7 and 13 June, the Ministry of Health and Wellness (MoHW) confirmed 19 additional cases bringing the number of COVID-19 infections to 615. Additionally, the ministry reported: the recovery of 16 patients bringing the total to 420; and, no change in the death toll. By the end of this week, the recovery rate was 68.29% and the fatality rate was 1.63%.

Between 14 and 20 June, the Ministry of Health and Wellness (MoHW) confirmed 42 additional cases bringing the number of COVID-19 infections to 657. Of the new patients, 17 were male and 25 were female; and, they all were between the ages of 4 and 72-years. Additionally, the ministry reported: the recovery of 42 patients bringing the total to 462. By the end of this week, the recovery rate was 70.32% and the fatality rate was 1.52%.

Between 21 and 27 June, the Ministry of Health and Wellness (MoHW) confirmed 33 additional cases bringing the number of COVID-19 infections to 690. Of the new patients, 19 were male and 25 were female; and, they all were between the ages of 6 and 87-years. The details of a further two patients were unknown. Additionally, the ministry reported: the recovery of 90 patients bringing the total to 552. By the end of this week, the recovery rate was 80.00% and the fatality rate was 1.45%.

Between 28 and 30 June, the Ministry of Health and Wellness (MoHW) confirmed 12 additional cases bringing the number of COVID-19 infections to 702. Of the new patients, 6 were male and 6 were female; and, they all were between the ages of 22 and 71-years. Additionally, the ministry reported: the recovery of another patient bringing the total to 553. By the end of this week, the recovery rate was 78.77% and the fatality rate was 1.42%.

==== Government response ====
In light of these and other developments, the government announced the following measures:

- On 1 June: the phased re-opening of the country's borders, in keeping with the Controlled Re-Entry Programme.
- On 25 June: the placement of West Kingston under "community surveillance" following a rise in cases.
- On 26 June: the placement of the community of Norwood, Saint James under "community surveillance" following a rise in cases.

=== July 2020 ===
Between 1 and 4 July, the Ministry of Health and Wellness (MoHW) confirmed 26 additional cases bringing the number of COVID-19 infections to 728. Of the new patients, 15 were male and 6 were female; and, they all were between the ages of 22 and 71-years. The details of one patient was not published. Additionally, the ministry reported: the recovery of 16 patient, bringing the total to 569. By the end of this week, the recovery rate was 78.16% and the fatality rate was 1.37%.

Between 5 and 11 July, the Ministry of Health and Wellness (MoHW) confirmed 30 additional cases bringing the number of COVID-19 infections to 758. Of the new patients, 15 were male and 15 were female; and, they were between the ages of 1 and 65-years. Additionally, the ministry reported: the recovery of 46 patients bringing the total to 615. By the end of this week, the recovery rate was 81.13% and the fatality rate was 1.32%.

Between 12 and 18 July, the Ministry of Health and Wellness (MoHW) confirmed 16 additional cases bringing the number of COVID-19 infections to 774. Of the new patients, 9 were male and 7 were female; and, they all were between the ages of 08-months and 69-years. Additionally, the ministry reported: the recovery of 64 patients bringing the total to 679. By the end of this week, the recovery rate was 87.73% and the fatality rate was 1.29%.

Between 19 and 25 June, the Ministry of Health and Wellness (MoHW) confirmed 63 additional cases bringing the number of COVID-19 infections to 837. Of the new patients, 32 were male and 31 were female; and, they were between the ages of 22 and 71-years. Additionally, the ministry reported: the recovery of 32 patients bringing the total to 711. By the end of this week, the recovery rate was 84.95% and the fatality rate was 1.19%.

Between 26 and 31 July, the Ministry of Health and Wellness (MoHW) confirmed 12 additional cases bringing the number of COVID-19 infections to 702. Of the new patients, 17 were male and 24 were female; and, they all were between the ages of 03-months and 77-years. Additionally, the ministry reported: the recovery of another patients bringing the total to 553. By the end of this week, the recovery rate was 82.69% and the fatality rate was 1.14%.

=== August 2020 ===
Between 1 and 7 August, the Ministry of Health and Wellness (MoHW) confirmed 109 additional cases bringing the total to 987. Of the new cases: 29 were imported on flights from the United States, the Dominican Republic and Nicaragua; 32 were deemed to be contacts of previously confirmed cases or other imported cases; and, 48 patients had their modes of transmission placed under investigation/undetermined. The patients - 56 females and 53 males who range between 07-months and 88-years - provided addresses in Kingston and Saint Andrew, Saint Catherine, Clarendon, Manchester, Saint James, Saint Ann, Saint Mary, Portland and Saint Thomas parishes. During this week long period, the health ministry also reported: the recovery and release of 19 patients bringing the recovery total to 745; one COVID-19 related deaths, bringing the death toll to 13; and the repatriation of three more patients, bringing number of repatriated patients to 52.

Between 8 and 14 August, the Ministry of Health and Wellness (MoHW) confirmed 295 additional cases bringing the total to 1,082. Of the new cases: 22 were imported; 39 were deemed to be contacts of previously confirmed cases or other imported cases; and, 34 patients had their modes of transmission placed under investigation/undetermined. The plurality of these cases were connected to a religious service in Saint Thomas parish. The patients, who included 49 females and 46 males ranging between 02-months and 88-years, provided addresses in Kingston and Saint Andrew, Saint Catherine, Clarendon, Westmoreland, Saint James, Saint Ann, Saint Mary, Portland and Saint Thomas parishes. During this week long period, the health ministry also reported: the recovery and release of 16 patients bringing the recovery total to 761; one COVID-19 related death, bringing the death toll to 14; and the repatriation of ten more patients, bringing number of repatriated patients to 62.

Between 15 and 21 August, the Ministry of Health and Wellness (MoHW) confirmed 264 additional cases bringing the total to 1346. Of the new cases: 43 were imported; 50 were deemed to be contacts of previously confirmed cases or other imported cases; 166 patients had their modes of transmission placed under investigation/undetermined; and 05 patients were determined to be local transmission not epidemiologically linked. Of the new cases this week, 29 were part of a backlog from July. The plurality of these cases were connected Kingston and Saint Andrew parishes. The patients, who included 130 females and 134 males ranging between 04-months and 89-years, provided addresses in Kingston and Saint Andrew, Saint Catherine, Clarendon, Manchester, Saint Elizabeth, Westmoreland, Saint James, Trelawny, Saint Ann, Saint Mary, Portland and Saint Thomas parishes. During this week long period, the health ministry also reported: the recovery and release of 27 patients bringing the recovery total to 788; two COVID-19 related death, bringing the death toll to 16; and the repatriation of nine more patients, bringing number of repatriated patients to 71.

Between 22 and 28 August, the Ministry of Health and Wellness (MoHW) confirmed 665 additional cases bringing the total to 2,011. Of the new cases: 07 were imported; 31 were deemed to be contacts of previously confirmed cases or other imported cases; 626 patients had their modes of transmission placed under investigation/undetermined; and, 01 patient was determined to be of local transmission not epidemiologically linked. The patients, who included 359 females and 306 males ranging between 04-months and 92-years, provided addresses in all parishes. During this week long period, the health ministry also reported: the recovery and release of 100 patients bringing the recovery total to 888; 03 COVID-19 related deaths bringing the official death toll to 19; 01 "coincidental" death, which for the purposes of reporting will not be including in the official death toll; and that the number repatriated patients remained at 71. Three of the highest single day increase in cases were recorded during this time period.

Between 29 and 31 August, the Ministry of Health and Wellness (MoHW) confirmed 449 additional cases bringing the total to 2,459. Of the new cases: 08 were imported; 18 were deemed to be contacts of previously confirmed cases or other imported cases; 322 patients had their modes of transmission placed under investigation/undetermined; and, 01 patient was determined to be of local transmission not epidemiologically linked. The patients included: 230 females, 190 males and 29 whose sex has not been determined; all of whom range between 13-days and 90-years and provided addresses in all parishes. During this 48-hour period, the health ministry also reported: the recovery and release of 02 patients bringing the recovery total to 890; 02 COVID-19 related deaths bringing the official death toll to 21; and that the number of repatriated patients and coincidental deaths stood at 71 and 01 respectively. With 245 newly confirmed cases, 30 August marked the highest single day increase in cases.

==== Government response ====
In light of these and other developments, the government announced the following measures:

- On 6 August: the quarantining of the community of Sandy Bay, Clarendon for 14-days, following a rise in infections.
- On 9 August: the quarantining of the communities of Lower Summit, Church Corner and Bamboo River in Saint Thomas for 14-days, following a rise in infections.
- On 20 August: the quarantining of the communities of Albion and Seaforth in Saint Thomas for 14-days, following a rise in infections.

=== September 2020 ===
Between 1 and 5 September, the Ministry of Health and Wellness (MoHW) confirmed 565 additional cases bringing the total to 3,024. Of the new cases: 14 were deemed to be contacts of previously confirmed cases or other imported cases; 549 patients had their modes of transmission placed under investigation/undetermined; and, 02 patients were determined to be of local transmission not epidemiologically linked. The patients included: 291 females and 264 males all of whom range between 08-months and 97-years and provided addresses in all parishes. During this five day period, the health ministry also reported: the recovery and release of 60 patients bringing the recovery total to 950; 11 COVID-19 related deaths bringing the official death toll to 32; and that the number of repatriated patients and coincidental deaths remained at 71 and 03 respectively. Additionally, cause of death for 03 COVID-19 patients were being investigated.

Between 6 and 12 September, the Ministry of Health and Wellness (MoHW) confirmed 747 additional cases bringing the total to 3,771. Of the new cases: 01 was imported, 02 were deemed to be contacts of previously confirmed cases or other imported cases; and, 744 patients had their modes of transmission placed under investigation/undetermined. The patients included: 398 females, 292 males and 57 patients whose sex classification had not been determined; all of whom range between 04-months and 95-years and provided addresses in all parishes. During this week-long period, the health ministry also reported: the recovery and release of 199 patients bringing the recovery total to 1149; 10 COVID-19 related deaths bringing the official death toll to 42; and that the number of repatriated patients remained at 71. By the end of the week, the number of coincidental deaths stood at 04 and the cause of death for 05 COVID-19 patients were being investigated.

Between 13 and 19 September, the Ministry of Health and Wellness (MoHW) confirmed 1217 additional cases bringing the total to 4,988. Of the new cases: 02 were imported, 17 were deemed to be contacts of previously confirmed cases or other imported cases; and, 1198 patients had their modes of transmission placed under investigation/undetermined. The patients included: 398 females, 292 males and an unspecified number of patients whose sex classification had not been determined; all of whom range between 79-days and 104-years and provided addresses in all parishes. During this week-long period, the health ministry also reported: the recovery and release of 201 patients bringing the recovery total to 1350; 25 COVID-19 related deaths bringing the official death toll to 67; and that the number of repatriated patients increased to 73. By the end of the week, the number of coincidental deaths stood at 04 and the cause of death for 05 COVID-19 patients were being investigated.

Between 20 and 26 September, the Ministry of Health and Wellness (MoHW) confirmed 1,029 additional cases bringing the total to 6,017. Of the new cases: 03 were imported, 04 were deemed to be contacts of previously confirmed cases or other imported cases; 1,018 patients had their modes of transmission placed under investigation/undetermined; and, 04 patients were determined to be of local transmission not epidemiologically linked. The patients included: 505 females, 515 males and an unspecified number of patients whose sex classification had not been determined; all of whom range between 01-month and 95-years and provided addresses in all parishes. During this week-long period, the health ministry also reported: the recovery and release of 356 patients bringing the recovery total to 1,706; 22 COVID-19 related deaths bringing the official death toll to 89; and that the number of repatriated patients remained 73. By the end of the week, the number of coincidental deaths stood at 04 and the cause of death for 06 COVID-19 patients were being investigated.

Between 27 and 30 September, the Ministry of Health and Wellness (MoHW) confirmed 538 additional cases bringing the total to 6,555. Of the new cases: all 538 patients had their modes of transmission placed under investigation/undetermined. The patients included: 315 females, 222 males and one patient whose sex classification had not been determined; all of whom range between 24-days and 96-years and provided addresses in all parishes. During this four day period, the health ministry also reported: the recovery and release of 285 patients bringing the recovery total to 1,991; 22 COVID-19 related deaths bringing the official death toll to 111; and that the number of repatriated patients remained at 73. By the end of the week, the number of coincidental deaths stood at 06 and the cause of death for 11 COVID-19 patients were being investigated.

=== October 2020 ===
Between 1 and 3 October, the Ministry of Health and Wellness (MoHW) confirmed 340 additional cases bringing the total to 6,895. Of the new cases: all 340 patients had their modes of transmission placed under investigation/undetermined. The patients included: 175 females, 164 males and one patient whose sex classification had not been determined; all of whom range between 11-days and 88-years and provided addresses in all parishes. During this three day period, the health ministry also reported: the recovery and release of 469 patients bringing the recovery total to 2,460; 09 COVID-19 related deaths bringing the official death toll to 120; and that the number of repatriated patients remained at 73. After three days, the number of coincidental deaths stood at 09 and the cause of death for 12 COVID-19 patients were being investigated.

Between 4 and 10 October, the Ministry of Health and Wellness (MoHW) confirmed 823 additional cases bringing the total to 7,718. Of the new cases: 02 were imported, 07 were deemed to be contacts of previously confirmed cases or other imported cases; 812 patients had their modes of transmission placed under investigation/undetermined; and, 02 patients were determined to be of local transmission not epidemiologically linked. The patients included: 451 females, 363 males and 09 patients whose sex classification had not been immediately determined; all of whom range between 08-days and 99-years and provided addresses in all parishes. During this week-long period, the health ministry also reported: the recovery and release of 702 patients bringing the recovery total to 3,162; 19 COVID-19 related deaths bringing the official death toll to 139; and that the number of repatriated patients remained 73. By the end of the week, the number of coincidental deaths stood at 10 and the cause of death for 19 COVID-19 patients were being investigated.

Between 11 and 17 October, the Ministry of Health and Wellness (MoHW) confirmed 556 additional cases bringing the total to 8,274. Of the new cases: all 556 patients had their modes of transmission placed under investigation/undetermined. The patients included: 324 females, 227 males and 05 patients whose sex classification had not been immediately determined; all of whom range between 03-months and 96-years and provided addresses in all parishes. During this week-long period, the health ministry also reported: the recovery and release of 697 patients bringing the recovery total to 3,859; 32 COVID-19 related deaths bringing the official death toll to 171; and that the number of repatriated patients remained 73. By the end of the week, the number of coincidental deaths stood at 12 and the cause of death for 24 COVID-19 patients were being investigated.

Between 18 and 24 October, the Ministry of Health and Wellness (MoHW) confirmed 440 additional cases bringing the total to 8,714. Of the new cases: 02 were imported and 438 patients had their modes of transmission placed under investigation/undetermined. The patients included: 236 females, 203 males and 01 patient whose sex classification had not been immediately determined; all of whom range between 06-months and 98-years and provided addresses in all parishes. During this week-long period, the health ministry also reported: the recovery and release of 423 patients bringing the recovery total to 4,282; 17 COVID-19 related deaths bringing the official death toll to 188; and that the number of repatriated patients remained 73. By the end of the week, the number of coincidental deaths stood at 14 and the cause of death for 26 COVID-19 patients were being investigated.

Between 25 and 31 October, the Ministry of Health and Wellness (MoHW) confirmed 417 additional cases bringing the total to 9,131. Of the new cases: 02 were imported; 08 deemed to be contacts of previously confirmed cases or other imported cases; 406 patients had their modes of transmission placed under investigation/undetermined; and, 01 was determined to be of local transmission not epidemiologically linked. The patients included: 230 females, 174 males and 08 patients whose sex classification had not been immediately determined; all of whom range between 35-days and 95-years and provided addresses in all parishes. During this week-long period, the health ministry also reported: the recovery and release of 335 patients bringing the recovery total to 4,617; 20 COVID-19 related deaths and the reclassification of 01 suspicious death bringing the official death toll to 209; and that the number of repatriated patients remained 73. By the end of the week, the number of coincidental deaths stood at 15 and the cause of death for 31 COVID-19 patients were being investigated.

==== Government response ====
In light of these and other developments, the government announced the following measures:

- 14 October: the procurement of Remdesivir for treatment of COVID-19.

=== November 2020 ===
Between 1 and 7 November, the Ministry of Health and Wellness (MoHW) confirmed 375 additional cases bringing the total to 9,506. Of the new cases: 06 deemed to be contacts of previously confirmed cases or other imported cases; 356 patients had their modes of transmission placed under investigation/undetermined; and, 03 were determined to be of local transmission not epidemiologically linked. The patients included: 161 females, 213 males and 1 patient whose sex classification had not been immediately determined; all of whom range between 02 and 92-years and provided addresses in all parishes. During this week-long period, the health ministry also reported: the recovery and release of 317 patients bringing the recovery total to 4,934; 11 COVID-19 related deaths and the reclassification of 01 suspicious death bringing the official death toll to 221; and that the number of repatriated patients remained 73. By the end of the week, the number of coincidental deaths stood at 21 and the cause of death for 31 COVID-19 patients were being investigated.

Between 8 and 14 November, the Ministry of Health and Wellness (MoHW) confirmed 378 additional cases bringing the total to 9,884. Of the new cases: 06 were imported, 13 were deemed to be contacts of previously confirmed cases or other imported cases; and 359 patients had their modes of transmission placed under investigation/undetermined. The patients included: 208 females and 170 males; all of whom range between 01 and 94-years and provided addresses in all parishes. During this week-long period, the health ministry also reported: the recovery and release of 350 patients bringing the recovery total to 5,249; 10 COVID-19 related deaths bringing the official death toll to 231; and that the number of repatriated patients remained 73. By the end of the week, the number of coincidental deaths stood at 25 and the cause of death for 31 COVID-19 patients were being investigated.

Between 15 and 21 November, the Ministry of Health and Wellness (MoHW) confirmed 400 additional cases bringing the total to 10,284. Of the new cases: 04 were imported, 12 were deemed to be contacts of previously confirmed cases or other imported cases; 378 patients had their modes of transmission placed under investigation/undetermined; and, 06 were determined to be of local transmission not epidemiologically linked. The patients included: 207 females and 192 males; all of whom range between 11-months and 90-years and provided addresses in all parishes. During this week-long period, the health ministry also reported: the recovery and release of 257 patients bringing the recovery total to 5,505; 07 COVID-19 related deaths bringing the official death toll to 238; and that the number of repatriated patients remained 73. By the end of the week, the number of coincidental deaths stood at 29 and the cause of death for 33 COVID-19 patients were being investigated.

Between 22 and 30 November, the Ministry of Health and Wellness (MoHW) confirmed 526 additional cases bringing the total to 10,810. Of the new cases: 01 was imported, 39 were deemed to be contacts of previously confirmed cases or other imported cases; 477 patients had their modes of transmission placed under investigation/undetermined; and, 09 were determined to be of local transmission not epidemiologically linked. The patients included: 277 females and 248 males and 01 patient whose sex classification had not been immediately determined; all of whom range between 01 and 94-years and provided addresses in all parishes. During this 09-day period, the health ministry also reported: the recovery and release of 859 patients bringing the recovery total to 6,364; 20 COVID-19 related deaths bringing the official death toll to 258; and that the number of repatriated patients remained 73. By the end of the same period, the number of coincidental deaths stood at 35 and the cause of death for 29 COVID-19 patients were being investigated.

=== December 2020 ===
Between 1 and 5 December, the Ministry of Health and Wellness (MoHW) confirmed 310 additional cases bringing the total to 11,120. Of the new cases: 02 were imported, 17 were deemed to be contacts of previously confirmed cases or other imported cases; 287 patients had their modes of transmission placed under investigation/undetermined; and, 04 were determined to be of local transmission not epidemiologically linked. The patients included: 151 females, 158 males and 01 patient whose sex classification had not been immediately determined; all of whom range between 03-days and 99-years and provided addresses in all parishes. During this 05-day period, the health ministry also reported: the recovery and release of 643 patients bringing the recovery total to 6,998; 07 COVID-19 related deaths bringing the official death toll to 265; and that the number of repatriated patients remained 73. By the end of the same period, the number of coincidental deaths stood at 37 and the cause of death for 31 COVID-19 patients were being investigated.

Between 6 and 12 December, the Ministry of Health and Wellness (MoHW) confirmed 590 additional cases bringing the total to 11,710. Of the new cases: 02 were imported, 11 were deemed to be contacts of previously confirmed cases or other imported cases; and, 569 patients had their modes of transmission placed under investigation/undetermined. The patients included: 310 females, 277 males and 03 patient whose sex classification had not been immediately determined; all of whom range between 04-months and 97-years and provided addresses in all parishes. During this week-long period, the health ministry also reported: the recovery and release of 956 patients bringing the recovery total to 7,954; 08 COVID-19 related deaths bringing the official death toll to 273; and that the number of repatriated patients remained 73. By the end of the week, the number of coincidental deaths stood at 41 and the cause of death for 29 COVID-19 patients were being investigated.

Between 13 and 19 December, the Ministry of Health and Wellness (MoHW) confirmed 514 additional cases bringing the total to 12,224. Of the new cases: 01 was imported, 36 were deemed to be contacts of previously confirmed cases or other imported cases; 469 patients had their modes of transmission placed under investigation/undetermined; and, 08 were determined to be of local transmission not epidemiologically linked. The patients included: 288 females and 226 males; all of whom range between 04-months and 97-years and provided addresses in all parishes. During this week-long period, the health ministry also reported: the recovery and release of 1,012 patients bringing the recovery total to 8,966; 13 COVID-19 related deaths bringing the official death toll to 286; and that the number of repatriated patients remained 73. By the end of the week, the number of coincidental deaths stood at 44 and the cause of death for 28 COVID-19 patients were being investigated.

Between 20 and 26 December, the Ministry of Health and Wellness (MoHW) confirmed 499 additional cases bringing the total to 12,723. Of the new cases: 25 were imported, 04 were deemed to be contacts of previously confirmed cases or other imported cases; 462 patients had their modes of transmission placed under investigation/undetermined; and, 03 were determined to be of local transmission not epidemiologically linked. The patients included: 237 females and 272 males; all of whom range between 35-days and 95-years and provided addresses in all parishes. During this week-long period, the health ministry also reported: the recovery and release of 1,052 patients and the reclassification of a death under investigation case bringing the recovery total to 10,019; 09 COVID-19 related deaths bringing the official death toll to 295; and that the number of repatriated patients remained 73. By the end of the week, the number of coincidental deaths stood at 48 and the cause of death for 25 COVID-19 patients were being investigated.

Between 27 and 31 December, the Ministry of Health and Wellness (MoHW) confirmed 192 additional cases bringing the total to 12,915. Of the new cases: 10 were imported, 05 were deemed to be contacts of previously confirmed cases or other imported cases; and, 177 patients had their modes of transmission placed under investigation/undetermined. The patients included: 104 females and 88 males; all of whom range between 33-days and 95-years and provided addresses in all parishes. During this five-day period, the health ministry also reported: the recovery and release of 513 patients bringing the recovery total to 10,532; 08 COVID-19 related deaths bringing the official death toll to 303; and that the number of repatriated patients remained 73. By the end of said period, the number of coincidental deaths stood at 49 and the cause of death for 24 COVID-19 patients were being investigated.

==== Government response ====
In light of these and other developments, the government announced the following measures:

- On 8 December: the naming of the National COVID-19 Vaccine Commission, tasked with providing guidance and oversight in the development of a national deployment strategy for the introduction of COVID-19 vaccines.
- On 21 December: the imposition of the travel ban from the United Kingdom over concerns surrounding the British variant of the virus.
- On 31 December: the extension of the aforementioned travel ban until 31 January 2020.

=== January 2021 ===
Between 1 and 2 January, the Ministry of Health and Wellness (MoHW) confirmed 134 additional cases bringing the total to 13,049. Of the new cases: 04 were imported (including one previously under investigation); and 131 patients had their modes of transmission placed under investigation/undetermined. The patients included: 84 females and 50 males; all of whom range between 48-days and 91-years and provided addresses in all parishes. During this 02-day period, the health ministry also reported: the recovery and release of 301 patients bringing the recovery total to 10,833; 01 COVID-19 related deaths bringing the official death toll to 304; and that the number of repatriated patients remained 73. By the end of the same period, the number of coincidental deaths stood at 49 and the cause of death for 25 COVID-19 patients were being investigated.

Between 3 and 9 January, the Ministry of Health and Wellness (MoHW) confirmed 499 additional cases bringing the total to 13,548. Of the new cases: 03 were imported, 13 were deemed to be contacts of previously confirmed cases or other imported cases; and 390 patients had their modes of transmission placed under investigation/undetermined. The patients included: 274 females, 223 males and 02 patients whose sex classification had not been immediately determined; all of whom range between 03-months and 98-years and provided addresses in all parishes. During this week-long period, the health ministry also reported: the recovery and release of 596 patients bringing the recovery total to 11,429; 08 COVID-19 related deaths bringing the official death toll to 312; and that the number of repatriated patients remained 73. By the end of the same period, the number of coincidental deaths stood at 50 and the cause of death for 25 COVID-19 patients were being investigated.

Between 10 and 16 January, the Ministry of Health and Wellness (MoHW) confirmed 613 additional cases bringing the total to 14,161. Of the new cases: 06 were imported, 20 were deemed to be contacts of previously confirmed cases or other imported cases, 582 patients had their modes of transmission placed under investigation/undetermined and 05 were determined to be of local transmission not epidemiologically linked. The patients included: 344 females, 279 males and 01 patients whose sex classification had not been immediately determined; all of whom range between 15-days and 93-years and provided addresses in all parishes. During this week-long period, the health ministry also reported: the recovery and release of 280 patients bringing the recovery total to 11,709; 12 COVID-19 related deaths bringing the official death toll to 324; and that the number of repatriated patients remained 73. By the end of the same period, the number of coincidental deaths stood at 55 and the cause of death for 25 COVID-19 patients were being investigated.

Between 17 and 23 January, the Ministry of Health and Wellness (MoHW) confirmed 718 additional cases bringing the total to 14,879. Of the new cases: 01 was imported, 04 were deemed to be contacts of previously confirmed cases or other imported cases, 698 patients had their modes of transmission placed under investigation/undetermined and 15 were determined to be of local transmission not epidemiologically linked. The patients included: 437 females and 281 males; all of whom range between 01-week and 100-years and provided addresses in all parishes. During this week-long period, the health ministry also reported: the recovery and release of 161 patients bringing the recovery total to 11,870; 12 COVID-19 related deaths bringing the official death toll to 336; and that the number of repatriated patients remained 73. By the end of the same period, the number of coincidental deaths stood at 59 and the cause of death for 33 COVID-19 patients were being investigated.

Between 24 and 31 January, the Ministry of Health and Wellness (MoHW) confirmed 899 additional cases bringing the total to 15,778. Of the new cases: 05 were imported, 19 were deemed to be contacts of previously confirmed cases or other imported cases, 874 patients had their modes of transmission placed under investigation/undetermined and none were determined to be of local transmission not epidemiologically linked. The patients included: 505 females, 388 males and 06 patients whose sex classification had not been immediately determined; all of whom range between 02-days and 100-years and provided addresses in all parishes. During this week-long period, the health ministry also reported: the recovery and release of 198 patients bringing the recovery total to 12,068; 16 COVID-19 related deaths bringing the official death toll to 352; and that the number of repatriated patients remained 73. By the end of the same period, the number of coincidental deaths stood at 63 and the cause of death for 34 COVID-19 patients were being investigated.

==== Government response ====
In light of these and other developments, the government announced the following measures:

- On 2 January:
  - the distribution 30,000 antigen test kits and reader machines to six private laboratories, to increase national testing capacity; and,
  - the extension of travel ban from the United Kingdom until 31 January.
- On 15 January: the approval of 129 schools to return to face-to-face learning.

=== February 2021 ===
Between 1 and 6 February, the Ministry of Health and Wellness (MoHW) confirmed 1,307 additional cases bringing the total to 17,085. Of the new cases: 12 were imported, 02 were deemed to be contacts of previously confirmed cases or other imported cases, 1,291 patients had their modes of transmission placed under investigation/undetermined and 02 were determined to be of local transmission not epidemiologically linked. The patients included: 758 females, 547 males and 02 patients whose sex classification had not been immediately determined; all of whom range between 01-day and 99-years and provided addresses in all parishes. During this week-long period, the health ministry also reported: the recovery and release of 203 patients bringing the recovery total to 12,271; and 06 COVID-19 related deaths bringing the official death toll to 358. By the end of the same period, the number of coincidental deaths stood at 66 and the cause of death for 36 COVID-19 patients were being investigated.

Between 7 and 13 February, the Ministry of Health and Wellness (MoHW) confirmed 1,950 additional cases bringing the total to 19,035. Of the new cases: 08 were imported, 04 were deemed to be contacts of previously confirmed cases or other imported cases, 1,933 patients had their modes of transmission placed under investigation/undetermined and 05 were determined to be of local transmission not epidemiologically linked. The patients included: 1,117 females, 828 males and 05 patients whose sex classification had not been immediately determined; all of whom range between 02-days and 103-years and provided addresses in all parishes. During this week-long period, the health ministry also reported: the recovery and release of 332 patients bringing the recovery total to 12,593; and 16 COVID-19 related deaths bringing the official death toll to 374. By the end of the same period, the number of coincidental deaths stood at 71 and the cause of death for 38 COVID-19 patients were being investigated.

Between 14 and 20 February, the Ministry of Health and Wellness (MoHW) confirmed 2,347 additional cases bringing the total to 21,347. Of the new cases: 03 were imported, 2,341 patients had their modes of transmission placed under investigation/undetermined and 03 were determined to be of local transmission not epidemiologically linked. The patients included: 1,117 females, 828 males and 05 patients whose sex classification had not been immediately determined; all of whom range between 01-day and 94-years and provided addresses in all parishes. During this week-long period, the health ministry also reported: the recovery and release of 338 patients bringing the recovery total to 12,931; and 22 COVID-19 related deaths bringing the official death toll to 396. By the end of the same period, the number of coincidental deaths stood at 78 and the cause of death for 48 COVID-19 patients were being investigated.

Between 21 and 28 February, the Ministry of Health and Wellness (MoHW) confirmed 2,217 additional cases bringing the total to 23,263. Of the new cases: 15 were imported and 2,202 patients had their modes of transmission placed under investigation/undetermined. The patients included: 1,183 females, 1,013 males and 21 patients whose sex classification had not been immediately determined; all of whom range between 08-days and 101-years and provided addresses in all parishes. During this eight day period, the health ministry also reported: the recovery and release of 571 patients bringing the recovery total to 13,502; and 29 COVID-19 related deaths bringing the official death toll to 425. By the end of the same period, the number of coincidental deaths stood at 85 and the cause of death for 53 COVID-19 patients were being investigated.

==== Government response ====
In light of these and other developments, the government announced the following measures:

- On 22 February: the allocation of over JM $5bn for the procuring and planned distribution of the COVID-19 vaccine.
- On 25 February: the extension of travel ban from the United Kingdom until 15 March.
- On 27 February: the receipt of medical supplies and equipment from Japan.
- On 28 February: the receipt of COVID-19 vaccine donation from India.

=== March 2021 ===
Between 1 and 6 March, the Ministry of Health and Wellness (MoHW) confirmed 2,427 additional cases bringing the total to 26,026. Of the new cases: 01 was imported, and 2,426 patients had their modes of transmission placed under investigation/undetermined. The patients included: 1,056 females, 1,343 males and 28 patients whose sex classification had not been immediately determined; all of whom range between 15-days and 101-years and provided addresses in all parishes. During this week-long period, the health ministry also reported: the recovery and release of 799 patients bringing the recovery total to 14,301; and 28 COVID-19 related deaths bringing the official death toll to 453. By the end of the same period, the number of coincidental deaths stood at 90 and the cause of death for 57 COVID-19 patients were being investigated. By the end of this week, the recovery rate was 54.95% and the fatality rate was 1.74%.

Between 7 and 13 March, the Ministry of Health and Wellness (MoHW) confirmed 4,473 additional cases bringing the total to 30,499. Of the new cases: 11 were imported, 04 were deemed to be contacts of previously confirmed cases or other imported cases and 4,458 patients had their modes of transmission placed under investigation/undetermined. The patients included: 1,884 females, 2,540 males and 49 patients whose sex classification had not been immediately determined; all of whom range between 04-days and 103-years and provided addresses in all parishes. During this week-long period, the health ministry also reported: the recovery and release of 838 patients bringing the recovery total to 15,139; and 32 COVID-19 related deaths bringing the official death toll to 485. By the end of the same period, the number of coincidental deaths stood at 92 and the cause of death for 57 COVID-19 patients were being investigated. By the end of this week, the recovery rate was 49.64% and the fatality rate was 1.59%.

Between 14 and 20 March, the Ministry of Health and Wellness (MoHW) confirmed 4,839 additional cases bringing the total to 35,338. Of the new cases: 12 were imported, 06 were deemed to be contacts of previously confirmed cases or other imported cases and 4,816 patients had their modes of transmission placed under investigation/undetermined. The patients included: 2,724 females, 2,066 males and 19 patients whose sex classification had not been immediately determined; all of whom range between 01-day and 108-years and provided addresses in all parishes. During this week-long period, the health ministry also reported: the recovery and release of 991 patients bringing the recovery total to 16,130; and 48 COVID-19 related deaths bringing the official death toll to 533. By the end of the same period, the number of coincidental deaths stood at 92 and the cause of death for 71 COVID-19 patients were being investigated. By the end of this week, the recovery rate was 45.64% and the fatality rate was 1.51%.

Between 21 and 27 March, the Ministry of Health and Wellness confirmed 2,889 additional cases bringing the total to 38,227. Of the new cases: 13 were imported, 20 were contacts of previously confirmed cases or other imported cases, 4,816 patients had their modes of transmission placed under investigation/undetermined and 01 was determined to be of local transmission not epidemiologically linked. The patients included: 1,618 females, 1,270 males and 01 patients whose sex classification had not been immediately determined; all of whom range between 02-days and 103-years and provided addresses in all parishes. During this week-long period, the health ministry also reported: the recovery and release of 1,126 patients bringing the recovery total to 17,256; and 35 COVID-19 related deaths bringing the official death toll to 568. By the end of the same period, the number of coincidental deaths stood at 93 and the cause of death for 81 COVID-19 patients were being investigated. By the end of this week, the recovery rate was 45.14% and the fatality rate was 1.49%.

Between 28 and 31 March, the Ministry of Health and Wellness confirmed 1,316 additional cases bringing the total to 39,543. Of the new cases: 25 were imported, 02 were contacts of previously confirmed cases or other imported cases, 1,291 patients had their modes of transmission placed under investigation/undetermined and 01 was determined to be of local transmission not epidemiologically linked. The patients included: 719 females, 591 males and 06 patients whose sex classification had not been immediately determined; all of whom range between 07-days and 98-years and provided addresses in all parishes. During this week-long period, the health ministry also reported: the recovery and release of 528 patients bringing the recovery total to 17,784; and 29 COVID-19 related deaths bringing the official death toll to 597. By the end of the same period, the number of coincidental deaths stood at 100 and the cause of death for 83 COVID-19 patients were being investigated. By the end of this week, the recovery rate was 44.97% and the fatality rate was 1.51%.

==== Government response ====
In light of these and other developments, the government announced the following measures:

- On 4 March: the publication of the Vaccine Implementation Plan outlining the scheduled rollout of the COVID-19 vaccine.
- On 10 March: the commencement of the vaccination programme.
- On 21 March: the introduction of 'lockdown measures' in light of sharp rise in infections.

=== April 2021 ===
Between 1 and 3 April, the Ministry of Health and Wellness confirmed 1,120 additional cases bringing the total to 40,663. Of the new cases: 05 were imported, 04 were contacts of previously confirmed cases or other imported cases, 1,110 patients had their modes of transmission placed under investigation/undetermined and 01 was determined to be of local transmission not epidemiologically linked. The patients included: 634 females and 486 males; all of whom range between 02-days and 97-years and provided addresses in all parishes. During this three day period, the health ministry also reported: the recovery and release of 424 patients bringing the recovery total to 18,208; and 16 COVID-19 related deaths bringing the official death toll to 613. By the end of the same period, the number of coincidental deaths stood at 100 and the cause of death for 83 COVID-19 patients were being investigated. By the end of this week, the recovery rate was 44.63% and the fatality rate was 1.51%.

Between 4 and 10 April, the Ministry of Health and Wellness confirmed 1,837 additional cases bringing the total to 42,500. Of the new cases: 38 were imported, 06 were contacts of previously confirmed cases or other imported cases, 1,790 patients had their modes of transmission placed under investigation/undetermined and 03 were determined to be of local transmission not epidemiologically linked. The patients included: 970 females, 866 males and one patient whose sex classification had not been immediately determined. The patients ranged between 08-days and 101-years and provided addresses in all parishes. During this week long period, the health ministry also reported: the recovery and release of 747 patients bringing the recovery total to 18,896; and 57 COVID-19 related deaths bringing the official death toll to 672. By the end of the same period, the number of coincidental deaths stood at 103 and the cause of death for 108 COVID-19 patients were being investigated. By the end of this week, the recovery rate was 44.46% and the fatality rate was 1.58%.

Between 11 and 17 April, the Ministry of Health and Wellness confirmed 1,390 additional cases bringing the total to 43,890. Of the new cases: 28 were imported, 02 were contacts of previously confirmed cases or other imported cases, 1,359 patients had their modes of transmission placed under investigation/undetermined and 01 was determined to be of local transmission not epidemiologically linked. The patients included: 758 females, 630 males and two patients whose sex classification had not been immediately determined. The patients ranged between 32-days and 104-years and provided addresses in all parishes. During this week long period, the health ministry also reported: the recovery and release of 814 patients bringing the recovery total to 19,710; and 51 COVID-19 related deaths bringing the official death toll to 723. By the end of the same period, the number of coincidental deaths stood at 109 and the cause of death for 119 COVID-19 patients were being investigated. By the end of this week, the recovery rate was 44.91% and the fatality rate was 1.65%.

== Statistics ==
=== Cumulative cases, deaths and recoveries ===
View source data.

=== New cases per day ===
View source data.

=== Deaths per day ===
View source data.

=== Recoveries per day ===
View source data.

=== Cases by parishes ===
Parish	Confirmed	Recovered	Deaths
Hanover	1,352	489	22
St Elizabeth	2,025	1,417	78
St James	4,802	2,416	128
Trelawny	1,700	721849	54
Westmoreland	2,209	1,556	82
Clarendon	2,717	586	38
Manchester	2,988	1,104	86
St Ann	3,333	2,062	65
St Catherine	9,907	6,682	162
St Mary	1,640	1,278	42
Portland	1,589	519	24
Kingston & St Andrew	13,854	9,701	261
St Thomas	1,976	1,370	32
13/13	50,092	30,039	1074
Last update 1 July, 2021

=== Patient demographics ===
Geographical distribution of confirmed cases
(last updated 21 March 2021)
View source data.
Sex classification of patients
(last updated 21 March 2021)
View source data.
Age profile of cases
(last updated 14 August 2020)
View source data.

== See also ==
- COVID-19 pandemic in North America
- COVID-19 pandemic by country
- Caribbean Public Health Agency
- 2020 in the Caribbean
- Influx of disease in the Caribbean
- HIV/AIDS in Latin America
- 2013–2014 chikungunya outbreak
- 2009 swine flu pandemic
- 2019–2020 dengue fever epidemic
