= Monarchy of Jamaica =

King of Jamaica
- Coat of arms of Jamaica

Incumbent
- Charles III since 8 September 2022

Details
- Style: His Majesty
- Heir apparent: William, Prince of Wales
- First monarch: Elizabeth II
- Formed: 6 August 1962

The monarchy of Jamaica (Jamaican Patois: Manaki a Jumieka) is a system of government in which a hereditary monarch is the sovereign and head of state of Jamaica. The current Jamaican monarch and head of state, since 8 September 2022, is King Charles III. As sovereign, he is the personal embodiment of the Jamaican Crown. Although the person of the sovereign is equally shared with 14 other independent countries within the Commonwealth of Nations, each country's monarchy is separate and legally distinct. As a result, the current monarch is officially titled King of Jamaica and, in this capacity, he and other members of the royal family undertake public and private functions domestically and abroad as representatives of the Jamaican state. However, the monarch is the only member of the royal family with any constitutional role.

All executive authority of Jamaica is vested in the monarch, and royal assent is required for the Jamaican Parliament to enact laws and for letters patent and Orders in Council to have legal effect. Most of the powers are exercised by the elected members of parliament, the ministers of the Crown generally drawn from amongst them, and the judges and justices of the peace. Other powers vested in the monarch, such as dismissal of a prime minister, are significant but are treated only as reserve powers and as an important security part of the role of the monarchy.

The Crown today primarily functions as a guarantor of continuous and stable governance and a nonpartisan safeguard against the abuse of power. While some powers are exercisable only by the sovereign, most of the monarch's operational and ceremonial duties are exercised by his representative, the governor-general of Jamaica. Over the years, the Crown of Jamaica has evolved to become a distinctly Jamaican institution, represented by its own unique symbols.

Since the 1970s, there has been debate in Jamaica on replacing the monarchy with a republic. The current prime minister, Andrew Holness, expressed an intention for the government to hold a referendum on the subject by 2025, though this did not occur.

== History ==
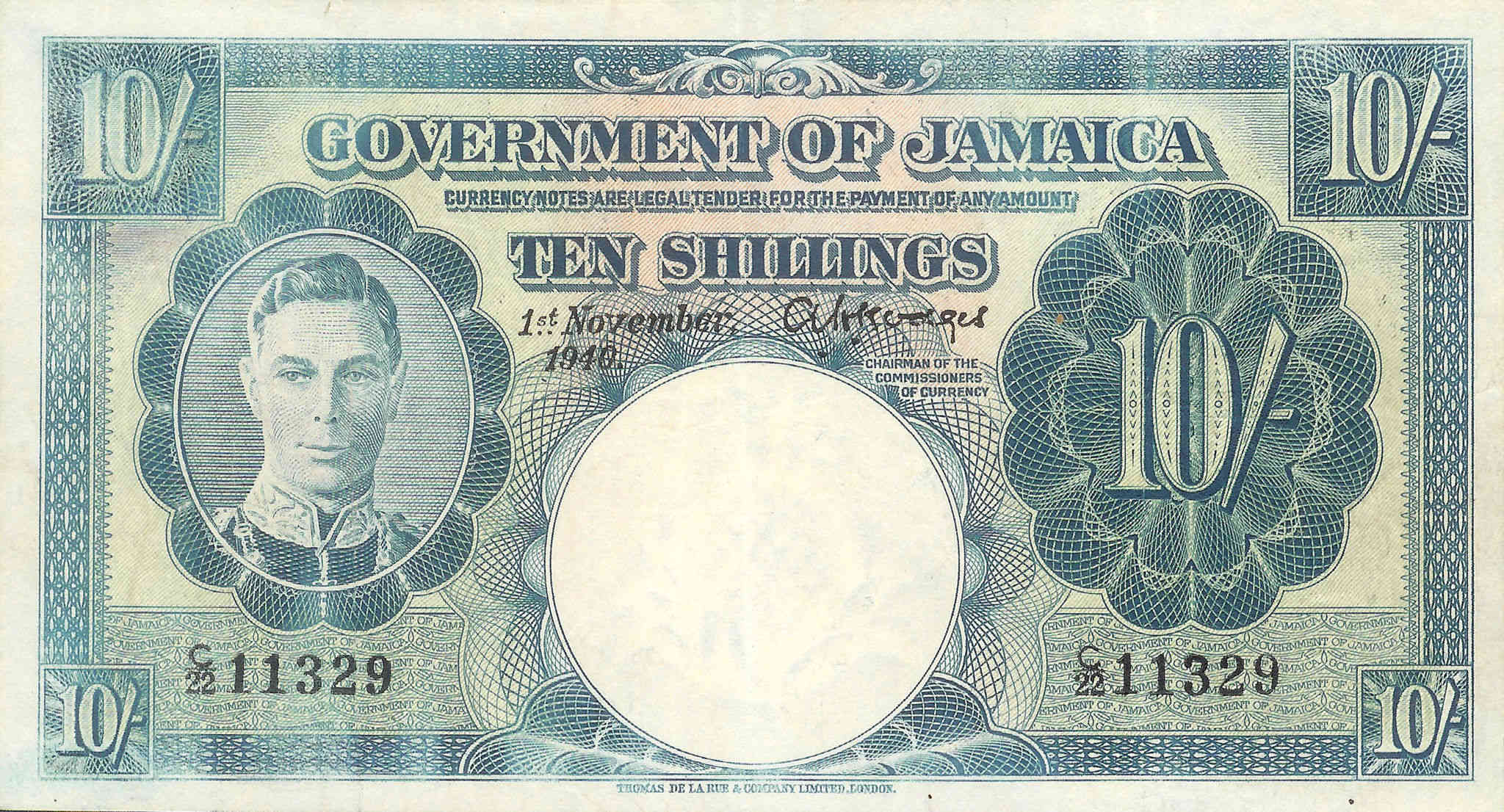
A 1940 Jamaican 10-shilling banknote featuring King George VI

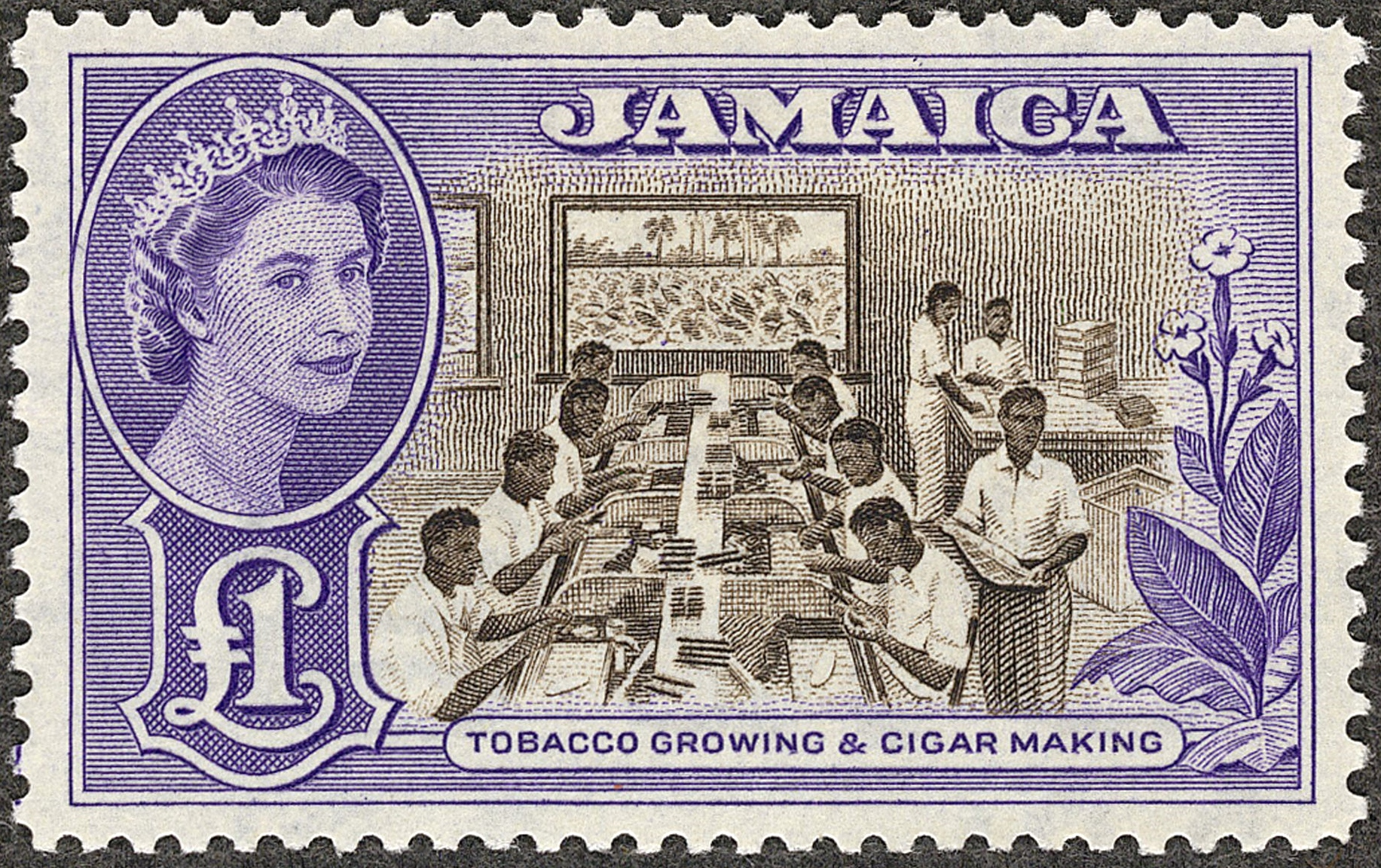
A Jamaican postage stamp of 1956, featuring Queen Elizabeth II

In 1655, a British expedition under Admiral Sir William Penn and General Robert Venables captured Jamaica and they began expelling the Spanish, a task that was accomplished within five years. Spain recognized British sovereignty over Jamaica in the Treaty of Madrid (1670). The Royal African Company was formed in 1672 with a monopoly of the British slave trade, and from that time Jamaica became one of the world's busiest slave markets. Jamaica also became one of Britain's most-valuable colonies in terms of agricultural production.

A limited form of local government was introduced with the creation of the House of Assembly of Jamaica in 1664; however, it represented only a tiny number of rich plantation owners. The British Parliament abolished the transatlantic slave trade in 1807, and Parliament subsequently approved an emancipatory act that gave all enslaved people in British colonies their freedom by 1838. In 1866, the island was declared a crown colony. Its newly appointed governor, Sir John Peter Grant, helped reorganise the colony, including establishing a police force, reformed judicial system, medical service, public works department, and government savings bank.

The constitution of 1944 established a House of Representatives, whose members were elected by universal adult suffrage. After attempting in 1958 a federation with other West Indian colonies, Jamaica continued as a self-governing colony of the United Kingdom, until the passage of the Jamaica Independence Act in 1962. Jamaica thus became a sovereign state and independent constitutional monarchy with Queen Elizabeth II as head of state and Queen of Jamaica.

Front page of The Daily Gleaner announcing Jamaican independence

The Queen's sister, Princess Margaret, represented her at the independence celebrations in August 1962. On 7 August, the Princess opened the first parliament of independent Jamaica, on behalf of the Queen. The Queen also sent a personal message to Jamaicans in which she welcomed the newly-independent country into the Commonwealth, and said: "I am sure that your country, which has already given an example to the world of how people of many varied origins and traditions may live together in harmony, will have a vital contribution to make to the cause of fuller cooperation, understanding and tolerance far beyond the immediate area of the world in which it is situated".

=== Development of shared monarchy ===
In the lead-up to Jamaican independence in 1962, the Parliament of Jamaica established a cross-party joint select committee to prepare a new constitution. The committee received several submissions calling for Jamaica to become a republic, which it "heard politely, but rejected unceremoniously". Both major party leaders in Jamaica in the lead-up to independence (Alexander Bustamante of the Jamaica Labour Party and Norman Manley of the People's National Party) were opposed to Jamaica becoming a republic.

The Jamaica Labour Party, led by Alexander Bustamante, affirmed its loyalty to the monarchy in the party's constitution, which sought to instil "in the hearts of the people reverence for God, loyalty to the Queen and respect for lawful constituted authority".

I make no apology for the fact that we did not embark upon any original or novel exercise in constitutional building... Let us not make the mistake of describing as colonial institutions which are part and parcel of the heritage of this country. If we have any confidence in our own individuality and our own personality, we would absorb these things and incorporate them into own use as part of the heritage we are not ashamed of. I am not ashamed of any institution which exists in this country merely because it derives from England.

— Norman Manley, 1962

Norman Manley admired British constitutionalism and explained the position taken by the Joint Committee of the Jamaican Parliament in 1962. Manley argued that the institutional set-up of the country should reflect the constitutional history of the colony and Britain itself. This was seen as Manley's strong endorsement of the Westminster system as a whole, and that the Queen should be retained in the Constitution as a symbol of continuity. Upon independence, Jamaica opted to retain the monarchy as a leading, and deeply entrenched institution in the constitution.

Law professor Stephen Vasciannie has suggested that the decision to retain the monarchy at independence was due to several factors, including a desire for continuity and stability, a desire to demonstrate the maturity required for independence, the popularity of the royal family amongst Jamaicans, and tendencies towards Anglophilia among the political elites.

== The Jamaican Crown and its aspects ==
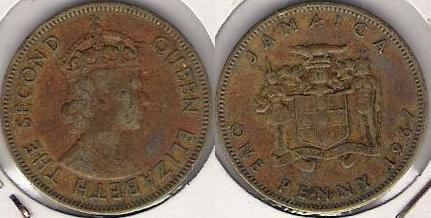
Elizabeth II, Queen of Jamaica, on the obverse of a Jamaican one penny, 1967

Jamaica is one of fifteen independent nations, known as Commonwealth realms, which shares its sovereign with other realms in the Commonwealth of Nations, with the monarch's relationship with Jamaica completely independent from his or her position as monarch of any other realm. Despite sharing the same person as their respective monarch, each of the Commonwealth realms — including Jamaica — is sovereign and independent of the others. (Note: The English Court of Appeal ruled in 1982, while "there is only one person who is the Sovereign within the British Commonwealth... in matters of law and government the Queen of the United Kingdom, for example, is entirely independent and distinct from the Queen of Canada.") The Jamaican monarch is represented by a viceroy—the governor-general of Jamaica—in the country.

Since Jamaican independence in 1962, the pan-national Crown has had both a shared and a separate character and the sovereign's role as monarch of Jamaica is distinct to his or her position as monarch of any other realm, including the United Kingdom. The monarchy thus ceased to be an exclusively British institution and in Jamaica became a Jamaican, or "domesticated" establishment.

Jamaica and her people occupy a special place in our affections, for Prince Philip and I, and other members of our family have always received here a warmth of welcome which has only been rivalled by that of your famous sunshine. I am therefore delighted to be with you, as Queen of Jamaica to join in your celebration of twenty-one years of nationhood.

— Elizabeth II of Jamaica, 1983

This division is illustrated in a number of ways: The sovereign, for example, holds a unique Jamaican title and, when he is acting in public specifically as a representative of Jamaica, he uses, where possible, Jamaican symbols, including the country's national flag, unique royal symbols, and the like. Also, only Jamaican government ministers can advise the sovereign on matters of the Jamaican state.

=== Title ===
Shortly after independence, Elizabeth II, at the request of the Prime Minister of Jamaica, adopted separate and distinct style and titles in her role as Queen of Jamaica. Per a proclamation on 18 August 1962, the Queen's style and titles in relation to Jamaica became: Elizabeth the Second, by the Grace of God of Jamaica and of Her other Realms and Territories Queen, Head of the Commonwealth.

Since the accession of Charles III, the monarch's title is: Charles the Third, by the Grace of God of Jamaica and of His other Realms and Territories King, Head of the Commonwealth.

This style communicates Jamaica's status as an independent monarchy, highlighting the monarch's role specifically as Sovereign of Jamaica, as well as the shared aspect of the Crown throughout the realms, by mentioning Jamaica separately from the other Commonwealth realms. Typically, the Sovereign is styled "King of Jamaica" and is addressed as such when in Jamaica, or performing duties on behalf of Jamaica abroad.

In the creole language Jamaican Patois, Queen Elizabeth II was known as Missis Queen and The Queen Lady.

=== Succession ===
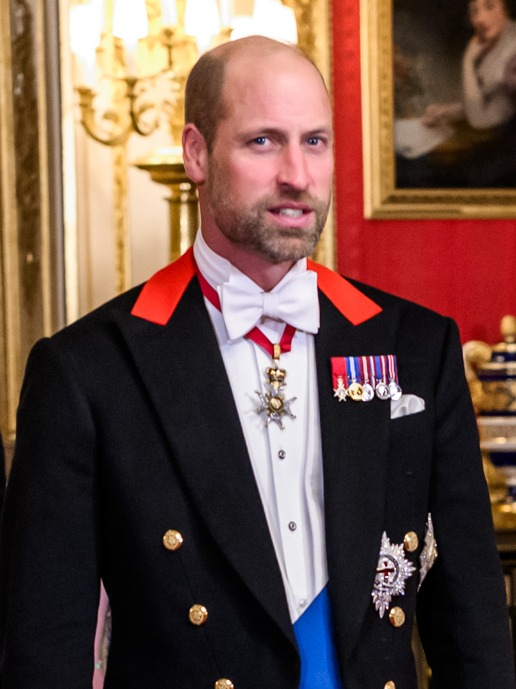
William, Prince of Wales, is the current heir apparent to the throne of Jamaica

Like some realms, Jamaica defers to United Kingdom law to determine the line of succession.

Succession is by absolute primogeniture governed by the provisions of the Succession to the Crown Act 2013, as well as the Act of Settlement, 1701, and the Bill of Rights, 1689. This legislation limits the succession to the natural (i.e. non-adopted), legitimate descendants of Sophia, Electress of Hanover, and stipulates that the monarch cannot be a Roman Catholic, nor married to one, and must be in communion with the Church of England upon ascending the throne. Though these constitutional laws, as they apply to Jamaica, still lie within the control of the British parliament, both the United Kingdom and Jamaica cannot change the rules of succession without the unanimous consent of the other realms, unless explicitly leaving the shared monarchy relationship; a situation that applies identically in all the other realms, and which has been likened to a treaty amongst these countries.

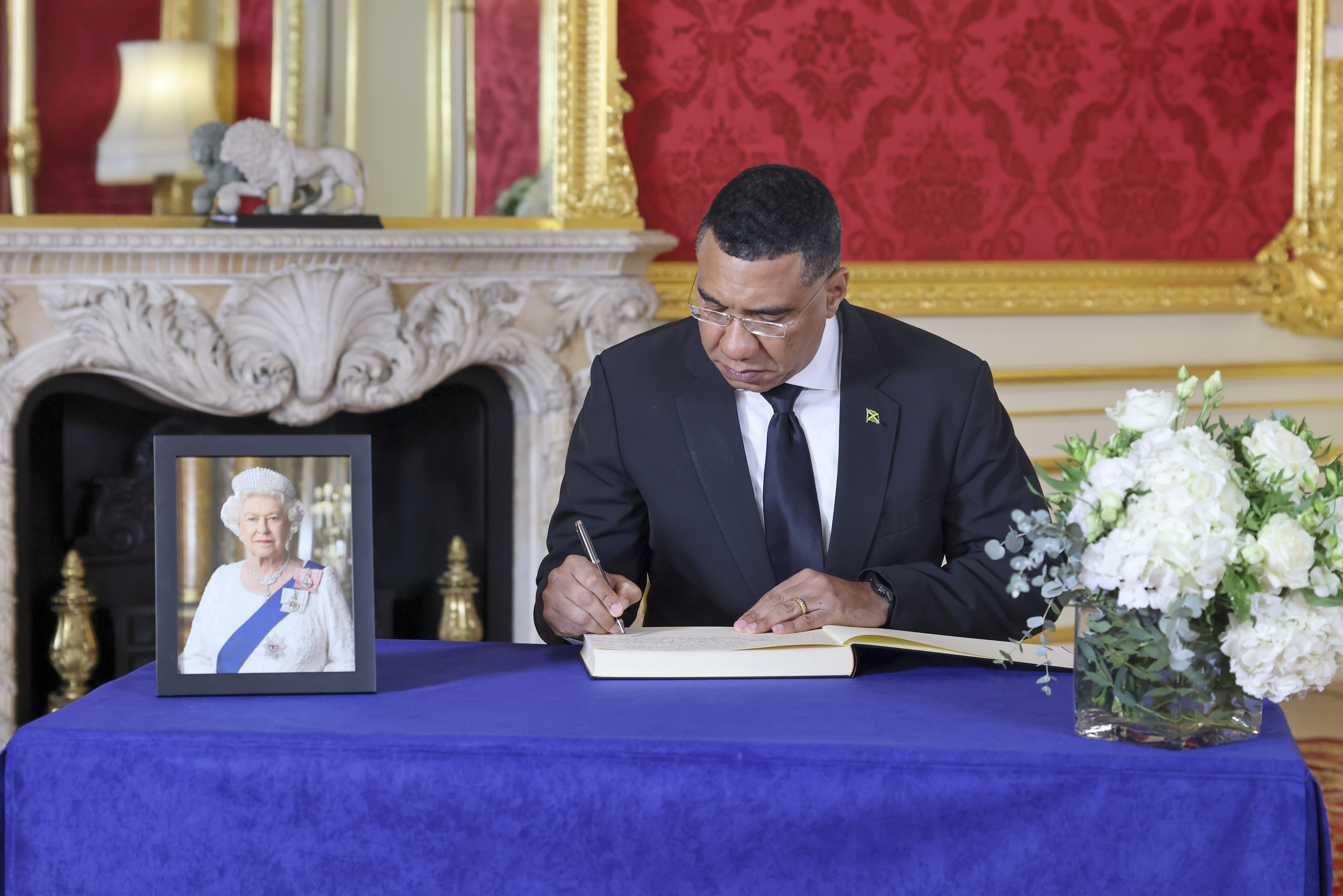
Prime Minister Andrew Holness signing the book of condolences in memory of Queen Elizabeth II at Lancaster House, 17 September 2022

Upon a demise of the Crown (the death or abdication of a sovereign), it is customary for the accession of the new monarch to be publicly proclaimed by the governor-general in the capital, Kingston, after the accession. Regardless of any proclamations, the late sovereign's heir immediately and automatically succeeds, without any need for confirmation or further ceremony. An appropriate period of mourning also follows, during which flags across the country are flown at half-mast to honour the late monarch. Memorial services for the late monarch are held in all parishes of Jamaica.

== Personification of the state ==
I don't regard The Queen as Queen of England, she is Queen of Jamaica, and then by accident, she is Queen of England.

— Governor-General Kenneth O. Hall, 2002

The sovereign is regarded as the personification, or legal personality, of the Jamaican state. Therefore, the state is referred to as His Majesty in Right of Jamaica. As such, the monarch is the owner of all state lands (called Crown land), buildings and equipment (called Crown property), and the copyright for all government publications (called Crown copyright). Government officials are also employed by the Crown, as are the governor-general, the prime minister, judges, members of the Jamaica Defence Force, and police officers. Many officials were once required by law to recite an oath of allegiance to the monarch before taking their posts, however the oaths were amended in 2002, removing mention of the monarch. Nonetheless, under the Jamaican Nationality Act, new Jamaican citizens have to take an oath or affirmation of allegiance to the Jamaican monarch, his heirs and successors. The current oath is:

"I, (name), do swear that I will be faithful and bear true allegiance to His Majesty King Charles the Third, His Heirs and Successors according to the Laws of Jamaica and that I will faithfully observe the laws of Jamaica and fulfil my duties as a citizen of Jamaica. So help me God."

== Constitutional role and royal prerogative ==
My husband and I are happy to be visiting Jamaica again. We have pleasant recollections of our previous visit and look forward to meeting many people here and to enjoying the hospitality and natural beauty of your country of which you are justly proud.

— Elizabeth II of Jamaica, Speech from the Throne at the Jamaican Parliament, 5 March 1966

The Constitution of Jamaica gives the country a similar parliamentary system of government to the other Commonwealth realms, wherein the role of the monarch and governor-general is both legal and practical, but not political. The Crown is regarded as a corporation, in which several parts shared the authority of the whole, with the sovereign as the person at the centre of the constitutional construct, meaning all powers of the state are constitutionally reposed in the monarch. As head of state, the sovereign is at the apex of the Jamaican Order of Precedence.

The constitution requires most of the sovereign's domestic duties to be performed by the governor-general, appointed by the monarch on the advice of the prime minister of Jamaica.

All institutions of government act under the sovereign's authority; the vast powers that belong to the Jamaican Crown are collectively known as the Royal Prerogative. Parliamentary approval is not required for the exercise of the Royal Prerogative; moreover, the consent of the Crown is must before either of the houses of parliament may even debate a bill affecting the sovereign's prerogatives or interests.

=== Executive ===
One of the main duties of the Crown is to appoint a prime minister, who thereafter heads the Cabinet of Jamaica and advises the monarch or governor-general on how to execute their executive powers over all aspects of government operations and foreign affairs. The monarch's, and thereby the viceroy's role is almost entirely symbolic and cultural, acting as a symbol of the legal authority under which all governments and agencies operate, while the Cabinet directs the use of the Royal Prerogative, which includes the privilege to declare war, maintain the King's peace, and direct the actions of the Jamaica Defence Force, as well as to summon and prorogue parliament and call elections. However, the Royal Prerogative belongs to the Crown and not to any of the ministers, though it might have sometimes appeared that way, and the constitution allows the governor-general to unilaterally use these powers in relation to the dismissal of a prime minister, dissolution of parliament, and removal of a judge in exceptional, constitutional crisis situations.

The flag of the Jamaican Governor-General featuring St Edward's Crown

There are also a few duties which are specifically performed by the monarch, such as appointing the governor-general.

The governor-general, to maintain the stability of government, appoints as prime minister the individual most likely to maintain the support of the House of Representatives. The sovereign is informed by his viceroy of the acceptance of the resignation of a prime minister and the swearing-in of a new prime minister and other members of the ministry, he remains fully briefed through regular communications from his Jamaican ministers, and he holds regular audiences with them whenever possible. The governor-general is also responsible of the appointment of the leader of the Opposition, members of the Cabinet, privy councillors, senators, the Chief Justice, President of the Court of Appeal, ministers of State, judges of the Court of Appeal, chairs of the Public Services Commissions, and the Director of Public Prosecutions.

=== Foreign affairs ===
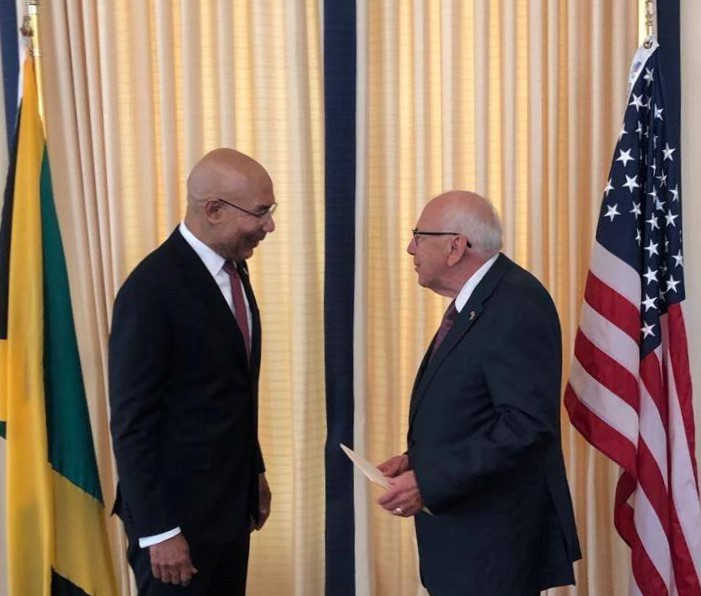
U.S. Ambassador to Jamaica Donald R. Tapia presenting his credentials to Governor-General Sir Patrick Allen, 2019

The Royal Prerogative further extends to foreign affairs: the governor-general ratifies treaties, alliances, and international agreements. As with other uses of the Royal Prerogative, no parliamentary approval is required. However, a treaty cannot alter the domestic laws of Jamaica; an Act of Parliament is necessary in such cases. The governor-general, on behalf of the monarch, also accredits Jamaican High Commissioners and ambassadors and receives diplomats from foreign states. In addition, the issuance of passports falls under the Royal Prerogative and, as such, all Jamaican passports are issued in the governor-general's name, the monarch's representative in Jamaica.

=== Parliament ===
The sovereign, along with the Senate and the House of Representatives, is one of the three components of the Parliament of Jamaica. The authority of the Crown is embodied in the mace of the Parliament, which bears a crown at its apex.

The monarch does not, however, participate in the legislative process; the viceroy does, though only in the granting of Royal Assent. Further, the constitution outlines that the governor-general alone is responsible for appointing senators. The viceroy makes thirteen senatorial appointments on the advice of the prime minister, and eight on the advice of the leader of the opposition. The viceroy additionally summons, prorogues, and dissolves parliament; after the latter, the writs for a general election are issued by the governor-general at King's House.

Although for some it is viewed as a mere ritual, the Throne Speech plays an important role in outlining the priorities of the Government for the new financial year, bringing together all arms of the state in partnership towards building the new and prosperous Jamaica.

— Governor-General Sir Patrick Allen, 2019

The new parliamentary session is marked by the Ceremonial Opening of Parliament, during which the monarch or the governor-general reads the Speech from the Throne.

External videos
- Behind the Ceremonial Opening of Parliament; Source: Jamaica Information Service.

All laws in Jamaica are enacted only with the viceroy's granting of Royal Assent in the monarch's name. The Royal Assent, and proclamation, are required for all acts of parliament, usually granted or withheld by the governor-general, with the Broad Seal of Jamaica.

Until 2024, Jamaican bills began with the phrase: "Be it enacted by The King's [or Queen's] Most Excellent Majesty, by and with the advice and consent of the Senate and House of Representatives of Jamaica, and by the authority of the same, as follows". The reference to the sovereign was dropped from the words of enactment by the Constitution (Amendment of Section 61) Act, 2024.

=== Courts ===
The sovereign is responsible for rendering justice for all his subjects, and is thus traditionally deemed the fount of justice. In Jamaica, criminal offences are legally deemed to be offences against the sovereign and proceedings for indictable offences are brought in the sovereign's name in the form of The King [or Queen] versus [Name]. Hence, the common law holds that the sovereign "can do no wrong"; the monarch cannot be prosecuted in his own courts for criminal offences.

All judges of the Supreme Court of Jamaica are appointed by the governor-general. The highest court of appeal for Jamaica is the Judicial Committee of the King's Privy Council.

The governor-general, on behalf of the Jamaican monarch, can also grant immunity from prosecution, exercise the royal prerogative of mercy, and pardon offences against the Crown, either before, during, or after a trial. The exercise of the 'Prerogative of mercy' to grant a pardon and the commutation of prison sentences is described in section 90 of the Constitution.

== Cultural role ==
=== The Crown and Honours ===
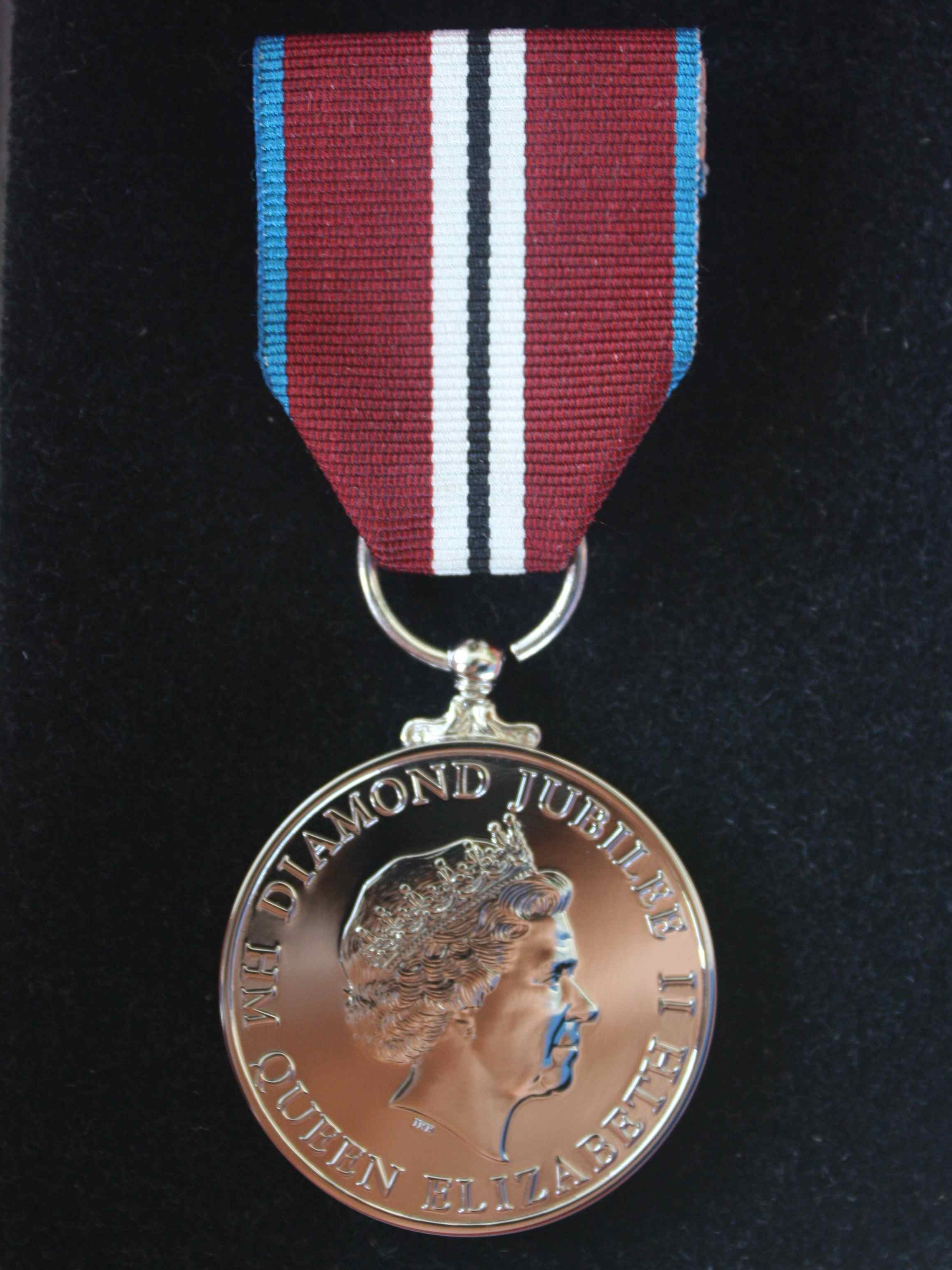
The Queen Elizabeth II Diamond Jubilee Medal was awarded in 2012 to about 6,000 Jamaicans to commemorate the Queen's Diamond Jubilee.

Within the Commonwealth realms, the monarch is deemed the fount of honour. The monarch or the governor-general confers awards and honours in Jamaica on the advice of Jamaican ministers.

By the passage of The National Honours and Awards Act in 1969, Jamaica established six national orders on 18 July 1969. The governor-general serves as the Chancellor of the Order of National Hero, and is responsible for the administration of that order. Every year on the third Monday of October, Jamaica commemorates National Heroes Day. On that day, the governor-general holds investiture ceremonies and presents national honours and awards to deserving Jamaicans at King's House.

In Jamaica, the Sovereign's jubilee is celebrated by awarding commemorative medals to members of the Jamaican frontline services. Special Jubilee medals were awarded in 2012 for the Queen's Diamond Jubilee, and in 2022 for the Queen's Platinum Jubilee.

=== The Crown and the Defence Force ===
The seal of the Jamaica Defence Force featuring the Crown of St Edward

The Crown sits at the pinnacle of the Jamaica Defence Force. It is reflected in Jamaican naval vessels, which bear the prefix HMJS, i.e., His Majesty's Jamaica Ship.

St Edward's Crown appears on the Jamaica Defence Force badges, which illustrates the monarchy as the locus of authority.

The power to grant commissions in the Jamaica Defence Force is vested in the monarch, and is exercised on the monarch's behalf by the governor-general.

The Crown's relationship with the Jamaica Defence Force has been reflected through a number of ways over the years, including the awarding of the Queen's Medal for Champion Shots in the Military Forces and Jubilee medals to members of the Force, the presentation of the Sovereign's Colour and the Regimental Colour to the Jamaica Regiment by the governor-general on behalf of the monarch, the involvement of members of the JDF at royal events in the United Kingdom, and through the participation of members of the royal family in military ceremonies in Jamaica.

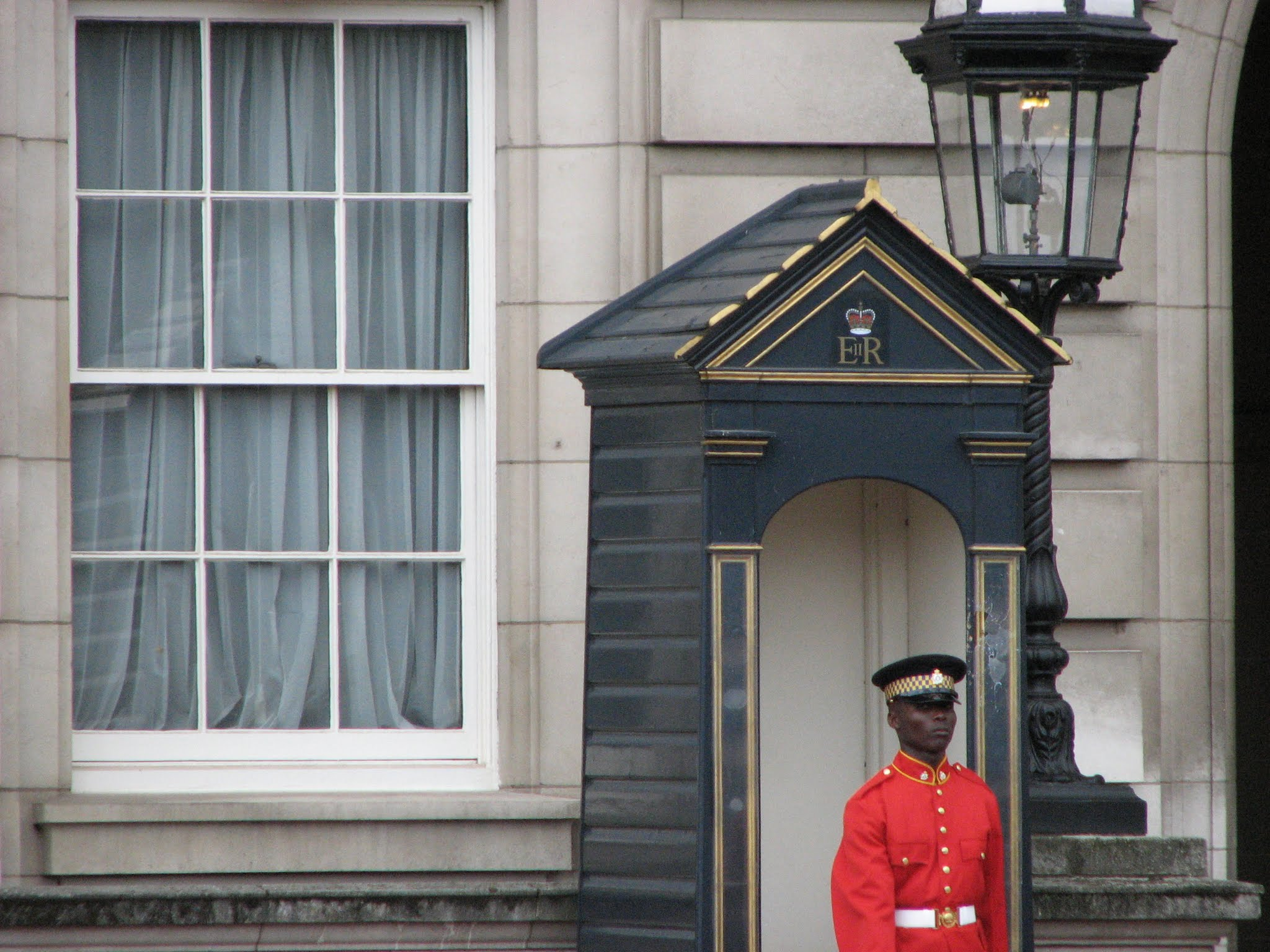
A sentry of the Jamaica Defence Force at Buckingham Palace forming the Queen's Guard, 2007

In 1999, Jamaica became the first Caribbean realm to mount the Queen's Guard, when troops from C company, 2nd Battalion, Jamaica Regiment did so at Buckingham Palace. In 2007, soldiers of the 1st Battalion, the Jamaican Regiment mounted the Queen's Guard at Buckingham Palace and the Windsor Castle Guard. Then-Lieutenant Colonel Derek Robinson, commanding the Jamaica Regiment, remarked that mounting the Queen's Guard "symbolizes one of the highest tributes" Jamaicans can pay to the sovereign.

=== The Crown and the Constabulary Force ===
Every member of the Jamaica Constabulary Force has to swear allegiance to the Jamaican monarch, on taking office. Under the Constabulary Force Act, every police officer must take the following oath upon joining the force:

"I, (name), do swear that I will well and truly serve Our Sovereign Lord the King, in the office of _____, without favour or affection, malice or ill-will and that I will see and cause His Majesty's Peace to be kept and preserved; and that I will prevent, to the utmost of my power, all offences against the same; and that while I shall continue to hold the said office I will, to the best of my skill and knowledge, discharge all the duties thereof faithfully, according to law. So help me God."

St Edward's Crown is used on the badge of the Jamaica Constabulary Force, and is incorporated into the rank insignias for commissioner, senior superintendent, and superintendent.

=== Jamaican royal symbols ===
The standard of Elizabeth II, Queen of Jamaica, created in 1966

From the beginning of Queen Elizabeth II's reign onwards, royal symbols in Jamaica have been altered to make them distinctly Jamaican or new ones created, such as the Queen's Royal Standard for Jamaica, created in 1966. Second in precedence is the personal flag of the governor-general.

Queen Elizabeth II's personal flag in her role as Queen of Jamaica was first used when she visited Jamaica in 1966, as part of her Caribbean tour. The flag consists of a banner of the coat of arms of Jamaica defaced with the Queen's royal cypher. The flag is white and bears a red St George's Cross. A gold pineapple is superimposed on each arm of the Cross. A blue disc with the Royal Cypher is placed in the centre of the Cross. The disc is taken from the Queen's Personal Flag.

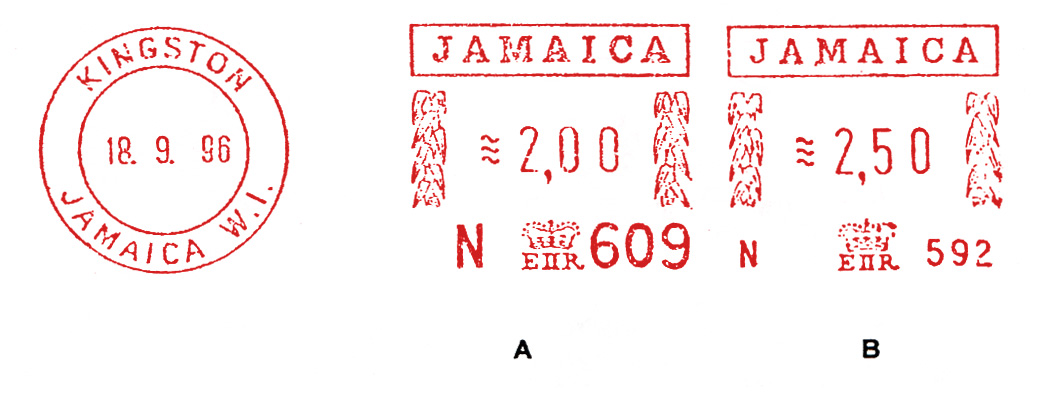
Jamaican meter stamps displaying the Queen Elizabeth II's royal cypher, 1996

A crown is used to illustrate the monarchy as the locus of authority, appearing on various badges and rank insignia.

In the role of the state personified, the monarch owns jewellery pieces that are distinctively Jamaican, such as the Jamaican Hummingbird brooch. The brooch was gifted to the Queen of Jamaica, Elizabeth II, during her Golden Jubilee visit in 2002. The Duchess of Cambridge also wore the brooch during her visit to Jamaica in 2022.

=== Royal visits ===
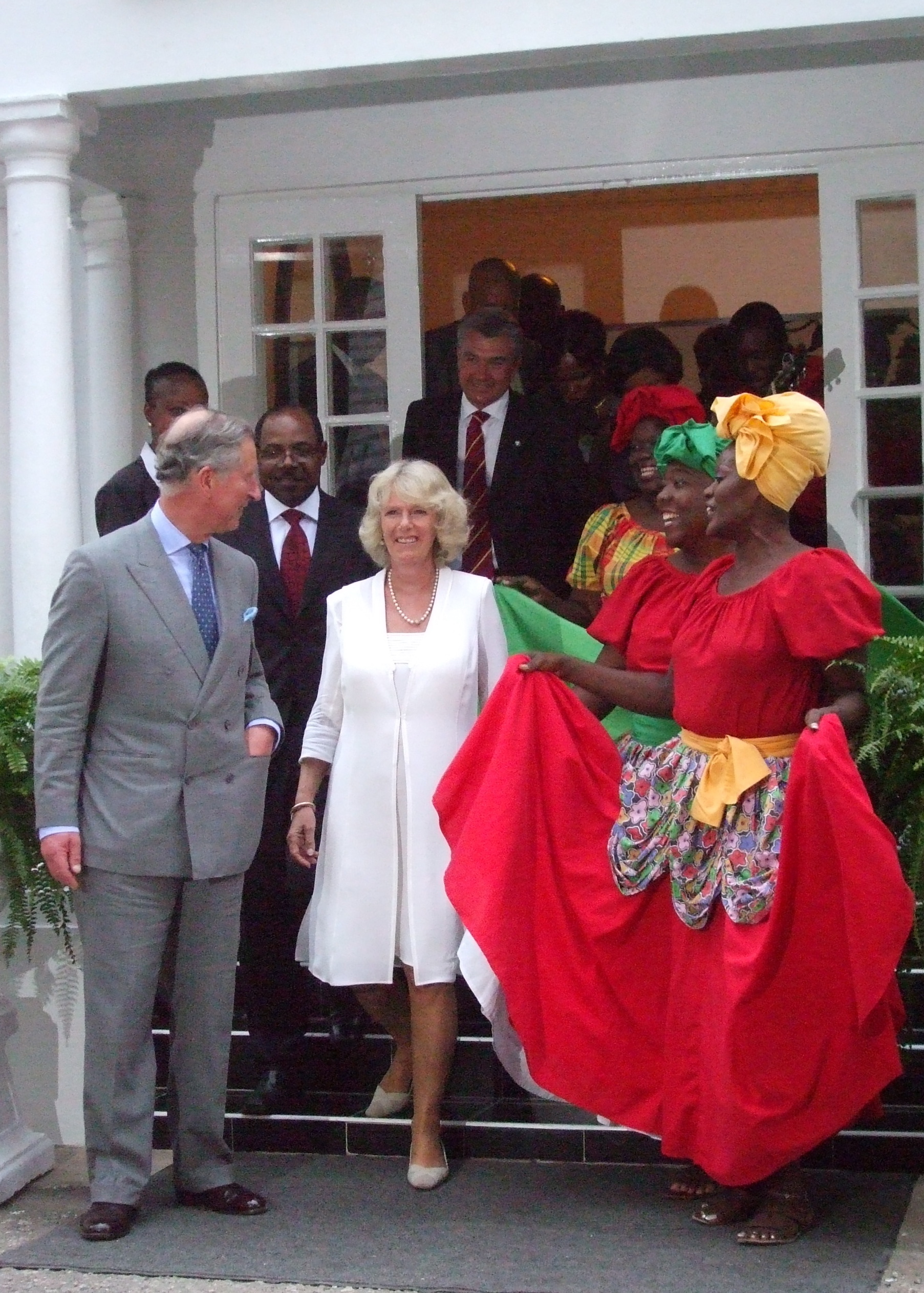
The Prince of Wales and the Duchess of Cornwall in Jamaica, March 2008

Queen Elizabeth II's first tour of Jamaica was in November 1953.

At Jamaica's independence celebrations in 1962, the Queen was represented by her sister Princess Margaret, who opened the first session of the Parliament of Jamaica on behalf of the Queen.

The Queen toured Jamaica again in March 1966. The same year, Prince Philip, Duke of Edinburgh, accompanied by his son, Prince Charles, Prince of Wales, opened the Commonwealth Games in Kingston. Other tours by the Queen took place in April 1975, February 1983, March 1994, and February 2002; ahead of the latter, the BBC reported that, "despite republican sentiments in the country, she was given an enthusiastic welcome." A poll taken that year showed 57% of those who responded thought the Queen's tour, as part of her Golden Jubilee, was important. The Jamaican polling organisation, Stone, said at the time, "over the years, local social scientists have been confounded by the fascination that Jamaicans have for Queen Elizabeth II".

King Charles III's most recent tour, as Prince of Wales, was in 2008, during which he visited Rose Town, where the Prince's Foundation for the Built Environment regenerated the area and helped with revitalization efforts, after decades of violence, resulting in the demolition and abandonment of houses, roads, and community pillars. The Prince's Foundation began working with residents in 2004, after Charles's visit in 2001, and, in 2008, the foundation pledged to raise about US$4 million to help fund different developmental projects in the Rose Town community. In 2010, the Rose Town Foundation was established to work closely with the Prince's Foundation on all of the planned developments.

== Republicanism ==
Since the 1970s, individuals in both major political parties in Jamaica have voiced support for making Jamaica a republic. The government headed by Michael Manley established a commission into constitutional reform in 1975 and, in July 1977, announced that Jamaica would become a republic by 1981. However, Manley's party was defeated at the 1980 general election by the more conservative Jamaica Labour Party (JLP), led by Edward Seaga. Seaga had expressed a preference for a "ceremonial presidency" in 1977. Despite this, no concrete moves towards a republic occurred during his premiership.

In September 2003, then-Prime Minister of Jamaica P. J. Patterson called for Jamaica to abolish the monarchy by 2007. Bruce Golding, while the prime minister and leader of the conservative Jamaica Labour Party, also pledged that Jamaica shall, "take steps to amend the constitution to replace the Queen with a Jamaican president who symbolises the unity of the nation", without elaborating on how a president would do so.

It's not about getting rid of the Queen—who could get rid of the Queen? She is a wonderful, beautiful lady. The decision to become a republic shouldn't be taken in the context of us wanting to get rid of the Queen.

— Prime Minister Portia Simpson-Miller, 2012

Prime Minister Portia Simpson-Miller expressed her intention to convince parliament to make Jamaica a republic to coincide with the country's 50th anniversary of independence in August 2012, but, did not follow through on obtaining the required support of two-thirds of both houses; Simpson-Miller's People's National Party had a two-thirds majority in the House of Representatives, but, was one seat short in the Senate and would have needed the support of at least one senator from the opposition Jamaica Labour Party. The current leader of the JLP, Andrew Holness, who succeeded Simpson-Miller as prime minister in 2016, announced that the government would introduce a constitutional amendment to "replace Her Majesty the Queen with a non-executive president as head of state".

During the 2020 Jamaican general election, the opposition People's National Party promised to hold a referendum on becoming a republic within 18 months, if it won the election. A poll showed that 55% of respondents supported the idea of the country becoming a republic. However, the ruling Jamaica Labour Party won the election. Two years later, in June, the government announced that Jamaica would become a republic by the time of the next election in 2025. however that failed to materialise and in March 2025 it was confirmed a referendum on the matter would not be held until an unspecified date after the 2025 general election.

== List of Jamaican monarchs ==
Portrait	Regnal name (Birth–Death)	Reign over Jamaica		Full name	Consort	House
Portrait	Regnal name (Birth–Death)	Start	End	Full name	Consort	House
	Elizabeth II (1926–2022)	6 August 1962	8 September 2022	Elizabeth Alexandra Mary	Philip Mountbatten	Windsor
	Elizabeth II (1926–2022)	Governors-general: Sir Kenneth Blackburne, Sir Clifford Campbell, Sir Herbert Duffus (acting), Sir Florizel Glasspole, Edward Zacca (acting), Sir Howard Cooke, Sir Kenneth O. Hall, Sir Patrick Allen; Prime ministers: Sir Alexander Bustamante, Sir Donald Sangster, Hugh Shearer, Michael Manley, Edward Seaga, P. J. Patterson, Portia Simpson-Miller, Bruce Golding, Andrew Holness				
	Charles III (born 1948)	8 September 2022	present	Charles Philip Arthur George	Camilla Shand	Windsor
	Charles III (born 1948)	Governors-general: Sir Patrick Allen; Prime ministers: Andrew Holness				

== See also ==
- Constitution of Jamaica
- Privy Council of Jamaica
- Lists of office-holders
- List of prime ministers of Elizabeth II
- List of prime ministers of Charles III
- List of Commonwealth visits made by Elizabeth II
- Monarchies in the Americas
- List of monarchies
