= Governor-General of Jamaica =

Representative of the monarch

- Gobna-Jinaral a Jumieka
- Coat of arms of Jamaica

- Flag of the governor-general

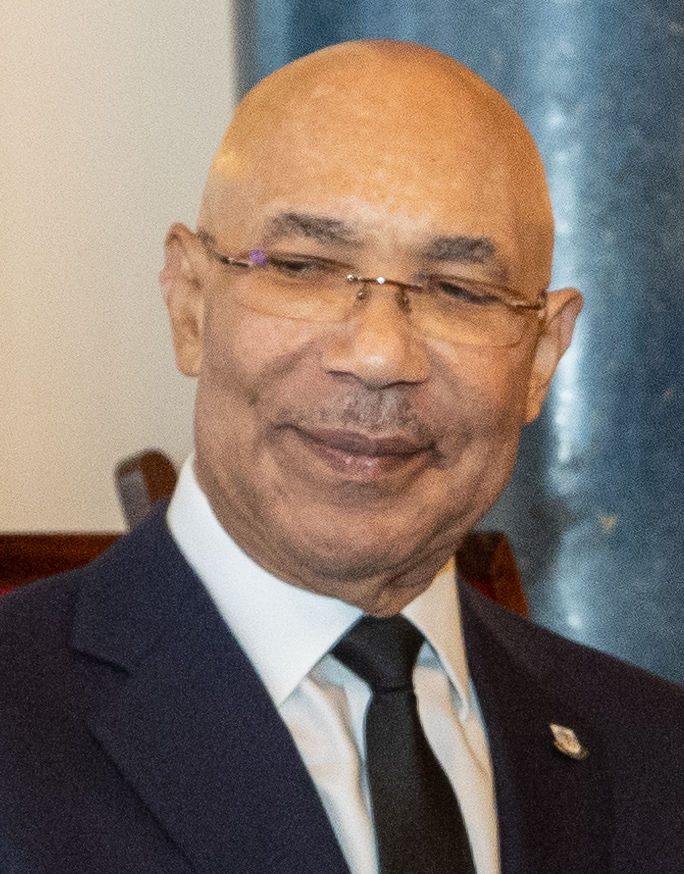
- Incumbent; Patrick Allen since 26 February 2009
- Viceroy
- Style: His Excellency; The Most Honourable
- Reports to: King Charles III
- Residence: King's House, Kingston
- Appointer: Monarch of Jamaica; on the advice of the prime minister
- Term length: At His Majesty's pleasure
- Constituting instrument: Constitution of Jamaica
- Formation: 6 August 1962
- First holder: Kenneth Blackburne
- Salary: JMD $10,850,512.65 annually
- Website: www.kingshouse.gov.jm

The governor-general of Jamaica (Jamaican Patois: Gobna-Jinaral a Jumieka) is the representative of the Jamaican monarch, currently King Charles III, in Jamaica. The governor-general is appointed by the monarch on the recommendation of the prime minister of Jamaica. The functions of the governor-general include appointing ministers, judges, and ambassadors; giving royal assent to legislation passed by parliament; issuing writs for election.

In general, the governor-general observes the conventions of the Westminster system and responsible government, maintaining political neutrality, and acting solely on the advice of the prime minister. The role also includes ceremonial duties, such as hosting events at the official residence—King's House in the capital, Kingston—and presenting honors to individuals and groups who contribute to Jamaica and their communities. When travelling internationally, the governor-general serves as the official representative of Jamaica and its monarch.

Governors-general formally serve "at the monarch's pleasure". Since 26 February 2009, the governor-general has been Patrick Allen.

The office of the governor-general was created on 6 August 1962, when Jamaica gained independence from the United Kingdom as a sovereign state and an independent constitutional monarchy. Since then, six individuals have served as governor-general.

== Appointment ==
The governor-general is formally appointed by the monarch of Jamaica. based on the recommendation of the prime minister, which is accepted by convention. During the installation ceremony, the incoming governor-general takes an oath of allegiance and an oath for the proper execution of the duties of the office. Upon the installation, the new governor-general is invested with the insignia of the Order of the Nation by the Chief Justice of Jamaica.

== Functions ==
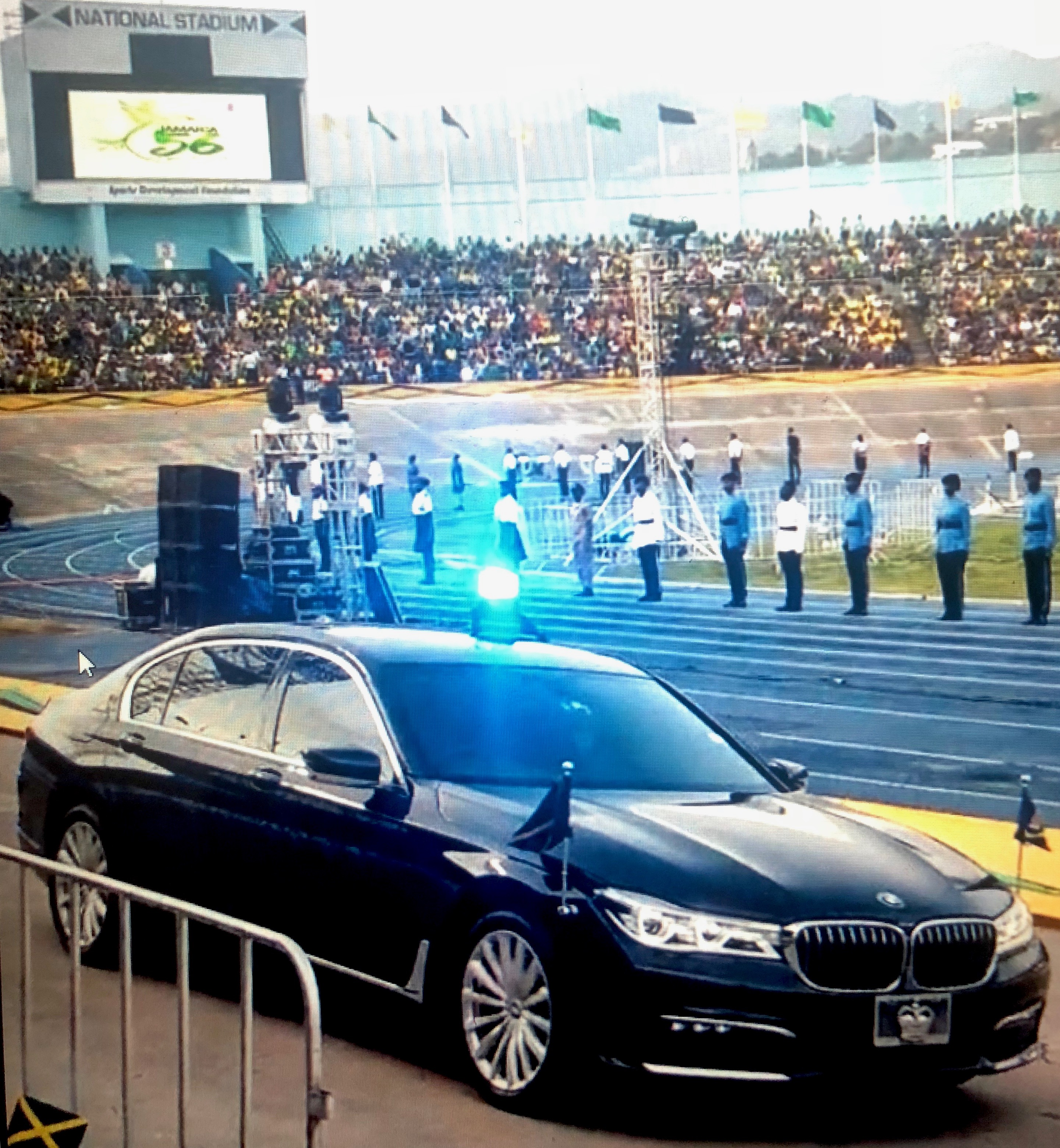
The official state car for the governor-general of Jamaica is a BMW 740Li, featuring a license plate bearing the Crown

Jamaica shares the person of the sovereign equally with 14 other countries in the Commonwealth of Nations. As the sovereign works and resides predominantly outside of Jamaican borders, the governor-general's primary task is to perform the monarch's constitutional duties on their behalf. As such, the governor-general carries out their functions in the government of Jamaica on behalf and in the name of the Sovereign.

The governor-general's powers and duties are derived from Section 27 to 33 of the constitution, which set out certain provisions relating to the governor-general.

=== Constitutional role ===
The constitution gives the governor-general the authority to name the date of a general election, to appoint Ministers and assign them responsibilities to appoint Parliamentary Secretaries, the Attorney General, senators, privy councilors, the Chief Justice, the President of the Court of Appeal, the Director of Public Prosecutions and members of the Services Commissions. In most cases the governor-general acts in accordance with the advice of the prime minister, in some cases also after consultation with the leader of the opposition and in other cases in the recommendation of such authorities as the Services Commissions and the Privy Council.

The constitutional responsibilities of the governor-general also include exercising executive authority, granting the prerogative of mercy, giving royal assent to bills, and appointing members of Service Commissions issuing Proclamations for the proroguing and summoning of Parliament, and declaring States of Emergency.

After an election, it is the governor-general who formally requests the leader of the political party which gains the support of a majority in parliament to form a government. The governor-general commissions the prime minister and appoints other ministers after the election.

The governor-general holds regular meetings with the prime minister, and where necessary with members of the Cabinet and the leader of the opposition.

The governor-general may, in certain circumstances, exercise without—or contrary to—ministerial advice. These are known as the reserve powers.

=== Ceremonial role ===
Governor-General Sir Patrick Allen meeting President Ram Nath Kovind of India at King's House, May 2022

The governor-general's ceremonial duties include opening new sessions of parliament by delivering the Speech from the Throne, welcoming visiting heads of state, and receiving the credentials of foreign diplomats.

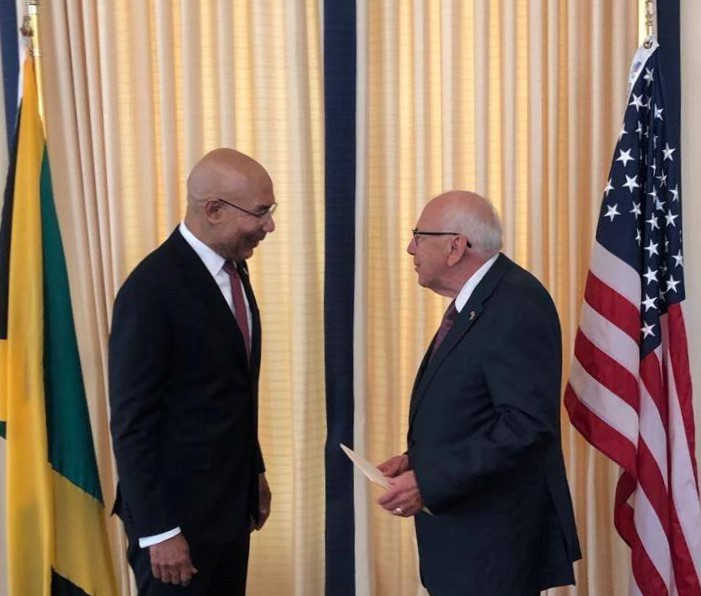
U.S. Ambassador to Jamaica Donald R. Tapia presenting his credentials to Governor-General Sir Patrick Allen, 2019

The governor-general also confers honours and awards to Jamaicans for notable service to the community, or for acts of bravery in a specially convened ceremony at King's House on National Heroes Day.

The governor-general also attends Independence Day celebrations and the Annual Armed Forces Day Parade, and participates in wreath-laying ceremonies on National Heroes Day and Remembrance Day.

=== Community role ===
The governor-general provides non-partisan leadership in the community, and attends various cultural, educational and charitable events of national and local importance.

The governor-general serves as patron of the St. John Ambulance in Jamaica. He is also patron of several other organizations such as the Jamaica Agricultural Society, the Jamaica Cancer Society and the National Road Safety Council. He is also an honorary member of the principal service clubs and is the Chief Scout of Jamaica. The governor-general is also the visitor for the University of Technology.

The governor-general also conducts annual parish tours, to interact with the people, and understand the issues of interest to the Jamaican people.

== Privy Council ==
The Privy Council of Jamaica consists of six members who are appointed by the governor-general, after consultation with the prime minister. The governor-general chairs meetings of the Privy Council which advises him on the exercise of the Royal Prerogative of Mercy and the discipline of the civil service, local government officers, and the police, in cases where appeals are made.

== Role in the parishes ==
The Governor-General is represented in each parish by a Custos Rotulorum. The Custos is appointed by the governor-general on the advice of the prime minister and is a resident of the parish to which he/she is appointed, except in the case of the Corporate Area.

The roles of the Custodes include receiving officials and dignitaries on an official visit in the absence of the governor-general, and receiving the governor-general when he pays official visits to the parish. The Custos also acts as the Chief Magistrate of the parish, and meets the Judge of the Circuit Court at the Court House at the opening session.

== Privileges ==
=== Salary ===
The governor-general receives an annual salary of JMD $10,850,512.65.

=== Symbols ===
Flag of the governor-general of Jamaica

The governor-general uses a personal flag, which features a lion passant atop a St. Edward's royal crown with "Jamaica" written on a scroll underneath, all on a blue background. It is flown on buildings and other locations in Jamaica to mark the governor-general's presence.

=== Residence ===
King's House in Kingston is the official residence of the governor-general of Jamaica. Built in the early 20th century, it has served as the official residence and workplace of all Jamaican governors-general since independence in 1962.

== List of governors-general of Jamaica ==
Following is a list of people who have served as Governor-General of Jamaica since independence in 1962.

Denotes acting governors-general

No.	Portrait	Name (Birth–Death)	Term of office			Monarch (Reign)
No.	Portrait	Name (Birth–Death)	Took office	Left office	Time in office	Monarch (Reign)
1		Sir Kenneth Blackburne (1907–1980)	6 August 1962	30 November 1962	116 days	Elizabeth II (1962–2022)
2		Sir Clifford Campbell (1892–1991)	1 December 1962	28 February 1973	10 years, 89 days	Elizabeth II (1962–2022)
–		Sir Herbert Duffus (1908–2002); Acting Governor-General	28 February 1973	27 June 1973	119 days	Elizabeth II (1962–2022)
3		Sir Florizel Glasspole (1909–2000)	27 June 1973	31 March 1991	17 years, 277 days	Elizabeth II (1962–2022)
–		Edward Zacca (1931–2019); Acting Governor-General	31 March 1991	1 August 1991	123 days	Elizabeth II (1962–2022)
4		Sir Howard Cooke (1915–2014)	1 August 1991	15 February 2006	14 years, 198 days	Elizabeth II (1962–2022)
5		Sir Kenneth O. Hall (b. 1941)	15 February 2006	26 February 2009	3 years, 11 days	Elizabeth II (1962–2022)
6		Sir Patrick Allen (b. 1951)	26 February 2009	Incumbent	17 years, 258 days	
6		Sir Patrick Allen (b. 1951)	26 February 2009	Incumbent	17 years, 258 days	Charles III (2022–present)

== See also ==
- List of governors of Jamaica
- Monarchy of Jamaica
- Politics of Jamaica
- Prime Minister of Jamaica
