= Bryan Sykes (judge) =

Chief Justice of Jamaica since 2018

The Honourable Mr. Justice Bryan Sykes OJ CD

8th Chief Justice of Jamaica
- Incumbent
- Assumed office 1 March 2018
- Preceded by: Zaila McCalla
- In office 1 February 2018 (Note: Acting Chief Justice of Jamaica to 1 March 2018) – 1 March 2018

Personal details
- Born: Bryan Patrick St. George Sykes c. July 22, 1961 (age 65) Portland Parish, Colony of Jamaica, British Empire
- Spouse: Annette Crawford-Sykes
- Education: Titchfield High School; Norman Manley Law School; University of the West Indies; University of Wales
- Occupation: Judge, lawyer
- Awards: Order of Jamaica (2018)

Bryan Patrick St. George Sykes OJ (born July 22, 1960 or 1961) is a Jamaican judge. He was appointed to the Judiciary of Jamaica as the Chief Justice of Jamaica on 1 February 2018 and was sworn in on 1 March 2018.
