= Patrick Allen (governor-general) =

Governor-General of Jamaica since 2009

His Excellency The Most Honourable Sir Patrick Allen ON GCMG CD KStJ
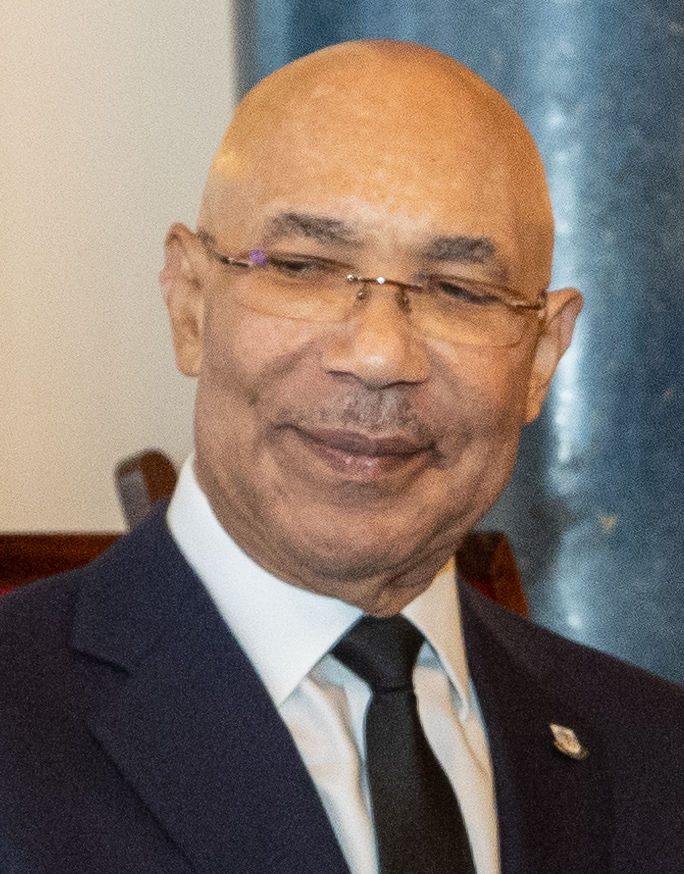
- Allen in 2023

6th Governor-General of Jamaica
- Incumbent
- Assumed office 26 February 2009
- Monarchs: Elizabeth II; Charles III
- Prime Minister: Bruce Golding; Andrew Holness; Portia Simpson-Miller
- Preceded by: Kenneth O. Hall

Personal details
- Born: Patrick Linton Allen; 7 February 1951 (age 75) Fruitful Vale, Colony of Jamaica, British Empire
- Spouse: Patricia Beckford
- Children: 3
- Education: Andrews University (BA, MA)

President of the West Indies Union of Seventh-day Adventists
- In office 2005–2010

President of the Central Jamaica Conference
- In office 1998–2000

Religious life
- Religion: Christianity
- Denomination: Adventism (Seventh-Day Adventist)
- Church: Seventh-Day Adventist Church
- Ordination: 15 September 1962

Sir Patrick Linton Allen ON GCMG CD KStJ (born 7 February 1951) is a Jamaican statesman and former Seventh-day Adventist pastor, who is serving as the sixth and current governor-general of Jamaica since 26 February 2009.

The fourth of five children in a family of subsistence farmers, Allen spent over a decade as a teacher and principal, before leaving education to be trained as an Adventist minister at Andrews University in the United States. After becoming a pastor, Allen went on to serve in a number of leadership roles within the Seventh-day Adventist Church, eventually becoming the leader of the West Indies Union of Seventh-day Adventists, which had jurisdiction over Jamaica, The Bahamas, the Cayman Islands, and the Turks and Caicos Islands.

Allen became Jamaica's sixth appointed governor-general (eighth overall, including two acting governors-general). He replaced Kenneth O. Hall, who resigned for health reasons. Allen's appointment was controversial due to his strong ties to the Seventh-day Adventist Church, and because of concerns that he would be unable to attend functions on Saturdays due to his faith's strict observation of the Sabbath. Allen resigned from his leadership of the West Indies Union prior to becoming Governor-General, however.

== Early life ==
Patrick Linton Allen was born in Fruitful Vale, Portland, on 7 February 1951. He was the fourth of five children to Ferdinand Allen, a farmer, and Christiana Allen (née Grant), a housewife. His parents were subsistence farmers in a region that had been devastated by Hurricane Charlie around the time of his birth. Allen attended the Fruitful Vale All-Age School as a child. Beginning at grade one, Allen was a year ahead in school.

Allen had initially intended to study to become a minister, but after his father became too ill to work, he instead went into teaching. He became a member of Fruitful Vale All-Age's teaching staff at age 17. Two years later, and following the death of his father, Allen went to Moneague Teachers' College to receive formal training in teaching. He became a teacher at an All-Age school in Saint Mary Parish after graduation. Between 1979 and 1983, Allen served as the principal at a succession of schools; Robins Bay All-Age School, Hillside Primary School, and finally Port Maria High School.

== Adventist leader ==
Allen first requested to be baptised when he was nine, but his family was initially resistant to the idea. On 15 September 1962, at age eleven, Allen was baptised by the Seventh-day Adventist Church. While still a teacher, Allen was trained and ordained as an Elder, and was encouraged to become a pastor. After over a decade in education, Allen left his teaching career and travelled to Andrews University in the United States where he received a Bachelor of Arts in History and Religion in 1985 and a Master of Arts in Systematic Theology a year later.

Allen returned to Jamaica to serve as a pastor, and was given increasing leadership responsibilities within the broader Seventh-day Adventist Church. Allen was appointed as the Director of Education and Communications within the Central Jamaica Conference of Seventh-day Adventists, one of five regional conferences within Jamaica. He later served as the Director of Education and Family Life for the West Indies Union of Seventh-day Adventists, which at the time had jurisdiction over Jamaica, The Bahamas, the Cayman Islands, and the Turks and Caicos Islands.^{[A]} In 1993, he returned to Andrews University, where he worked in the registrar's office while pursuing a doctorate in Educational Administration and Supervision. After receiving his doctorate in 1998, Allen returned to Jamaica, where he became the President of the Central Jamaica Conference, and in 2000, the President of the West Indies Union of Seventh-day Adventists. In 2005, he was elected to a second five-year term. In his acceptance speech, Allen opined that church outreach should address the problems facing the community, including the HIV/AIDS epidemic, domestic abuse, teenage pregnancy, unemployment, and violent crime. During this time, Allen also served as the chairman of the boards of Northern Caribbean University and Andrews Memorial Hospital.

== Governor-General ==
Viceregal styles of Sir Patrick Allen (2009–present)
- Reference style: His Excellency the Most Honourable
- Spoken style: Your Excellency

In July 2008, the then Governor-General of Jamaica Kenneth O. Hall, indicated that he wished to step down due to declining health. He was persuaded to remain in the post for an additional half-year. On 13 January 2009, the Prime Minister of Jamaica, Bruce Golding (of the Jamaica Labour Party), announced that Allen would succeed Kenneth Hall as Governor-General. The announcement generated controversy, both because Allen had strong ties to the Seventh-day Adventist Church, and because as an Adventist, Allen might be unable to attend events due to his strict observation of the Sabbath. On 28 January 2009, Allen resigned from his presidency of the West Indies Union. He also resigned as chairman of the board of Northern Caribbean University, and other religious organisations, in 2009.

On 26 February 2009, he became Jamaica's sixth appointed Governor-General, and eighth overall (two people briefly held the position as acting Governor-General). Although Seventh-day Adventism is Jamaica's largest religion, Allen was the first Adventist governor-general in Jamaica and the second in the region, after James Carlisle, a former governor-general of Antigua and Barbuda. There is a long history of appointing former educators to the position, with governors-general Campbell, Glasspole, Cooke, and Hall all also having backgrounds as educators.

In 2026, Sir Patrick Allen wrote an address and it was published during Jamaica's National Heritage Week. In it, he praised their forbearers and encouraged the public to think of the legacy they will all leave behind. "Let us build a Jamaica in which our children and grandchildren can look back upon our generation with the same pride with which we remember those who came before us."

Allen meeting President Ram Nath Kovind of India at King's House, May 2022

== Honours ==
In 2006, Allen was appointed a Commander of the Jamaican Order of Distinction (CD). Upon becoming the Governor-General, Allen was made a Member of the Jamaican Order of the Nation (ON). In May 2009, Allen was appointed a Knight Grand Cross of the Order of St Michael and St George (GCMG) by Queen Elizabeth II, with the appointment backdated to 26 March 2009. On 2 September 2013, Allen became a Knight of Grace of the Venerable Order of Saint John (KStJ).

== Awards ==
Allen has received an Honorary Doctor of Public Service from Northern Caribbean University and an Honorary Doctor of Laws from Andrews University as well Oakwood University. All three institutions are associated with the Seventh-day Adventist Church.

== Notes ==
^A Information about the regional structure of the Seventh-day Adventist Church is from the article "Jamaican Adventists on their own".

Government offices
Preceded by Kenneth O. Hall	Governor General of Jamaica; 2009–present	Incumbent
