= John Lucie-Smith =

Sir John Lucie-Smith CMG

Chief Justice of Jamaica
- In office 1869–1883
- Preceded by: Sir Bryan Edwards
- Succeeded by: Sir Adam Gibb Ellis

Personal details
- Born: 1825 Demerara, British Guiana
- Died: 9 July 1883 (aged 57–58) West Worthing, Sussex
- Spouse: Marie van Waterschoodt (m. 1851; died 1883)
- Relations: Euan Lucie-Smith (grandson)
- Children: John Barkley Lucie-Smith; Alfred Lucie-Smith
- Parent(s): John Lucie Smith; Martha Bean

Sir John Lucie-Smith III, CMG (1825 – 9 July 1883) was a British Guyanese lawyer who served as Chief Justice of Jamaica.

== Early life ==
He was born in 1825 in Demerara, British Guiana. He was the son of lawyer John Lucie-Smith Jr., (1795–1844) and Martha Bean (1805–1880). Among his siblings were sister, Martha Agnes Jean Lucie-Smith (who married George Smith Bascom), and brother, Sir William Frederick Haynes-Smith, who variously served as Attorney General of British Guiana, Governor of Antigua and Barbuda and the Bahamas, and High Commissioner of Cyprus. His father lived in Georgetown and had a plantation in Vreed en Hoop.

His paternal grandparents were John Lucie-Smith Sr. and Anna Agnes (née McLaurin) Lucie-Smith. His maternal grandparents were Charles Bean of Richmond, Surrey, and Magdalena Susanna van der Linde.

== Career ==
Lucie-Smith trained for the law at the Middle Temple in London, where he was called to the bar in 1849. He returned to practise as a lawyer in British Guiana and was appointed Solicitor-General of the country in 1852. In 1855, he was appointed Attorney-General of British Guiana, serving until 1859.

Appointed Chief Justice of Jamaica in 1869 he was awarded CMG in the 1869 Birthday Honours and knighted in 1870.

== Personal life ==
On 1 March 1851 he married Marie van Waterschoodt (1836–1915), the eldest daughter of Jean B. van Waterschoodt. Together, they were the parents of:

- John Barkley Lucie-Smith (1852–1915), the Postmaster General of Jamaica from 1905 to 1915; he married Catherine Peynado Burke, the daughter of Samuel Constantine Burke, in 1884.
- Sir Alfred Van Waterschoodt Lucie-Smith (1854–1947), also a colonial judge; he married Rose Alice Aves, seventh daughter of Edward Leopold Aves in 1885. After her death, he married Mary Meta Ruth Palmer Ross, a daughter of Sir David Palmer Ross, in 1901.

He died at Chipton, in West Worthing, Sussex on 9 July 1883.

=== Descendants ===
Through his son Alfred, he was a grandfather of John Lucie-Smith, who also served as a judge and was Chief Justice of Sierra Leone.

Through his son John, he was a grandfather of Euan Lucie-Smith, who was one of the first mixed-heritage infantry officers in a regular British Army regiment, and the first killed in World War I.
