= William Haynes-Smith =

English colonial administrator

Sir William Haynes-Smith KCMG

High Commissioner of Cyprus
- In office 23 April 1898 – 17 October 1904
- Preceded by: Sir Walter Joseph Sendall
- Succeeded by: Sir Charles King-Harman

Governor of the Bahamas
- In office 1895–1898
- Monarch: Victoria
- Preceded by: Sir Ambrose Shea
- Succeeded by: Sir Gilbert Thomas Carter

Governor of Antigua and Barbuda
- In office 1888–1895
- Preceded by: Sir Charles Mitchell
- Succeeded by: Sir Francis Fleming

Acting Governor of British Guiana
- In office 26 April 1884 – 1884
- Monarch: Victoria
- Preceded by: Sir Henry Turner Irving
- Succeeded by: Sir Henry Turner Irving

Attorney General of British Guiana
- In office 1874–1888
- Preceded by: Joseph Trounsell Gilbert
- Succeeded by: John Worrell Carrington

Personal details
- Born: William Frederick Haynes-Smith; 26 June 1839; Blackheath, Kent
- Died: 18 December 1928 (aged 89); Bradford-on-Avon, Wiltshire
- Spouse: Ellen Parkinson White (m. 1867; died 1923)
- Relations: Michael Villiers (grandson); Sir Alfred Lucie-Smith (brother)
- Parent(s): Sir John Lucie-Smith; Marie van Waterschoodt

Sir William Frederick Haynes-Smith KCMG (26 June 1839 – 18 December 1928) was an English colonial administrator in the British Empire.

== Early life ==
Haynes-Smith was born in Blackheath, Kent on 26 June 1839. He was the fifth son of John Lucie Smith L.L.D. and Martha Bean. He was Uncle to Sir Alfred Lucie-Smith, who was also a colonial judge who married first Rose Alice Emerentiana Aves and second Meta Mary Ross (a daughter of Sir David Palmer Ross).

== Career ==
He was called to the Bar by the Middle Temple in 1863, and shortly after was sent to British Guiana as Solicitor-General. In 1874, he was appointed Attorney-General. A decade later, he served as acting Governor for a few months, which he also did 1887. In November 1888, he was appointed Governor of the Leeward Islands, followed by a transfer to the Bahamas in 1895. He served as High Commissioner of Cyprus from 1898 to 1904.

He was appointed a Companion of the Order of St Michael and St George in 1887, and knighted in the same order in 1890.

== Personal life ==
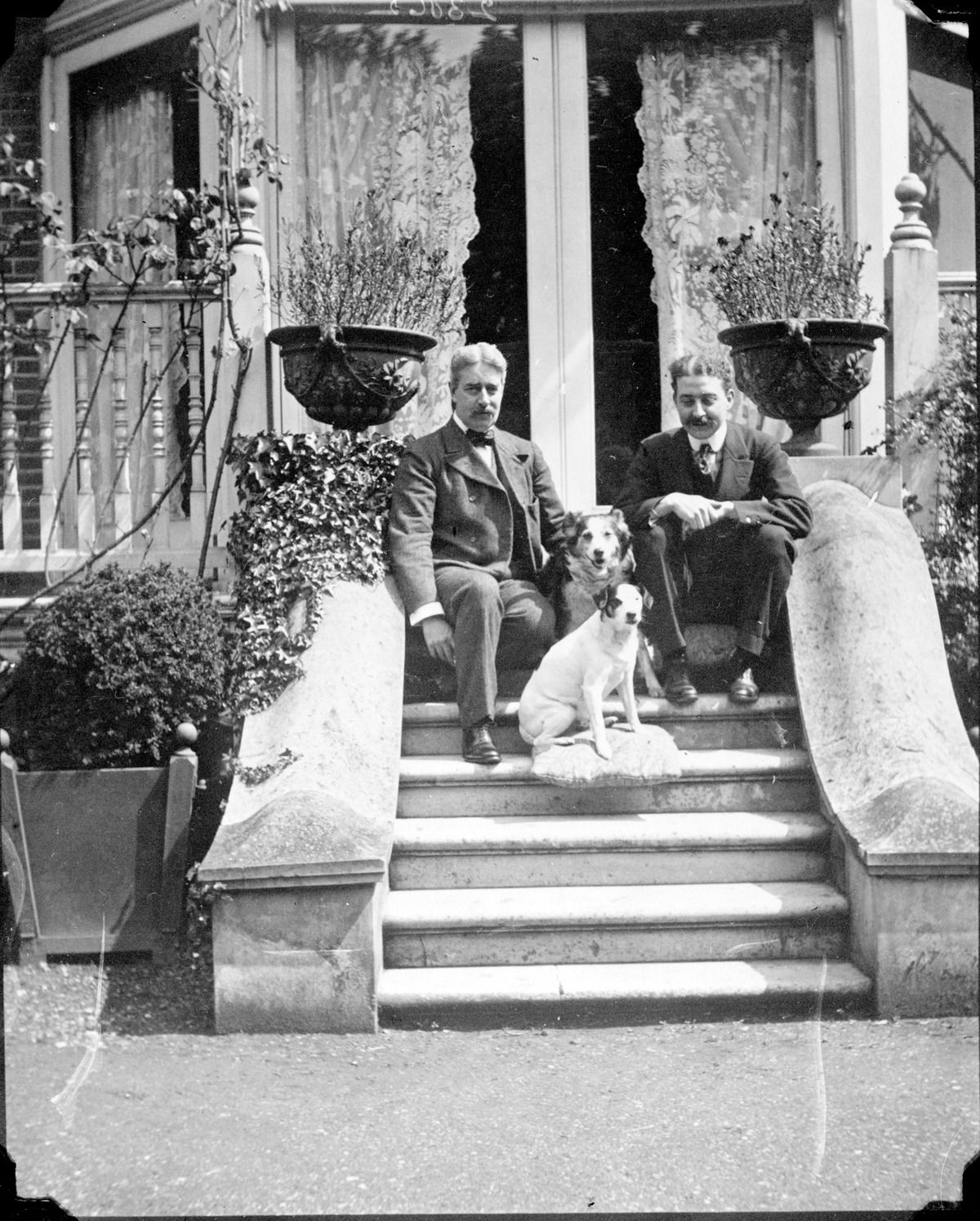
Photograph of Howard Sturgis and his son, William Haynes-Smith on the steps at Queen's Acres, Windsor, before 1920.

In 1867, he was married to Ellen Parkinson White (1838–1923) at Tunbridge Wells. Ellen was a daughter of English-born James Thomas White (son of Dr. Andrew White FRCS) and Anne Gordon Hubbard (daughter of John Hubbard and Jane (née Parkinson) Hubbard). Ellen's aunt, Mary Greene Hubbard, was the second wife of Russell Sturgis, an American merchant and banker who was the head of Baring Brothers in London. Together, they were the parents of a son and a daughter:

- William Haynes-Smith (1871–1937), who was the partner of writer Howard Sturgis (a son of Russell Sturgis from his third wife) until his death in 1920. In 1924, when both were in their 50s, he married Alice Maud Russell Sturgis (1868–1964), a daughter of American architect John Hubbard Sturgis and the niece of his later partner.
- Anne Haynes-Smith (1870–1963), who married Rear Admiral Edward Cecil Villiers, a son of Rev. Charles Villiers and Florence Mary Tyssen-Amherst. His brother was Ernest Villiers, MP for Brighton (and husband of Hon. Elaine Guest, daughter of Ivor Guest, 1st Baron Wimborne). He was a grandson of Thomas Hyde Villiers, great-grandson of the Hon. George Villiers, and a 2x great-grandson of Thomas Villiers, 1st Earl of Clarendon.

In 1920, he purchased Brandon Park in Suffolk. He died at Turleigh Mill in Bradford-on-Avon, Wiltshire on 18 December 1928.

=== Descendants ===
Through his daughter Anne, he was a grandfather of Vice Admiral Sir Michael Villiers, the Fourth Sea Lord and Vice Controller of the Navy.

== Appointments ==
- 1874–1888 Attorney General of British Guiana.
- 1884 Governor of British Guiana, acting for Sir Henry Turner Irving
- 1888–1895 Governor of Antigua and Barbuda
- 1895–1898 Governor of the Bahamas and of the Leeward Islands
- 1898–1904 High Commissioner of Cyprus
