= Gun Court =

Jamaican court for trialing firearm criminal cases

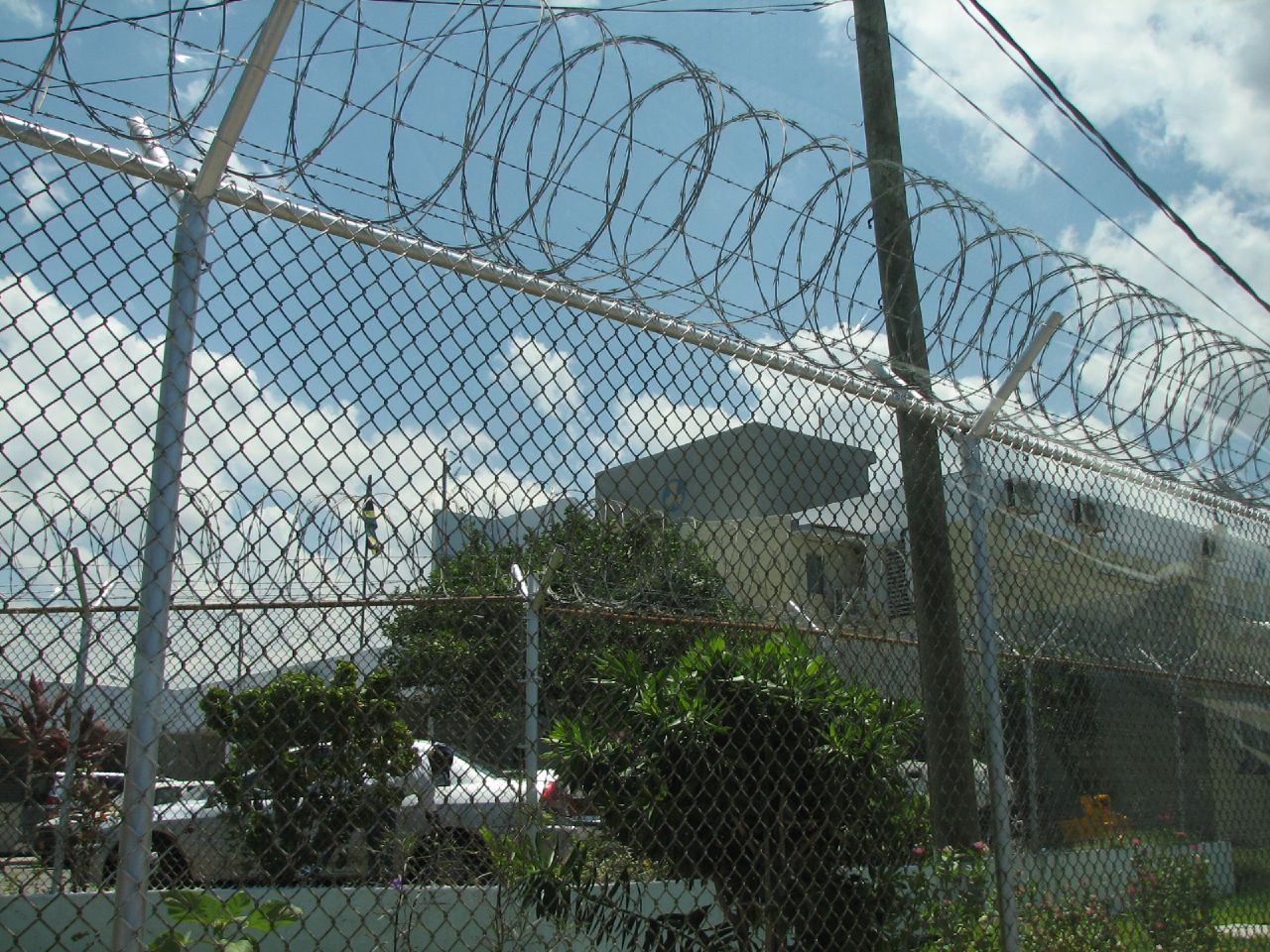
South Camp Adult Correctional Centre, also known as the Gun Court prison

The Gun Court is the branch of the Jamaican judicial system that tries criminal cases involving firearms. The court was established by Parliament in 1974 to combat rising gun violence, and empowered to try suspects in camera, without a jury. The Supreme Court, Circuit Courts, and Resident Magistrate's Courts function as Gun Courts whenever they hear firearms cases. There is also a Western Regional Gun Court in Montego Bay. Those convicted by the Gun Court are imprisoned in a dedicated prison compound at South Camp in Kingston. Until 1999, the Gun Court sessions were also held in the same facility.

The long sentences of the Gun Court and its restrictions on the rights of the accused have given rise to constitutional challenges, some of which have been appealed to the Privy Council in London. These cases have resulted in some modifications to the court, but have upheld it on the whole. The Gun Court system has also been the target of criticism because of its lengthy delay in hearing cases, and the continuing rise in gun violence since its adoption.

== Background ==
In the early 1970s, Jamaica experienced a rise in violence associated with criminal gangs and political polarization between supporters of the People's National Party and the Jamaica Labour Party. After a rash of killings of lawyers and businessmen in 1974, the government of Michael Manley attempted to restore order by granting broad new law enforcement powers in the Suppression of Crime Act and the Gun Court Act. The Suppression of Crime Act allowed the police and the military to work together in a novel way to disarm the people: soldiers sealed off entire neighbourhoods, and policemen systematically searched the houses inside for weapons without requiring a warrant. The goal was to expedite and improve enforcement of the 1967 Firearms Act, which imposed licensing requirements on ownership and possession of guns and ammunition, and prohibited automatic weapons entirely. Firearm licences in Jamaica require a background check, inspection and payment of a yearly fee, and can make legal gun ownership difficult for ordinary citizens. The new judicial procedures of the Gun Court Act were designed to ensure that firearms violations would be tried quickly and harshly punished.

Prime Minister Michael Manley expressed his determination to take stronger action against firearms, predicting that "It will be a long war. No country can win a war against crime overnight, but we shall win. By the time we have finished with them, Jamaican gunmen will be sorry they ever heard of a thing called a gun." In order to win this war, Manley believed it necessary to fully disarm the public: "There is no place in this society for the gun, now or ever."

== History ==
=== Establishment ===
The Gun Court Act and the Suppression of Crime Act were passed in special simultaneous sessions of the Senate and House of Representatives, and immediately signed into law by Governor-General Florizel Glasspole on 1 April 1974. The new court had several extraordinary features. Most trials were to be conducted in camera, without a jury and closed to the public and the press, in order to avoid problems of intimidation of witnesses and jurors. There was no provision for bail, either pre-trial or during appeal, since all defendants were considered dangerous. Most offences carried a single, mandatory sentence: indefinite imprisonment with hard labour. A convicted offender could be released only upon special decision of the Governor-General, advised by an appointed review board.

=== Legal challenges and amendments ===
The unusual features of the Gun Court have faced legal challenges, some of which have forced amendment of the Gun Court Act. The case Hinds et al. v. the Queen was an early test case for the new court. Four men, Moses Hinds, Henry Martin, Elkanah Hutchinson, and Samuel Thomas, had been arrested and convicted by the Gun Court in 1974 for possession of firearms and ammunition without a licence. They appealed their sentences to Jamaica's highest appellate court, the Court of Appeals, which initially declined to hear the case. However, they were allowed to apply to the Judicial Committee of the Privy Council in London, which agreed to review the legality of the Gun Court system.

The Constitution of Jamaica reserves certain serious crimes to the jurisdiction of the Supreme Court and its divisions. The Gun Court Act had established the Full Court division, with resident magistrates presiding, to try major firearms offences. The Privy Council held that this provision of the act improperly encroached on the jurisdiction reserved for the Supreme Court, and that the Full Court division was therefore unconstitutional. This fault was remedied in 1976 by replacing the Full Court division with a new High Court division, presided over by a single Supreme Court justice. The Privy Council also found that the institution of an appointed review board to determine the length of sentences was contrary to the doctrine of separation of powers fundamental to the Westminster system of government. According to this principle, sentencing in each particular case is a function of the judiciary, and cannot be assigned to any other body. The 1976 amendment eliminated the review board entirely, leaving life imprisonment without review as the only possible sentence.

Another case, Trevor Stone v. the Queen, challenged the denial of jury trial for most gun offences. It was argued that trial by jury is a fundamental and constitutional right guaranteed by tradition in English common law. The Jamaican Court of Appeals rejected this argument in a decision written by Court President Ira DeCordova Rowe in 1980. The court noted that the written Constitution adopted by Jamaica upon independence guaranteed certain rights to criminal defendants, but omitted trial by jury. This case confirmed the Gun Court's power to try all non-capital cases before judges alone.

The case of Herbert Bell v. Director of Public Prosecutions, concerning the right to a speedy trial, reached the Privy Council in 1983. The defendant had been held awaiting trial for several years, but the state ultimately failed to present any evidence or witnesses. When he was again arrested on the same firearms charges, he filed suit arguing that the Gun Court had violated his constitutional rights through unreasonable delay. The Privy Council agreed, ruling that even when prevailing local standards were taken into account, Bell's trial had been excessively delayed through no fault of his own.

The Gun Court Amendment Act of 1983 allowed Resident Magistrates to grant pre-trial bail, and to decide whether to keep firearms cases in the Resident Magistrate's Court or to send them to the High Court division of the Gun Court. Judges were given the power to set sentences other than life imprisonment. Cases involving defendants under 14 years old were directed to juvenile courts, instead of being heard by the ordinary Gun Court, and many young convicts serving indefinite sentences were released.

== Structure ==
=== Divisions ===
The Gun Court has three divisions: the Resident Magistrate's Division, the High Court Division, and the Circuit Court Division. The three divisions differ in their jurisdictions and procedures. When someone is charged with a firearm violation, whether by unlicensed possession alone or by use of a gun in commission of a crime, the case is ordinarily sent to the High Court Division. These cases are tried in camera by a justice of the Supreme Court of Jamaica, without a jury. The exceptions are charges of murder and treason. As capital offences, these require a jury trial. Charges of murder or treason using firearms are given preliminary investigation by a single resident magistrate in the Resident Magistrate's Division of the Gun Court, in camera. They are then sent to the Gun Court's Circuit Court Division. A Supreme Court justice presides over a jury trial, "exercising the jurisdiction of a Circuit Court". The Circuit Court Division therefore differs from the other divisions of the Gun Court in practising jury trial.

The Gun Court Act originally instituted a Full Court Division, in which cases were to be heard by a panel of three Resident Magistrates. This was replaced by the High Court Division after the Privy Council struck down the Full Court Division in the Hinds case, as judges of the lower levels of the judiciary were not empowered by the Constitution to try serious offences.

=== Western Regional Gun Court ===
In 1999, Parliament established a Western Regional Gun Court with its own Resident Magistrate's, High Court, and Circuit Court divisions, in parallel with the jurisdictions and powers of the central Gun Court divisions. Cases arising in four western parishes, Hanover, Trelawny, Saint James, and Westmoreland, are heard in the Regional Court. The Regional Gun Court sits in Montego Bay, in the court facilities of the St. James Resident Magistrate's Court. The regional court has been a success, avoiding the chronic backlogs that affect the central Gun Court.

=== South Camp compound ===
At the establishment of the new court in 1974, the Manley administration quickly build a new Gun Court compound (17°59′5″N 76°46′43″W) at South Camp Road, Kingston, with both court and prison facilities. The Gun Court Prison was defended by guard towers and barbed wire, earning it the nickname of "Jamaica's Stalag 17", and the walls were painted bright red "to show that it [is] dread". It held 320 inmates in 1986. The courtrooms housed the High Court and Resident Magistrate's divisions of the Gun Court until 1999, when they were converted to a "Peace Centre" dedicated to pursuing community mediation of disputes. The High Court division now sits in the Supreme Court building, and the Resident Magistrate's division sits in the Half Way Tree Courthouse. The prison itself remains in operation as the South Camp Adult Correctional Centre, housing inmates convicted by the Gun Court.

== Criticism ==
The Gun Court has faced criticism on several fronts, most notably for its departure from traditional practices, for its large backlog of cases, and for the continuing escalation in gun violence since its institution.

At the time of the 1976 amendments to the act, the Jamaican Bar Association protested against the lack of jury trials and the harsh mandatory sentences. According to a report in the Virgin Islands Daily News, the Association's Bar Council objected to the possibility that children as young as 12 could be imprisoned for life, without release or appeal, for small offences such as being found with used ammunition. The abrogation of jury trial has also been criticized by attorney and law professor David Rowe, the son of the Appeals Court justice who wrote the decision in the Stone case upholding the practice. Rowe argues that the common-law right to a jury trial is implied in the Constitutional provision for "a fair hearing within a reasonable time, by an independent and impartial court established by law", concluding that the Constitution had been "shorn of its most potent and ancient safeguard, trial by jury".

The 1993 County Report on Human Rights Practices in Jamaica from the United States Department of State noted the denial of a "fair public trial" and alleged that Gun Court trials observe "less rigorous rules of evidence than in regular court proceedings". The Canadian Bar Association's Jamaican Justice System Reform Task Force, in its preliminary recommendations, noted that the Gun Court is overloaded, that defendants are not well represented, and Crown attorneys are often inexperienced. The report recommended that trials no longer be held in camera, and that cases be moved to the ordinary Circuit Court to relieve the overburdened Gun Court. It did not take issue with non-jury trials, suggesting that the same practice might be used in more types of cases for greater efficiency.

Although the Gun Court was intended to expedite cases, bringing defendants to trial within seven days, defendants now often wait several years. The backlog was nearing 1000 cases in 1998, and in the 2003-2004 court year, the High Court division carried forward 3,367 cases already on the docket, added 613 new cases, and concluded 462. Senior Resident Magistrate Glenn Brown expressed dissatisfaction with the public prosecutors for taking too long to prepare cases, often because of difficulty in finding and bringing witnesses. Brown noted that "Seventy per cent of the persons who are before the courts have been here for an inordinately long period of time - three to four years."

The Gun Court system has been put forth by gun ownership advocates as an example of a failed regime of gun control. In an essay in the National Review in 2001, Dave Kopel argued that "[t]he Gun Court took guns only out of the hands of Jamaica's law-abiding, leaving them at the mercy of the criminals and the state." John R. Lott has argued that "gun-control laws have failed to deliver as promised", noting that the murder rate in Jamaica was lower before the introduction of stricter gun control: it rose from 11.5 to 19.5 per 100,000 between 1973 and 1977, and reached 41.7 per 100,000 in 1980. By 2007 the rate had risen to 1,574 murders in the calendar year, or 59 per 100,000 inhabitants.

== Gun Court in music ==
Several Jamaican musicians have sung about the Gun Court, including Junior Reid (Gun Court, 1993) and the dance hall artist Ranking Joe, whose first single release was "Gun Court Law" in 1974. The reggae musician Jah Cure released his first album, Free Jah's Cure, from Tower Street Prison in 2000 after having been convicted before the Gun Court in 1998. Jah Cure continued to deny the charges of illegal firearms, rape, and robbery, and he attracted widespread support for his release, including "Free Jah Cure" campaigns and petition drives, until his release in 2007.

The French singer Bernard Lavilliers sings about Gun Court in the song "Stand the Ghetto" released in 1980. He says, in French "pour le flingue dans ta poche, t'es coincé à Gun Court" ("because of the gun in your pocket, you are stuck at Gun Court").

The Jamaican dancehall artist Agent Sasco released a song called "Banks of the Hope" in 2018 where he mentioned "Gun Court". He says, In Patwa language "Yow it is a miracle Fi mek yuh thing shot An' nuh end up a' Gun Court End up a' Gun Court".

== See also ==
- Gun politics in Jamaica
