= Phil Ward =

Phil, Philip or Phillip Ward may refer to:

- Philip Ward (1924–2003), Welsh Guards officer in the British Army
- Philip Henry Ward Jr. (1886–1963), American stamp dealer
- Philip Ward (judge), Chief Justice of Jamaica in 1661
- Phil Ward, Australian creator of Phil Ward Racing
- Phil Ward, member of the Editorial Advisory Council of Inside GNSS
- Phillip Ward (born 1974), American football player
- Phillip Ward (City of Sydney) a ward of the Sydney City Council

== See also ==
- Philippe Ward (1958–2025), French novelist
