= Postmaster General of Jamaica =

This is a list of Postmasters General of Jamaica from 1671 to its independence from the United Kingdom in 1962 and to date.

== History ==
Prior to 1860, the Postmasters General for Jamaica were appointed by the Postmaster General in London, and their appointments would not appear in the Government lists when made.

== List of Postmasters General ==
Name	Term of office		Notes
Name	Took office	Left office	
1671		Gabriel Martin	Appointed by the Legislative Council of Jamaica on 31 October 1671.
1687		James Wales	Appointed by the Earl of Rochester (Postmaster General) in November 1687.
1691	1700	Thomas Neale	Appointed by a Crown patent dated 17 February 1691 to Postmaster of the North American colonies.
1700	1701	Andrew Hamilton; Robert West	Joint administration assigned by Thomas Neale.
1702	1711	Thomas Wood	Appointed by Edmund Dummer.
1721		Robert Baldwyn; John Cleaves; Gilbert Kennedy	All three were arrested in 1721 and charged with "exacting money for letters"; they were likely Acting Postmasters.
c. 1725	c. 1726	Thomas Bartlet	Was accused of "extorting money for letters" as deputies of the Post Office in England.
1735	1737	Alexander MacFarlane	Appointed by warrant from Alexander Spotswood (Deputy Postmaster General in the Americas).
1744		James Angus; Peter Baldwin; Robert Baldwin	All three were charged with extortion; they were likely Acting Postmasters.
1747		Lawrence Brodbelt	
1749	1749	John MacCulloch	Appointed by warrant from Elliot Benger (Deputy Postmaster General in the Americas) date 23 August 1749; he died shortly thereafter.
1749	1751	Mrs. Anna MacCulloch	Appointed by warrant from the Governor upon the death of her husband.
1751	1754	William Graham	
1754	1781	Edward Dismore	Appointed by the Postmaster General in April 1754.
1758	1759	Robert Lock	Appointed, locally, in place of Edward Dismore, on 19 October 1758; the appointment was deemed unlawful on 15 December 1759.
1782		Thomas Gray	
1783	1793	Francis Dashwood	Appointment was made with a salary was £150 per annum (although to receive it, he reportedly paid £300 per annum to a friend of Lord Carteret (Postmaster General)). (Note: Francis Dashwood (1751–1793) was born in Somerset, England to Robert Dashwood and Hon. Mary Sweeting. His younger brother was Vice-Admiral Sir Charles Dashwood. Francis married Frances Ludlow and had one child.)
1793		George Brooks	
1794		George Atkinson	
1795		George Bogle	
1796	1799	Glocester Wilson	
1800	1806	John Smith	
1807	1809	Benjamin Barbauld	
1810	1817	John Milbourne Marsh	
1822		David Watt (Acting)	
1823		John Wilson (Acting)	
1824	1832	William Jekyll Anstey	Appointed Postmaster of Bath on 18 October 1832 before being dismissed on 29 November 1833. (Note: Blue Book for 1834 states: Anstey as DPMG but absent from Colony for whole year. Correspondence from him in West Sussex Archives to Lord Richmond.)
1833		John Morce (Acting)	
1833		Samuel Le Fevre	Declined appointment.
1833	1834	Samuel McQuoid (Note: Samuel McQuoid (c. 1796–1867).)	Appointment cancelled.
1834	1834	Lord Sussex Lennox	Brother of the 5th Duke of Richmond (Postmaster General). (Note: Blue Book for 1834 states: Lord Sussex Lennox (1802–1874) was absent from Colony from November 1834.)
1834	1850	John Wilson	Appointed by the 2nd Marquess Conyngham on 20 October 1834 at a salary of £400 per annum, which increased to £1,500 in 1844.
1850	1860	Maurice O'Connor Morris	Dismissed on 31 July 1860.
1860	1867/8	Alexander James Brymer	First official Colonial appointment to the office.
1868	1870	William Kemble	Appointed 1 March 1868 at a salary of £600 per annum; Resigned on 20 April 1870 with a pension of £180 per annum.
1870	1891	Frederick Sullivan	Appointed 1 May 1870 and served until 31 October 1891; previously Chief Clerk from 1861 to 1870 and Acting Postmaster General in 1869. (Note: Frederick Sullivan (1835–1892) was the son of John Augustus Sullivan and grandson of John Sullivan of Richings Park. He was the son-in-law of his predecessor, William Kemble.)
1891	1903	George Henry Pearce	
1903	1905	Alfred Henry Miles	
1905	1915	John Barkley Lucie-Smith	(Note: John Barkley Lucie-Smith (1852–1915) was the son of John Lucie-Smith, Chief Justice of Jamaica, brother to Alfred Lucie-Smith, and father of Euan Lucie-Smith.)
1915	1925	Ellis Wolfe	
1925	1937	Reginald Honan Fletcher	Served as wartime postal censor.
1938	1945	William Alexander Campbell	Confirmed as Postmaster on 29 June 1939.
1945	1949	Esric Lionel Morris	
1949	1953	George Fitzgerald White	Served as wartime postal censor.
1954	1955	Allison Alfred Vernon Nash	
1955	1959	Joseph Green	
1960	1964	F. O. Rousseau	
1965	1968	Harrington A. Fairweather	Appointed on 15 February 1965.
1968	1973	Winston G. Brown	
1974	1978	Rupert I. Knight	
1978	1979	K. L. DePass	
1979	1984	Hicks (HM) Williams	Appointed Postmaster General by 13 November 1979; previously Acting Postmaster General by 14 May 1979.
1984	2000	Sam E. Stewart	
2000	2005	Dr. Blossom O'Meally Nelson	
2006		Michael Gentles	
2021		Lincoln A. Allen	

== See also ==
- Postage stamps and postal history of Jamaica
