= Henckel =

Henckel is a surname. Notable people with the surname include:

- Anthony Jacob Henckel (1668–1728), German theologian who founded the first Lutheran church in North America
- Frithjof Henckel (born 1950), German rower
- Joachim Friedrich Henckel (1712–1779), Prussian surgeon at Charité hospital in Berlin
- Johann Friedrich Henckel (1678–1744), Prussian physician, chemist, metallurgist, and mineralogist
- John Henckel, Chief Justice of Jamaica in 1801
- Valdemar Henckel (1877–1953), Danish businessman and real estate developer

== See also ==
- Henckel-Rennen, a horse race in Germany
- Heinkel
- Henkel
