= Roger Elletson =

Roger Elletson may refer to:

- Roger Elletson (judge), chief justice of Jamaica, 1689
- Roger Hope Elletson (1727–1775), Jamaican planter and politician
