= Justice Wolfe =

Justice Wolfe may refer to:

- Arthur Wolfe, 1st Viscount Kilwarden (1739–1803), Lord Chief Justice of Ireland
- James H. Wolfe (1884–1958), a chief justice of the Utah Supreme Court
- Lensley Wolfe (1937–2023), a chief justice of Jamaica
