= David P. Rowe =

David Patrick Rowe (May 8, 1959 – January 12, 2018) was a Jamaican-American lawyer, professor, media commentator, corruption watchdog, Commonwealth Caribbean country risk analyst and pioneer in the area of transnational law. He has spent most of his career as a litigator in Florida, along with serving as an adjunct professor at the University of Miami School of Law since 1989. He is one of the world's leading voices on the law of the Commonwealth Caribbean and the political economy of the wider Caribbean region, and his scholarly work and quotations have appeared in periodicals around the world. He is also frequently used as a media consultant with international publications, including the Miami Herald and The New York Times, among others.

== Early life ==
Rowe was born to Ira DeCordova Rowe, KC OJ the president of the Courts of Appeal of Jamaica and Belize, along with a member of the Court of Appeal of Belize and of the Bahamas. Rowe's mother, Audrey Stewart, was a sister tutor at the Nursing School of the University of the West Indies. Rowe attended the Wolmer's School in Kingston, where he was awarded the Sydney McDonald Award upon graduation.

== Education ==
In 1977, Rowe received the Exhibition Scholarship of Law from the University of the West Indies. He received his LLB from the University of the West Indies (UWI) at Cave Hill, Barbados, in 1980, and received his Juris Doctor from the University of Miami School of Law in 1982. He was also a Rhodes Scholarship finalist for Jamaica in 1980 and 1981. While at UWI, he was active in Amnesty International adoption group.

== Career ==
Rowe is a member of the Florida Bar and the Jamaica Bar. He began his career as an associate at the law firm Greenberg Traurig in Miami, from 1982 to 1984, until he was hired by Holland & Knight. At Greenberg, he worked with former US Ambassador Ambler Moss and former Florida Governor Reubin Askew. Rowe worked for Holland & Knight from 1984 to 1990, becoming a capital partner in 1988. At Holland, he worked with Chesterfield Smith, the former president of the American Bar Association, and Bill McBride. In 1991, he opened the law firm of David Rowe, P.A. Rowe has had success in federal and state court. He obtained acquittals in notable federal cases such as United States v. Joel Powell and United States v. Hargitay, along with state cases such as State of Florida v. Lucille Sapp and State of Florida v. Sean Perry. Rowe's expertise has seen him called as a witness to testify on the country conditions in Jamaica in several political asylum cases. He was the first chairman of the American Bar Association Caribbean Law Committee. He testified as an expert in United States federal practice in the case of Dabdoub v. Vaz, the historic dual-citizenship case in the Jamaica Supreme Court.

Rowe's first major criminal trial in US federal court was the landmark four-week trial of Nigel Bowe before Judge Lawrence King. Rowe used the Specialty Rule to dismiss 14 of the 15 charges. Bowe served eight years in federal detention, far fewer than the life sentences requested by federal prosecutors.

In 2011 Rowe represented Jamaican entertainer Moses Davis (Beenie Man) after Davis's visa was canceled by the United States Consulate in Jamaica. The visa was restored and Beenie Man issued a press release thanking Rowe on July 27, 2011.

Rowe has been relied upon in US federal court as an expert witness on Jamaican political and legal issues by attorneys representing clients facing Removal. Rowe has also been an attorney of choice for Jamaican entertainers with US immigration issues.

In November 2013, the Jamaican-American Bar Association recognized Rowe as an "elder statesman" of the Jamaican legal community in the United States and for being a "singular pioneer" for the trans-Caribbean practice.

In December 2013, Rowe was recognized by a group of leading Jamaican attorneys for his 30th year of membership at the Florida Bar, as reported in the Jamaica Observer

At the end of 2013, Rowe spearheaded the launch of a program distributing computer tablets to underprivileged youths in the Whitfield Town area of Kingston, as a tribute to his father's humble origins and academic excellence; "There is no reason why Kingston cannot be a hub of technological development", he said. Rowe was commended by the Kingston and St. Andrew Corporation for his community efforts.

In early 2014, Rowe received a special award for commitment from the board of directors of Temple Beth Ami of Boca Raton, Florida.

In 2014, Rowe was the lead defense lawyer in a prominent Florida first-degree murder case involving a "stand your ground" motion.

In early April 2014, Rowe commenced his representation of Damion St Patrick Baston in a landmark human trafficking case in US jurisprudence before federal Judge Cecelia Altonaga, as the US seeks extraterritorial implementation of its domestic anti-trafficking policy.

Rowe's defense was noted by the Miami Herald, when he argued that it was not a question of prostitution, but rather that there had been no coercion of any kind. Since prostitution in Australia was legal, he argued, the case was "much ado about nothing".

== University of Miami School of Law ==
Rowe is an adjunct law professor at the University of Miami School of Law, having taught at the law school since 1989. In 2010, the school announced it would be adding a second Caribbean law course, taught by Rowe, Caribbean Law II, which would focus on articles for publication in the university's new Caribbean Law Yearbook, co-founded by Rowe. Rowe coordinated the school's annual Marcus Garvey Seminar from 1999 to 2004, which commented on the teachings of Marcus Garvey and his legal and political philosophy. The seminar resumed at the University of Miami in the fall of 2012. At that seminar, Rowe called for a full presidential pardon for Garvey and called for the Jamaican government to have a portrait of Garvey in all government offices.

In 2013, at the invitation of Rowe, Jamaican Ambassador to the United States Stephen Vasciannie visited the law school and gave a lecture on the durability and stability of the Jamaican constitution.

In 2014, Rowe chaired the seventh Marcus Garvey Seminar, focused on Garvey's philosophy of Pan-Africanism and the history of its connection to constitutional development in the Commonwealth Caribbean.

== US-Jamaica extradition crisis ==
Rowe was one of the most outspoken advocates of the United States' stance in the Christopher Coke extradition crisis that began in the fall of 2009. During the crisis, he was a leading speaker on the issue, with his commentary appearing in news outlets such as the BBC, Radio Russia and Time. He also convened a symposium, the Caribbean Law Yearbook Conference, in November 2010, that was the first formal academic discussion of the events of the crisis. Rowe is a strong political supporter of the viability of the Westminster constitutional model, which prevails in Caribbean constitutions of the English-speaking West Indies. He is a vocal advocate of significant United States economic support and diplomatic influence in the Caribbean region. Rowe endorsed the literal interpretation of treaty text during the crisis: he said the country should adhere to its obligations under the bilateral extradition treaty. In September 2011, he wrote an op-ed in the Caribbean Journal about Coke's guilty plea in US federal court in New York. Many observers partially attribute the resignation of Prime Minister Bruce Golding to Rowe's specific incisive and investigative criticism on Jamaica radio of the political scandals in Golding's troubled four-year administration.

== Transnational dialogue ==
From 1984 to 1990, Rowe was the Registered Foreign Agent for Jamaica. While serving as Secretary to the Caribbean Research Development Foundation, Rowe, under the guidance of Sir Philip Sherlock, arranged for different Caribbean leaders to speak in Miami in the 1980s, including the Rt. Hon. Edward Seaga, Hon. Cheddi Jagan of Guyana, the Rt. Hon. P.J. Patterson of Jamaica and Sir Lynden Pindling of the Bahamas. With Hon. Marie Wray and Hon. John Atkins of the Jamaican Consulate in Miami, Rowe prepared the Draft Constitution for the Jamaica Diaspora Movement in 1990.

== Israel ==
Rowe, who is of Jewish descent through his maternal grandmother, has been one of the Caribbean's leading advocates for Israel, both from a pro-Zionist perspective and for the potential role Israel can play in helping to develop the Caribbean region.

== Major positions and commentary ==
Rowe's strong anti-corruption and pro law enforcement positions are reflected in his writings and lectures at the University of Miami School of Law. He has pioneered the development of the trans-national Caribbean law program at the university which has encouraged exchange of scholarship between West Indian and First World legal scholars. Rowe's thesis that Commonwealth Caribbean Governments should try to operate with First World ethical standards has influenced both US and Caribbean policy makers. Rowe is an expert in the US Foreign Corrupt Practices Act and its extra territorial application particularly in the Caribbean. Rowe has been qualified in US federal court on numerous occasions on the subject of political and legal conditions in the Caribbean.

A law reform advocate, Rowe has publicly recommended that campaign finance legislation be adopted in the Commonwealth Caribbean to regulate political lobbying and make bribery of local politicians illegal;however, Campaign finance remains an unregulated legislative area in Jamaica today. In 2012, in a public lecture at the Norman Manley Law School in Kingston Jamaica, Rowe recommended that Jamaica adopt a speedy trial law to reduce its huge back log of criminal law cases and to expedite the period of time that incarcerated individuals in Jamaica have to wait for trial. Rowe has also condemned anti-homophobic domestic violence and violence to children in Jamaica, and has urged successive Governments in Jamaica to adopt corrective measures. Rowe is also an outspoken critic of the high murder rate in Jamaica, and relates it to connections between criminal narcotic elements and the political establishment in Jamaica. Rowe endorses the theory of Oxford Professor A. R. Dicey and relates his principles of the rule of law to the Commonwealth Caribbean.

In his articles, Rowe supports Jamaica's membership in CARICOM and Jamaica's proposed affiliation to the Caribbean Court of Justice. Rowe has a strong pro-Israeli world outlook and is opposed to Caricom's recognition of Palestine in the United Nations. Rowe believes in binding political and economic bilateral ties between Israel and Jamaica. He has continued to campaign for a stronger bilateral relationship between Jamaica and Israel.

He has also written several articles documenting the urgent need for campaign finance reform in the Commonwealth Caribbean, particularly in Jamaica.

He has also written extensively on the issues of corruption in the Turks and Caicos Islands, originating in the Sir Robin Auld Commission of Inquiry and has become a leading voice on the legal and political developments of the Turks and Caicos.

In November 2013, speaking with Newstalk 94, a major Jamaican radio program, Rowe argued that, despite the Westminster Model and the two-party system, Section 80 of the Jamaican Constitution accommodated the possibility of Jamaica having a splintered, or "coalition" Opposition. He also said the Governor General would always be obligated to determine which party other than the ruling party had the largest number of members of parliament. This obligation, he said, existed independent of internal party relations or elections.

In a later interview with Newstalk, Rowe addressed the question of whether a Senator should resign after engaging in an ultimately unsuccessful challenge for leadership of the political party nominating him. He suggested that there was a Constitutional Convention in the Jamaican Constitution to the effect that a Senator should resign if there was evidence of a lack of confidence expressed in him or her by the Prime Minister or the Opposition Leader, because of the essential nature of the Senate as an upper house. He cited the derivative relationship of the Senate with the House of Lords and the Westminster model origin of the Jamaican constitution as a basis for his legal reasoning. Two days later came the resignation of former Senator Dr Christopher Tufton in a similar circumstance.

In a December 2013 Op-Ed in Caribbean Journal, Rowe identified the continued increase in the murder rate in Jamaica as a national crisis which required aggressive action by Prime Minister Portia Simpson Miller. An address by the Prime Minister a week later reflected what seemed to be a policy shift by Simpson Miller on the crime problem.

In April 2014, Rowe was an outspoken opponent of a controversial measure introduced by the Jamaican government that would have levied a tax on all withdrawals from banks. Within a week after he published a scholarly Video Op-Ed criticizing the government's thinking on the matter, the government announced that it would be withdrawing the tax.

== Caribbean Basin Security Initiative ==
Rowe is an outspoken advocate of the Caribbean Basin Security Initiative and the fight against transnational crime. In an interview with WLRN in September 2013, Rowe pointed to a Jamaican murder rate that was still "out of control".

On Monday, October 7, 2013, Rowe appeared on the Independent Talk program on Jamaica's Power 106 to discuss the impact of the Shanique Myrie case in the Caribbean Court of Justice. He said the decision also had to be jurisprudentially assessed in the framework of the Caribbean Basin Security Initiative, which sees drug smuggling as the biggest single threat to the domestic security of the region. He pointed out the US case Bell v. Wolfish, sets a standard of reasonable grounds for performing cavity searches was established, and recommended that the Bell standard be employed by Caribbean governments.

On October 8, 2013, in an interview with RJR 94 FM, Rowe emphasized the need for Commonwealth Caribbean governments to comply with the terms of the CBSI and its provisions relating to illicit drug trafficking and citizen security.

== Expert witness ==
Due to his internationally acknowledged expertise on political, human rights and constitutional developments in Jamaica, Rowe has become a leading expert witness in United States federal court cases involving Jamaica and more recently in cases in the United Kingdom as well. Most recently, he served as an expert witness on country conditions in Jamaica for the International Human Rights Clinic at the University of Chicago Law School. His expert testimony for that clinic played a role in helping to save a Jamaican man from likely deportation and torture. Also in 2013, he assisted the Center for Applied Legal Studies at the Georgetown University Law Center in a major case involving Jamaican country conditions.

In July 2013, Rowe testified as an expert witness in the landmark dual citizenship case in the Cayman Islands involving Cayman Cabinet Minister Tara Rivers. Rowe testified that a US passport application was not simply an administrative act, but was an affirmation of allegiance to the United States.

In December 2014, Rowe contributed expertise to a case involving the question of whether a removal of a Jamaican national back from the United States to Jamaica could be prevented under the terms of the United Nations Convention on Torture.

In 2015, in what could become a landmark case for immigration law with respect to Jamaican political asylum seekers and withholding and removal, Rowe testified to the political affiliation of many gangs in Jamaica. Rowe's testimony was cited by the Immigration Judge as crucial to his that a Jamaican national was entitled to asylum, fearing political violence against his family. In Re Glasford Davis could become a seminal case in future Jamaican asylum proceedings. Rowe was called as an expert witness by noted Miami attorney Kenneth Panzer.

In the summer of 2016, Rowe offered expert opinion in written testimony in a United Kingdom immigration tribunal involving the issue of an asylum request by a Jamaican national in England.

== Caribbean Law Yearbook ==
Rowe helped found the Caribbean Law Yearbook at the University of Miami School of Law, the first journal in the United States focusing entirely on the law of the Commonwealth Caribbean, which will be published in the spring of 2011. It was the subject of the 2011 Caribbean Law Yearbook Conference, which was aired on Jamaican television, and was addressed by the Hon. Peter Phillips, Jamaica's current Minister of Finance.

== Publications ==
In addition to his legal and political commentary, his work has been published in news outlets and journals, including "Debt Equity Reduction" in the International Law Yearbook and "The Abandonment Doctrine or Is Your Green Card Safe?" in Jamaca's Gleaner. He also has a regular column in the Jamaica Sunday Herald, and authored the article "Trial By Jury: Is Trial by Jury protected in the Jamaican Constitution".

Fundamentally influenced by the writings of Professor Ralph Carnegie, Lord Diplock and his father Ira D. Rowe, David Rowe has theorized in several articles that the retention of the Westminster model constitution is essential to peace and stability in the Commonwealth Caribbean.

Rowe is also a frequent op-ed contributor to the Caribbean Journal news site.

== Books ==
Rowe is the author of Ira Rowe: Caribbean Lawyer, which examines the life and career of his father from his beginnings as a Clerk of the Court to his rise to the presidency of the Court of Appeal of Belize and of Jamaica. It also takes the memories of those who knew him, including the Queen of the United Kingdom, who personally expressed her condolences upon his death through her Chief Clerk, Gill Middleburgh. In 2009 he published a short novella of Jamaican life called School Days, which examines racial and social attitudes in contemporary Jamaica.

In 2013, Rowe co-authored, with Niyala Harrison and Jason Frederick Emert, the authoritative Aspects of Jamaican Constitutional History, the first detailed legal analysis of the history of Jamaica's constitution. The book focuses on the application of the Westminster model to past and current Jamaican constitutional issues. The book was launched in Miami and Kingston in May 2013, including an event at the Hotel Four Seasons in Jamaica and subsequently distributed with a launch in Southeast St. Andrew a month later. In attendance were Kingston Mayor Angela Brown-Burke, constitutional scholars Abe Dabdoub and Lloyd Barnett and Ambassador Arnold Foote, current president of the World Federation of Consuls. In his speech at the launch, Rowe called for equal access to justice for all Jamaicans and use of the law to prevent violence to women and children in society. He also severely criticized the prevailing murder rate in Jamaica as being inconsistent with the Professor Dicey's rule of law concept.

Rowe's book was described in a review by the Jamaica Gleaner as an "epic 451-page work" which "explores the key movements and events in Jamaica's history."

== Television ==
Rowe is a frequent television commentator, including appearances on American Gangster. Most recently, he was a featured commentator for an A&E special on the 2010 Jamaican extradition crisis and the prosecution of Christopher Coke.

In January 2015, Rowe was interviewed extensively on an episode of 18 Degrees North, a Caribbean news magazine program, discussing the US-Jamaica relationship and issues relating to the synergy between US and Jamaican law enforcement.

== End of Life ==
David Patrick Rowe (Husband)(May 8, 1959 – January 12, 2018) Rosemarie Dorothea Robinson-Rowe (Wife)(March 3, 1956 - January 26, 2022)
