= Rowland Phillips (judge) =

Jamaican judge (1904-1976)

The Honourable Sir Rowland Ricketts Phillips

Chief Justice of Jamaica
- In office 1963–1968
- Preceded by: Sir Colin MacGregor
- Succeeded by: Sir Herbert Duffus

Personal details
- Born: 30 September 1904 Montego Bay, Colony of Jamaica, British Empire
- Died: 11 October 1976 (aged 72)
- Spouse: Enid Daphne Limonius (m. 1947)
- Parent: George Augustus Phillips (father)
- Occupation: Judge & Chief Justice

Sir Rowland Ricketts Phillips (30 September 1904 – 11 October 1976) was a Jamaican judge. He served as Chief Justice of Jamaica from 1963 to 1968.

== Early life and education ==
Rowland Ricketts Phillips was born in Montego Bay, Jamaica, on September 30, 1904. He was the son of George Augustus Phillips. Phillips attended Cornwall College.

== Legal career ==
Rowland Phillips was appointed Resident Magistrate in. He was elevated to serve as a Puisne Judge of the Supreme Court of Guyana on January 27, 1954. He was named a Puisne Judge of the Supreme Court of Jamaica on October 23, 1959. Phillips was sworn in as Acting Governor General on August 2, 1967 by then Governor General Sir Clifford Campbell.

== Personal life ==
In 1947, Phillips married Enid Daphne Limonius. He had four children, including two daughters: Ambassador Elinor Felix and Justice Hilary Phillips.: and two sons, Rowland (aka 'Rennie') and Geoffrey.

== Honors and awards ==
Rowland Phillips was knighted by Queen Elizabeth II on October 15, 1964.

Government offices
Preceded by Sir Colin MacGregor	Chief Justice of Jamaica; 1963-1968	Succeeded by Sir Herbert Duffus
