= Hilary Phillips =

Jamaican attorney-at-law and magistrate

Hilary Ann Phillips CD, QC

Judge of the Court of Appeal
- Incumbent
- Assumed office July 20, 2009

Personal details
- Born: 26 February 1951 (age 75) Kingston, Jamaica
- Education: University of the West Indies
- Awards: Order of Distinction (2013)

Hilary Ann Phillips CD, QC (born February 26, 1951) is a Jamaican attorney-at-law and magistrate. She has served as a judge of the Court of Appeal since 2009.

== Early life and education ==
Phillips was born in Kingston, Jamaica on February 26, 1951, to father Rowland Phillips and mother Enid Daphne Phillips (née Limonius). She attended the St Andrew High School and is a graduate of the University of the West Indies, where she received a Bachelor of Science degree in Management Studies. She also attended the College of Law of England and Wales where she qualified as a solicitor.

== Judicial career ==
Phillips was called to the Bar on August 8, 1974. She was appointed Queen's Counsel in April 1998. She is a member of the Bar Association of Jamaica, and served as its first female president from 2001 to 2004. Phillips worked at the Norman Manley Law School as a tutor in civil procedure since 1994. She has been a member of the General Legal Council since 1984, as well as a member of its disciplinary committee. She served as vice-president of the Organisation of Commonwealth Caribbean Bar Associations from 2003-2006. Phillips was a senior partner at the law firm Grant, Stuart, Phillips and Company. On July 20, 2009, she was sworn in as a Judge of the Court of Appeal by Governor General Sir Patrick Allen. She has also served as the acting President of the Court of Appeal.

== Honors and awards ==
Phillips was awarded the Order of Distinction, Commander class for services to the legal profession and to the judiciary in 2013.

== Personal life ==
Phillips is the daughter of the late Sir Rowland Phillips, Chief Justice of Jamaica (1963–1968).
