= Herbert Duffus =

Acting governor-general of Jamaica

Sir Herbert Duffus

Acting Governor-General of Jamaica
- In office 28 February 1973 – 27 June 1973
- Preceded by: Clifford Campbell
- Succeeded by: Florizel Glasspole

Chief Justice of Jamaica
- In office 1968–1973
- Preceded by: Rowland Phillips
- Succeeded by: Kenneth Smith

Personal details
- Born: Herbert George Holwell Duffus; 30 August 1908 Saint Ann's Bay, Colony of Jamaica, British Empire
- Died: 25 June 2002 (aged 93) Jamaica
- Education: Cornwall College

Sir Herbert George Holwell Duffus (30 August 1908 – 25 October 2002) was a Jamaican who served as the chief Justice of Jamaica and as acting governor-general of Jamaica.

== Early life ==
Duffus was born on 30 August 1908, in St. Ann's Bay, Jamaica, the son of William Alexander Duffus, JP, and his wife, Emily Mary Duffus (née Holwell). He attended Cornwall College in Jamaica from 1919 to 1924 and became a solicitor in the Supreme Court of Jamaica on 12 May 1930. From 1939 to 1943, he was the Commanding Captain of the Jamaican Home Guard in St. Thomas.

== Career ==
Duffus had a lengthy career in the judiciary, serving as Resident Magistrate (1946–58), Pusine Judge (1958–62), and Judge of Appeal (1962–64). From 1964 to 1967, he was President of the Court of Appeal. He was then appointed Chief Justice of Jamaica in 1968, serving in that capacity until 1973. Following the retirement of Clifford Campbell on 28 February 1973, Duffus was appointed acting governor-general of Jamaica until the role was assumed by Florizel Glasspole on 27 June 1973. He was knighted by Queen Elizabeth on 4 March 1966.

Following the events of "Bloody Sunday" in December 1973, President of Grenada Eric Gairy tasked Duffus with heading the Commission of Inquiry into the Breakdown of Law and Order and Police Brutality in Grenada. The committee, nicknamed the Duffus Commission, concluded its investigation on 16 May 1974.

== Personal life and death ==
Duffus married Elsie Mary Hollinsed on 10 June 1939. He died on 25 October 2002 aged 94. His younger brother, William Algernon Howell Duffus, born 13 August 1911, married Helen Hollinsed, sister of Elsie. They had 2 sons (both lawyers),:and one daughter. Sir William Duffus, who was knighted in 1966, had a similar career to his elder brother, Sir Herbert. He was a Justice of the Appeal Court, West Nigeria (1960-1964), President of the Court of: Appeal, East Nigeria, Africa (1970-1975). After 1975, he was Justice of the Appeal in the Bahamas and Turks and Caicos until his death on 10 February 1981.

Government offices
Preceded by Rowland Phillips	Chief Justice of Jamaica; 1968–1973	Succeeded by Kenneth Smith
