= Ira DeCordova Rowe =

Jurist

Ira Rowe representing Jamaica at the United Nations

Ira De Cordova Rowe, QC, OJ (8 February 1928 – 25 January 2004) was one of the jurists of the Commonwealth Caribbean. His decisions on Jamaican, Belizan and Bahamian Constitution Law created a new Commonwealth jurisprudence based on the Westminster Model with a strong reliance on the wording of the new Commonwealth Caribbean constitutions. Rowe's support for the Caribbean Court of Justice swayed many of the Court's initial critics. His belief in Caribbean law students inspired many young lawyers of Caribbean heritage. Judge Rowe thought that judges ought not to usurp the role of the legislator and based most of his published opinions on principles of English and Caribbean Law as laid down in precedents and statutes. He believed that the newly independent Caribbean nations needed efficient, practical legal systems based on certainty and stability.

He served as president of the Courts of Appeal in Jamaica, in Belize, in Grand Cayman, in the Bahamas and in the Turks and Caicos Islands. He served as Solicitor General of Jamaica.

Ira Rowe was extremely prominent in Caribbean jurisprudence during the last three decades of the twentieth century. He was the author of many significant decisions, including the Queen v Oliver Whylie, which codified the law of identification in the Caribbean; and Belize Alliance vs the Department of the Environment and Belize Electric Company Ltd., the most significant environmental decision in the Commonwealth Caribbean. His role in chairing the Family Law Committee in Jamaica led to the repeal of bastardy laws in Jamaica. Most other Caribbean Commonwealth jurisdictions followed.

== Biography ==
He was born in humble circumstances in Saint Elizabeth, Jamaica. His father, William Rowe, a tobacco farmer, traveled frequently to Cuba to sell tobacco to fund Ira's education at the Munro Boys' School in the Santa Cruz mountains of Jamaica. His mother Caroline Rowe was a teacher. Rowe's first job was as a reader to the village of Dalton of the World War II fortunes of the West India Regiments serving in Europe.

He served as an elementary school teacher and then as a Clerk of the Courts in Savanna-la-Mar, Jamaica, before traveling to England to read for the Bar at Lincoln's Inn in 1957. Thereafter he strictly applied the rules of the British bar to the rest of his professional life. In 1958 he married Audrey Rowe, a registered nurse, who died in 1998. His son David P. Rowe is a trial lawyer in South Florida, and his daughter Patricia, who also lives in Florida, is a pediatric physician.

Jamaica became independent in 1962 and Sir Alexander Bustamante sent the young Rowe to set up the first overseas passport office for Jamaica in the United Kingdom in 1964. While serving as legal attaché in the United Kingdom he rendered valuable legal advice to Lucky Gordon, a Jamaican involved with the Profumo scandal. Rowe was promoted and recalled to Jamaica in 1966 to serve as the country's delegate to the 21st Session of the General Assembly of the United Nations at the height of the Cold War. During that period he addressed the Assembly about racial dignity and non-alignment, and explained Jamaica's emerging foreign policy to Dr. Ralph Bunche, Golda Meir and Alexei Kosygin.

He assisted in the coordination of Ethiopian Emperor Haile Selassie's 1966 visit to Jamaica.

In 1967 to 1969 he served as Assistant Attorney General and Solicitor General in Jamaica. At a time when Jamaica was torn with controversy over Black Power and the development of the Rastafarian community, Rowe opined in favor of respect for human rights. In 1968 he was made a Queen's Counsel, the youngest Queen's Counsel in the Commonwealth at that time. In 1969 he was appointed a Judge of the Supreme Court of Jamaica.

Justice Rowe's decisions over a thirty-year period fundamentally anchored Jamaican and Commonwealth Jurisprudence in the Westminster model. His decision on R v Trevor Stone gave legitimacy to Gun Court judges sitting in criminal cases without a jury. His decisions in the Cayman Islands made money laundering more difficult. While sitting as President of the Court of Appeal of Belize, his decisions reinforced the rule of law and gave a strong advantage to defenders of the environment in that country. His fearless arraignment of a number of military officers for murder in the Green Bay killings incident reinforced the Separation of Powers and constitutional law in Jamaica.

His most significant contribution to Caribbean people was his crusade against the concept of illegitimacy in Family Law in the West Indies. The Family Law Committee of Jamaica, of which he was chairman, abolished Bastardy in Jamaica. Prior to the proposals of his Family Law Committee, individuals who were born out of wedlock in the Caribbean could not inherit in pari passu with their legitimate siblings.

Rowe was a champion of the Caribbean Court of Justice, which he did not live to serve on. He served as Chancellor of the Anglican Diocese of Jamaica for 20 years.

He died aged 75 on 25 January 2004 in the Turks & Caicos Islands. Queen Elizabeth II expressed condolences on his death through a statement issued by her Chief Clerk, Gill Middleburgh.

== Sources ==
- Ira Rowe, Caribbean Lawyer, garaibooks 2006.
- Trevor Stone v Queen 1980 17 JLR 37. Trevor Stone v Queen 1980 17 JLR 37.
- Jamaica Constitution Order in Council.
- Report of the Family Law Committee of Jamaica 1975.
- Leslie Frank Shaw v Belize Cemcol Ltd - Civil Appeal No. 30 of 2000.
- George Meerabux v The Attorney General - Court of Appeal, Belize, No. 3 of 2002.
- Caribbean Net News report of Ira Rowe's death.
- Birgit Irgit Wallraf and Michael Wallraf v John C. Roberson, Ruth E. Roberson, Gerald J. McDermott and Linda J. McDermott - Court of Appeal, Civil Appeal No. 8 of 2000.
- Press Release from the Cayman Islands Government Information Services regarding Ira Rowe's death.
- "The Jamaica Gleaner" report by Wyvolyn Gager regarding Ira Rowe's death.
- "The Jamaica Gleaner" report on Jamaica bids farewell to Appeal Judge.
- The Jamaican Senate approves the Family Property (Rights of Spouses) Act and approved the Bill.
- Notification for the launching of the book "Ira Rowe - Caribbean Lawyer."
- Attorney General of Jamaica v National Transport Co-operative Society Limited - Claim No. 2003/HCV0169.
- Norman Washington Manley
- Sir Alexander Bustamante
- Black Power
- Rastafarians
- Separation of Powers
- Westminster Model
- Status of Children Act, Jamaica.
- Status of Children Act, Jamaica.
- Status of Children Act - Ministry of Justice, Jamaica.
- Jamaica reports to treaty bodies concerning the Status of Children Act.
- Green Bay Killings.
