= Carol Lawrence-Beswick =

Jamaican jurist

Carol Lawrence-Beswick is a Jamaican jurist. She served as the senior puisne judge of the Supreme Court of Jamaica. She currently serves as the Chairperson of the Integrity Commission of Jamaica.

Born Carol Lawrence, Lawrence-Beswick is a 1973 graduate of Hollins University. In 1977 she completed an LLB at the University of the West Indies. For a time she served as Jamaica's assistant director of public prosecutors. In 2001 she was appointed to the Supreme Court of Jamaica; in 2014 she was one of five women to be appointed to the Court of Appeal. For her service she has received the Distinguished Alumnae Award from Hollins University. Lawrence-Beswick was married to senior attorney Paul Beswick until his passing in 2021. Together they have three daughters — Angel Beswick, who is a lawyer and writer, Paula-Kay Beswick, who is a classical violinist and Wendy Beswick, who is a lawyer as well.
