= Kenneth Smith (judge) =

Jamaican judge (1920-2009)

The Honourable Kenneth George Smith OJ

Chief Justice of Jamaica
- In office 1973–1984
- Preceded by: Sir Herbert Duffus
- Succeeded by: Sir Edward Zacca

Personal details
- Born: 25 July 1920 Clarendon, Colony of Jamaica, British Empire
- Died: 21 December 2009 (aged 89)
- Education: Lincoln's Inn (London)
- Awards: Order of Jamaica (1973)

Kenneth George Smith, OJ, was a Jamaican judge. He was Chief Justice of Jamaica from 1973 to 1984.

== Early life and education ==
Smith was born in Chapelton, Clarendon, Jamaica on 25 July 1920. He was the son of Franklin Clifford Smith, Civil Servant, and Clothilda Smith (née Campbell). Smith was educated at Cornwall College, Jamaica and at Lincoln's Inn (London).

== Legal career ==
Smith served as Assistant Clerk of the Courts in the Resident Magistrate's Department 1940-48. He was Deputy Clerk of Courts from 1948 to 1953, and Clerk of the Courts 1953-56. He then left Jamaica for England to pursue legal studies and qualified as a Barrister-at-Law at Lincoln's Inn before returning to Jamaica in 1956. On his return, he re-entered the Government Service as Acting Resident Magistrate for 6 months in 1956. Smith was appointed a Crown Counsel in the Attorney General's Chambers, where he served from 1956 to 1962. In 1962 he was promoted to the post of Assistant Attorney General, serving until 1965. In 1965, he was named a Puisne Judge of the Supreme Court, and in 1970 was elevated to a seat on the Court of Appeal until his appointment as Chief Justice in 1973. He served in that capacity until 1984. Smith was appointed as a Justice of Appeal of the Court of Appeal, Bahamas in 1983, serving in that post until his retirement in 1993.

== Personal life ==
Smith was married to Hyacinth Whitfield Connell on 4 July 1942. The couple had 2 daughters, Fay Olwen Smith and Hilma Enize Smith.

== Honors and awards ==
In 1973, Smith was awarded the Order of Jamaica (OJ), and is therefore styled The Honourable. He was a member of the Privy Council of Jamaica, which also confers the right to the prenominal style "The Honourable".

Government offices
Preceded by Sir Herbert Duffus	Chief Justice of Jamaica; 1973-1984	Succeeded by Sir Edward Zacca
