= Robert Furness =

Robert Furness may refer to:

- Sir Robert Allason Furness (1883–1954), professor of English at Cairo University
- Sir Robert Howard Furness (1880–1959), British judge in the Caribbean
