= Edward Webley =

Chief Justice of Jamaica

Edward Webley was Chief Justice of Jamaica in 1776.
