= Russell Sturgis (1805–1887) =

American merchant

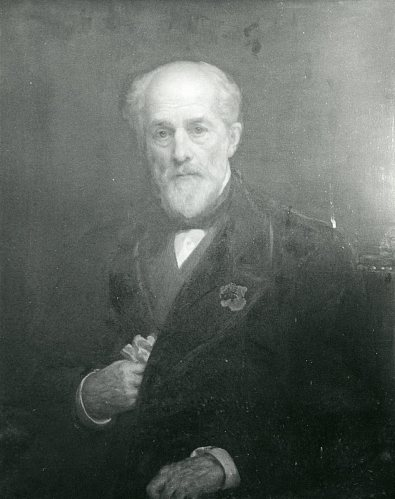
- Painted by Anna Lea Merritt
- Born: Nathaniel Russell Sturgis; July 7, 1805; Boston, Massachusetts, U.S.
- Died: November 2, 1887 (aged 82); Leatherhead, Surrey, England
- Education: Harvard College
- Spouses: Lucy Lyman Paine (m. 1828; died 1828) Mary Greene Hubbard (m. 1829; died 1837) Julia Overing Boit (m. 1846)
- Children: Russell Sturgis; Lucy Lyman Paine Sturgis; John Hubbard Sturgis; Mary Greene Sturgis; Henry Parkman Sturgis; Julian Sturgis; Mary Greene Hubbard Sturgis; Howard Overing Sturgis
- Parent(s): Nathaniel Russell Sturgis; Susannah Thomsen Parkman
- Relatives: Russell Sturgis (grandfather); Julian Codman (grandson); Richard Clipston Sturgis (grandson)

Russell Sturgis (July 7, 1805 – November 2, 1887) was a Boston merchant active in the China trade, and later head of Baring Brothers in London.

== Early life ==
Sturgis was born Nathaniel Russell Sturgis Jr., in Boston, Massachusetts, on July 7, 1805. He was a son of Nathaniel Russell Sturgis (1779–1856) and his wife, Susannah Thomsen (née Parkman) Sturgis. His younger brother was fellow merchant Henry Parkman Sturgis (father of author Maria Trinidad Howard Sturgis Middlemore), who served as United States Consul to the Philippines.

His paternal grandparents were the merchant Russell Sturgis (1750-1826) and Elizabeth (née Perkins) Sturgis (a sister of merchant Thomas Handasyd Perkins), both of Boston Brahmin families. Through his great-uncle Thomas Sturgis (the younger brother of his grandfather Russell), he was a second cousin of architect and art critic Russell Sturgis (1836-1909), who married Sarah Maria Barney, a daughter of Danford Newton Barney, a president of Wells Fargo & Company.

Sturgis entered Harvard College at the age of twelve and graduated in 1823 as a member of the Phi Beta Kappa society. He studied law at Northampton, Massachusetts.

== Career ==
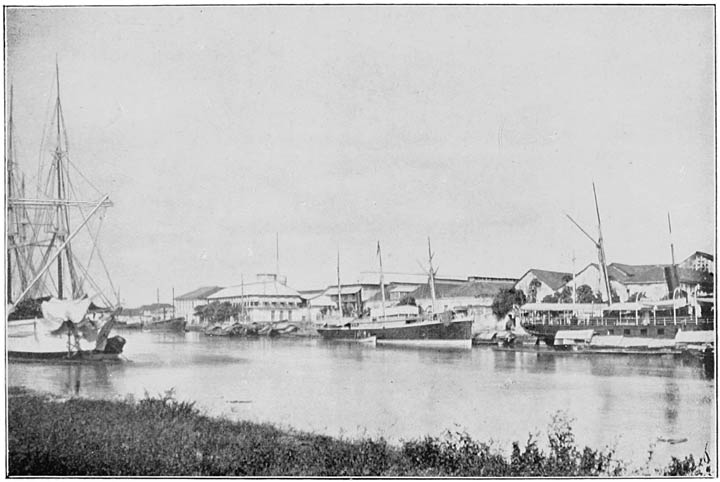
Russell and Sturgis's former office along the Pasig River in Manila, 1900.

In 1828, he changed his name legally to Russell Sturgis. That same year, after his second marriage, he made his first voyage abroad and then practiced law in Boston for a time. He sailed for Canton in 1833 on behalf of opium trader John Perkins Cushing, settling for some time in Macau where Lady Elizabeth Napier, wife of British emissary William John, 9th Lord Napier, found him "very intelligent". While he was there, his portrait and those of three of his four children by his second wife, Mary Greene Hubbard, were painted by the English portraitist George Chinnery. In Asia, he entered a succession of trading firms (Russell & Sturgis of Manila; Russell, Sturgis & Co. of Canton; Russell & Co.), and in 1842 he became a full partner.

In 1844, Sturgis retired to Boston to rejoin his children who had been sent there to school after their mother's 1837 death in Manila. He married for a third time, to Julia Overing Boit, and decided to return to China with his family in 1851. The steamer on which they crossed the Atlantic arrived too late to catch the onward ship from London. In their interval there, Sturgis was asked by the senior member of Barings Bank to become a partner. He accepted and ultimately became head of the firm, succeeding fellow American Joshua Bates (husband to Sturgis' cousin Lucretia). (Note: Joshua Bates's daughter, Elizabeth Anne Sturgis Bates (1817–1878), was married to Belgian Prime Minister Sylvain Van de Weyer. Their daughter, Victoria van de Weyer was married to Henry Brand, 2nd Viscount Hampden (a brother of Hon. Mary Cecilia Brand, who married Sturgis' son, Henry Parkman Sturgis, the MP for South Dorset).)

In England, he lived at 17 Carlton House Terrace in London (today home to the Federation of British Artists and the Mall Galleries), and Givons Grove in Leatherhead. Although he never renounced his U.S. citizenship, Sturgis did not return to the United States and died in England in 1887.

== Personal life ==
Sturgis married three times. He married his first wife, Lucy Lyman Paine (1805–1828), on April 3, 1828. Lucy was a daughter of Henry Paine and his wife Olive Lyman. Her paternal grandfather was Robert Treat Paine, a lawyer, politician, signer of the Declaration of Independence, and the first Attorney General of Massachusetts. Lucy died, aged 22, on August 20, 1828, just four months after their marriage.

On September 28, 1829, Sturgis married his second wife, Mary Greene Hubbard (1806–1837), a daughter of John Hubbard and his wife Jane Parkinson. She bore four children, the youngest of whom (Mary Greene Sturgis) died in infancy:. The other three, all of whom were members of the Codman family, were:

- Russell Sturgis Jr. (1831–1899), who married Susan Codman Welles (1832–1862), a daughter of Benjamin Welles and his wife Susan Codman. After his wife's death, this Sturgis married Margaret Cenos McCulloh (1835–1927), a daughter of Maryland Speaker James W. McCulloh, who was the center of the landmark Supreme Court case McCulloch v. Maryland, 17 U.S. 316 (1819), and his wife, Abigail Sears.
- Lucy Lyman Paine Sturgis (1833–1907), who married Col. Charles Russell Codman (1829–1918)
- John Hubbard Sturgis (1834–1888), an architect who married Frances Anne Codman (a half-sister to Lucy's husband Charles).

After the death of his wife Mary, Sturgis married, for a third time, to Julia Overing Boit (1823–1888) on June 4, 1846. She was the daughter of John Boit Jr., one of the first Americans involved in the maritime fur trade. and his wife Eleanor Auchmuty Jones. With Julia, Sturgis had four more children:

- Henry Parkman Sturgis (1847–1929), who served as a Member of Parliament for South Dorset and High Sheriff of the County of London. He married the Hon. Mary Cecilia Brand, daughter of Speaker Henry Brand, 1st Viscount Hampden, in 1872. After her death in 1886, he married Marie "Mariette" Eveleen Meredith, a daughter of the novelist George Meredith, in 1896.
- Julian Russell Sturgis (1848–1904), a novelist, poet, librettist and lyricist who married Mary Maud de la Poer Beresford, a daughter of Colonel Marcus de La Poer Beresford, in 1883.
- Mary Greene Hubbard Sturgis (1851–1942), who married Lt.-Col. Leopold Richard Seymour (1841–1904), son of British diplomat Sir Hamilton Seymour and a grandson of Lord George Seymour and Henry Trevor, 21st Baron Dacre. After his death, she married Bertram Falle, 1st Baron Portsea in 1906.
- Howard Overing Sturgis (1855–1920), a novelist and close friend of Henry James and Edith Wharton. After the death of his mother in 1888 he moved with his lover, William Haynes-Smith, into a country house named Queen's Acre, near Windsor Great Park.

Sturgis died at his country seat in Leatherhead, Surrey on November 2, 1887. His widow also died there, less than a year later, on May 31, 1888.

=== Descendants ===
Through his daughter Lucy, he was a grandfather of Anne McMasters Codman (1864–1944) (who married Henry Bromfield Cabot), and lawyer Julian Codman (1870–1932), who was a vigorous opponent of Prohibition and was involved with the Anti-Imperialist League. Julian married Nora Chadwick, a daughter of Dr. James Read Chadwick.

Through his eldest son, Russell, Sturgis was a grandfather of architect Richard Clipston Sturgis (1860–1951) who was successor to his uncle's practice. He married Esther Mary Ogden and was the father of Richard Clipston Sturgis Jr., also an architect.
