= Thomas Fearon =

Former Chief Justice of Jamaica

Thomas Fearon was Chief Justice of Jamaica from 1756 to 1764.
