= Edward Pennant =

Former Chief Justice of Jamaica

Edward Pennant (died 1736) was Chief Justice of Jamaica.
