= Howard Sturgis =

British novelist

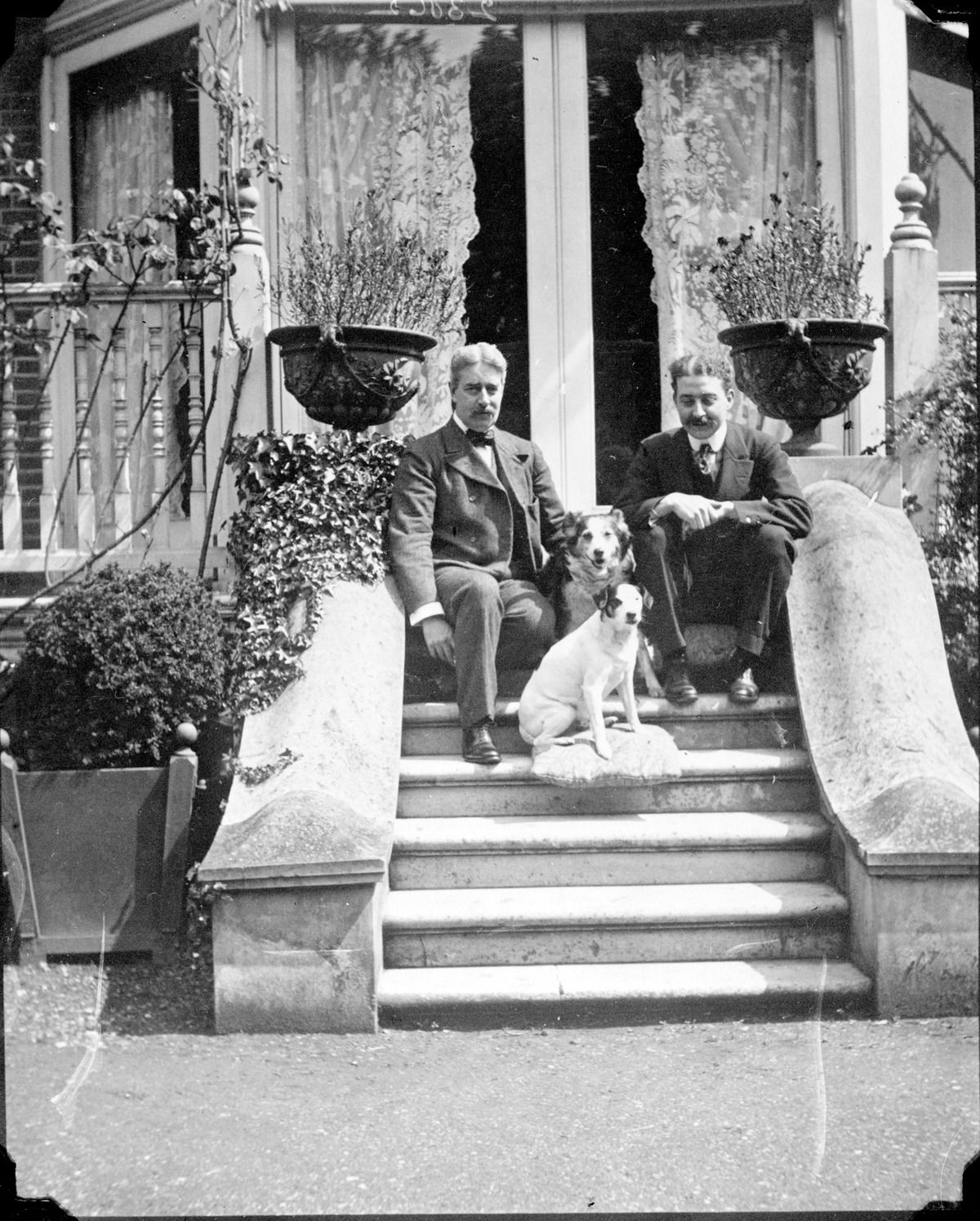
- Sturgis and William Haynes Smith with two dogs at Queen's Acres, Windsor, before 1920
- Born: Howard Overing Sturgis; January 30, 1855; London, England
- Died: February 7, 1920 (aged 65); Windsor, Berkshire, England
- Education: Eton College; Trinity College, Cambridge
- Partner: William Haynes-Smith
- Writing career
- Notable works: Tim: A Story of School Life, All that was possible, Belchamber

Howard Overing Sturgis (January 30, 1855 – February 7, 1920) was an English-language novelist who wrote about same-sex love. Of American parentage, he lived and worked in Britain.

== Early life ==
"Howdie," as he was known to his intimates, was born in London on 30 January 1855 into an affluent New England American family. His father, Russell Sturgis, was a China trader and lawyer who later became head of Barings Bank in London. His mother was Russell's third wife, Julia Overing (née Boit) Sturgis. Among his siblings were brothers Julian (who also became a novelist) and Henry (who became MP for South Dorset) and sister Mary (wife of Bertram Falle, 1st Baron Portsea). From his father's earlier marriage, he had an elder half-brother, John Hubbard Sturgis, who was a noted Boston architect.

He was described as "a delicate child, closely attached to his mother, and fond of such girlish hobbies as needlepoint and knitting, which he continued to practice throughout his life." His parents sent him to be educated at Eton College. He went on to study at Trinity College, Cambridge, where he graduated with a BA degree in 1878. He became a friend of the novelists Henry James and Edith Wharton.

== Career ==
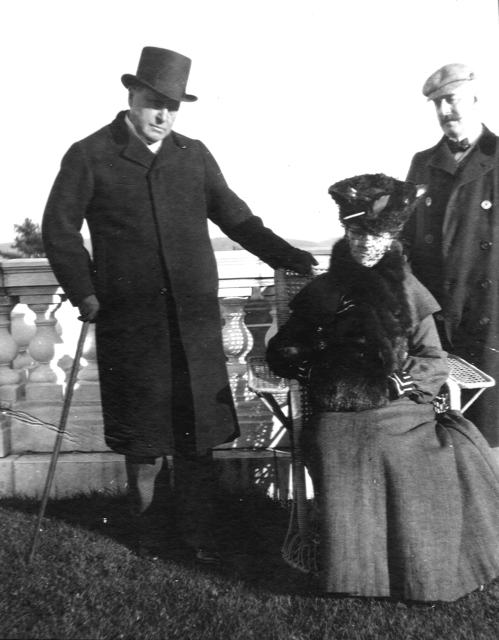
Henry James, Edith Wharton and Howard Sturgis on the veranda at The Mount.

Sturgis's first novel, Tim: A Story of School Life (1891), was published anonymously and was dedicated to the "love that surpasses the love of women." It describes the love of two youths at boarding-school and was "based on his unhappy days at Eton." It was followed in 1895 by All that was possible, an epistolary novel about an actress who retires from London to a remote valley in Wales.

Sturgis' first two novels were successful as far as sales were concerned; but his third, Belchamber (1904), failed to gain the same plaudits. Although Edith Wharton praised it, Henry James found it unsatisfactory, and let Sturgis know in several letters. Afterwards Sturgis went on to publish only one short story (1908), about a lesser writer driven suicidal by the criticism of a greater, and a memorial on his friend, Anne Thackeray.

== Personal life ==
After the death of his mother in 1888, he bought a country house named Queen's Acre ("Qu’acre"), near Windsor Great Park and moved there with his lover, William Haynes-Smith (1871–1937), known to all as "the Babe." Haynes-Smith was the son of the English colonial administrator Sir William Haynes-Smith. At Qu’acre, they frequently entertained a wide group of friends, including Wharton and James.

Sturgis died at Windsor, Berkshire on 7 February 1920. Four years after his death, Haynes-Smith married Howard's niece, Alice Maud Russell Sturgis (a daughter of his elder half-brother John Hubbard Sturgis), at Manchester-by-the-Sea, Massachusetts. Both were in their 50s when they married.

=== Legacy ===
After his death appreciations of him were published by A. C. Benson (1924), Edith Wharton (1934), E. M. Forster (1936) and George Santayana (1944), his cousin. His great-nephew is the journalist and novelist Henry Porter.

== Works ==
- Tim: A Story of School Life (1891) [Anonymously published]
- All That Was Possible (1895)
- Belchamber (1904)
- 'On the Pottlecombe Cornice', in Fortnightly Review (1908) [short story]
