= Robert Noell =

Chief Justice of Jamaica

Robert Noell was Chief Justice of Jamaica in 1688.
