= St. Jago High School =

School in Spanish Town, Jamaica

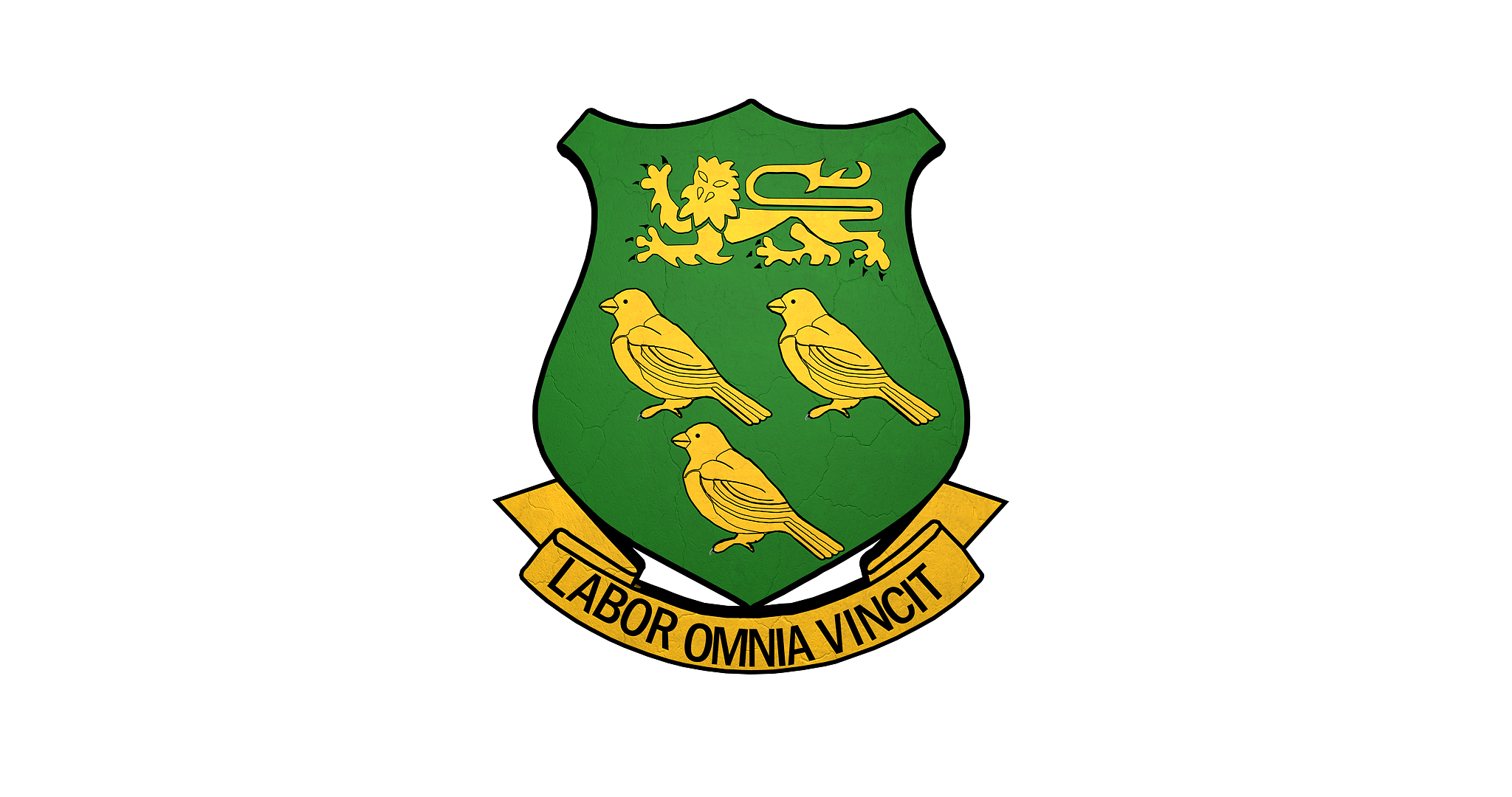
- St Jago High School Crest

Location
- 33 Monk Street; Ravensworth; Spanish Town, St Catherine; Jamaica; 17.9998306°N 76.9513053°W

Information
- Type: Public school (government funded)
- Motto: Labor Omnia Vincit (Work Conquers All, Labor Conquers All)
- Religious affiliation: Anglican
- Established: 1744; 282 years ago
- Founder: Peter Beckford (bequest)
- Chairperson: Lissa Grant
- Principal: Collette Feurtado-Pryce
- Chaplain: Katherine Williamson-Teape
- Staff: 120+
- Faculty: 100+
- Gender: Co-educational
- Age range: 11-20
- Enrollment: 1800+
- Language: English, Spanish and French
- Hours in school day: Curricular: 8:20 to 3:00; Extra-Curricular: 3:00 to 4:00
- Classrooms: 36
- Houses: Beckford, Campbell, Bell, Wortley, Smith, Nuttall
- Colours: Green and gold
- Song: Born in the Shades of Ancient Santiago
- Sports: Track and Field, Football, Volleyball, Badminton, Table Tennis, Netball, Basketball, Chess, Cricket
- Mascot: Lion
- Nickname: Jago, Ravens, Ravensworth
- Yearbook: Ravensworth Review
- Website: www.stjago.edu.jm

St. Jago High School (formerly Beckford & Smith) in Spanish Town, St Catherine, Jamaica, founded in 1744, is one of the oldest, continuously operating schools in the Western Hemisphere. It is renowned for graduating some of Jamaica's senior military officers, world class cricketers, academic scholars, performing artists, and Olympic athletes.

The Principal at St Jago High School is currently Collette Feurtado-Pryce, who was appointed to the position in January 2016.

== History ==
St Jago was founded in 1744 under the will of Peter Beckford (junior), one of the wealthiest planters in the Colony of Jamaica. When he died in 1735, he had amassed a huge personal fortune, including the ownership of 1,737 slaves.

St Jago was the third oldest school in Jamaica, after Wolmer's Boys', one of the Wolmer's Schools (1729) and Manning's School (1738). In the 18th century, these schools originated from their benefactors’ concerns for the education of the country's poor, usually the children of poor whites, as there was no system in place for the education of the children of slaves. It began as the Free School of St. Jago-de-la-Vega and later amalgamated two schools, Beckford and Smith (a boys' school) and Cathedral Girls High.

Beckford, in his will dated 1730, bequeathed the sum of 1,000 pounds sterling towards the construction of a free school or hospital. The institution was intended to benefit the poor people of the town of St. Jago de la Vega, later renamed Spanish Town. Several other smaller endowments were made, resulting in the establishment of the St. Jago de la Vega Free School in 1744. A century later, Francis Smith, then Custos Rotulorum of St. Catherine, bequeathed 300 pounds sterling in his will dated 1830, for the founding of a school in the parish. Called the Smith's Charity School after its benefactor, it was opened in 1833.

In 1876, this school was to merge with St Jago de la Vega Free School to form Beckford and Smith's Boys School. In 1956, the final merger to form the present day St. Jago High School took place. At that time, Cathedral High School for Girls was amalgamated with Beckford and Smith's Boys School and a new building housing the new St Jago High School was declared open in 1958 by then governor of Jamaica, Sir Kenneth Blackburne. This property is commonly known as Ravensworth.

== School crest ==
The school's crest is the term typically applied to the standard or coat of arms of the school. The crest shall be a shield in emerald green (heraldic vert) surmounting an up-arching banner. The banner is of gold (or) and bears the original Latin motto of the school in black (sable) upper case letters. The banner shall be neither cut nor clipped. The edges shall be straight. It shall be folded under once at each end. On the escutcheon shall be charged one heraldic lion or above three birds or, each of a different kind. The two shall be side by side beneath the feet of the lion. Beneath them shall be the final, which stands on the lowest point of the shield. The birds shall all look left while the lion passant guardant. (i.e. facing the viewer, the right paw of the lion shall extend and point to the left.)

== Athletic houses ==
The school has six houses which compete for athletic honours:

- Beckford (Red)
- Bell (Green)
- Campbell (Orange)
- Nuttall (Purple)
- Smith (Blue)
- Wortley (Yellow)

== Notable alumni ==
=== Leaders ===
- Norman Manley, ONH, National Hero
- Michael Henry, Member of Jamaican Parliament
- Carl Rattray, Member of Jamaican Parliament
- Lensley Wolfe, Chief Justice

=== Musicians ===
- Christopher Martin

=== Footballer ===
- Khadija Shaw, Forward, Jamaica Women's National Team

=== Olympians ===
- Melaine Walker, Olympic Gold medallist
- Michelle Freeman, Olympic medallist sprint hurdler
- Juliet Campbell, Olympic medallist sprinter
- Gregory Meghoo, Olympic silver medallist sprinter
- Bertland Cameron, 400m world champion
- Kerron Stewart, Olympic Silver medallist
- Peta-Gaye Dowdie
- Yohan Blake, Olympic Gold medallist
- Markino Buckley, 2008 Olympian 800m
- Nickel Ashmeade, Olympic Gold medallist
- Nathon Allen, Olympic Silver medalist
