= Belchamber =

1904 novel by Howard Sturgis

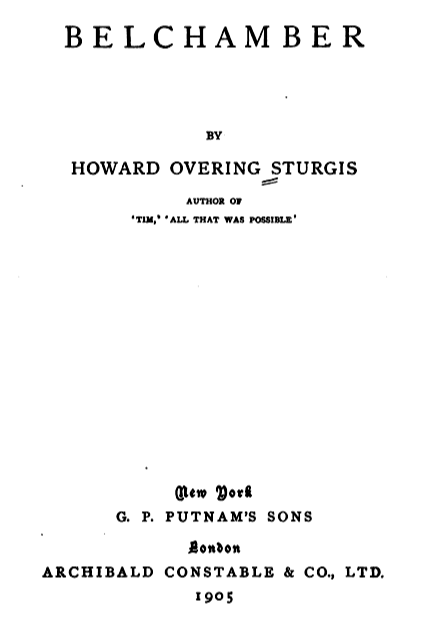
- Title page
- Author: Howard Sturgis
- Language: English
- Genre: Novel
- Publication date: 1904
- Publication place: United Kingdom
- Media type: Print (hardback)

Belchamber is a 1904 novel by Howard Sturgis.

== Plot ==
The story follows the life of Sainty, Marquis of Belchamber, from childhood to his mid-twenties. Sainty is shy, physically weak, likes knitting and dislikes sports. After much goading from his mother (Lady Charmington), he marries Cissy. However, she turns out to find him repugnant, and the marriage is unconsummated. Cissy later gives birth to a son, who Sainty realises is the result of an affair with his cousin Claude. Despite this, Sainty feels great love for the baby and is devastated when it falls ill and dies. As they grieve, Sainty and Cissy learn that an uncaring Claude has become engaged to someone else.

== Literary significance and criticism ==
The novel received mainly poor reviews from readers and critics, although E. M. Forster deplored the lack of readership the book received. Edith Wharton, a personal friend of Sturgis', nonetheless praised the novel. She described it as "very nearly in the first rank", and tried in vain to have the novel published by Scribner's before it was picked up by Putnam.
