= F. W. Forbes Ross =

British surgeon and medical writer

Frederick William Forbes Ross
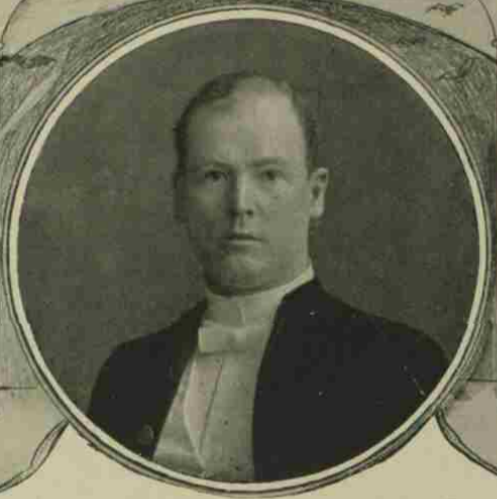
- Born: December 1867; Jamaica
- Died: 18 September 1913 (aged 45); London
- Occupations: Surgeon, inventor

Frederick William Forbes Ross (December 1867 – 18 September 1913) F.R.C.S. was a British surgeon and inventor. Ross was an alternative cancer treatment advocate who promoted the theory that cancer is caused by a deficiency of potassium salts in the body and that if the deficiency is remedied, cancer will retrograde. He also commended the use of raw meat as a treatment for tuberculosis.

== Biography ==
Ross was born in Jamaica. He was the eldest son of Sir David Palmer Ross, Surgeon General of British Guiana. He studied at Edinburgh University and Royal College of Surgeons of Edinburgh. He graduated M.D. in 1893, his thesis was on the bacteriology of infantile diarrhoea and its treatment. In 1898, he obtained the D.P.H. of the London Conjoint Board and took its conjoint diploma in 1903. He became a Fellow of the Royal College of Surgeons of England in 1903. He was Civil Surgeon to the Guards' Hospital, London, and Clinical Assistant at the Samaritan Hospital. He was Surgeon to the Kensington General Hospital.

Ross invented several surgical instruments and apparatus such as a pilot catheter for removing blood-clot from the bladder and an inhaler for the continuous administration of oxygen. Ross advocated a new local anaesthetic made from a sterilized solution of quinine and urea hydrochloride which prevented pain after an operation.

In November 1912, Ross attended dozens of influenza patients but contracted the illness while visiting them. Ross died in a West End nursing home after an operation, in 1913.

== Cancer research ==
Ross authored Cancer: The Problem of its Genesis and Treatment, in 1912. In the book he argued that cancer is caused by a deficiency of potassium salts. He noted that many people's diets are deficient in potassium because they boil their foods. Ross recommended that vegetables should be baked or steamed, not boiled. He opposed the consumption of alcoholic spirits, refined sugar and white bread because they are low in potassium.

Ross stated that by utilizing large quantities of potassium in his own practice for many years, not one case of cancer had developed among his patients. Ross had cancer patients sent to him from other medical men. He prescribed a daily amount of potassium citrate and phosphate with a weekly dose of five grains of potassium iodide to his cancer patients and reported successful results.

His book received mixed reviews in medical journals. A review in The Lancet concluded that "the cases are too recent and too few in number to enable any definite opinion to be formed as to the value of the treatment, but we believe the author to be thoroughly convinced of the truth of his theory." A negative review in the American Journal of the Medical Sciences commented that "his few experiments are insufficient and his deductions are poorly founded. The book is quite unconvincing to the scientific reader." In contrast, a positive review in the International Journal of Medicine and Surgery stated that "the book is written interestingly and deserves the careful perusal of all who are interested in the subject of cancer."

In 1924, Walter Sydney Lazarus-Barlow chief of the Cancer Research Department at Middlesex Hospital disputed Ross's potassium treatment for cancer. Lazarus-Barlow commented that "experiments were conducted here with a view to determining the amount of potassium in the blood and tissue of normal persons and cancer patients and we found that there was more in the latter."

Ross's ideas about cancer are largely forgotten today but have been cited in alternative medicine literature.

== Meat diet ==
Ross held unorthodox opinions about raw meat which were widely reported in newspapers but criticized by the medical community. He stated that frozen mutton has never poisoned anyone. Ross advocated the feeding of tuberculosis patients with raw or partially cooked meat from tuberculosis cattle. He wrote a paper on the subject for the New York Medical Journal, in 1907. Ross stated that he was a "habitual eater of quantities of very underdone sirloin of beef steak, and I do so because I believe as a result of investigations it protects me against all forms of tuberculous infection." According to Ross, the meat of tuberculosis cattle is not injurious and should be consumed for the purpose of combatting the disease. Ross argued that butchers are least affected by tuberculosis.

By using meat known definitely to be tuberculous we can regulate the dose of toxin and anti-toxin by mouth, and also regulate the amount of reaction and rise and fall of opsonic index. Tuberculous meat should be an article of food and cure in all sanatoria.

— Dr. F. W. Forbes Ross in 1907

Ross stated that humans as hunters are essentially meat-eaters and recommended a regulated meat diet for old persons which he claimed could add from seven to twelve years to their life by eating meat daily.

== Selected publications ==
- Intestinal Intoxication in Infants, with Outlines of Infant Feeding (1897)
- Meat Albumin Dietary In The Treatment Of Tuberculosis (1901)
- Tuberculotherapy in Tuberculosis (1907)
- Cancer: The Problem of its Genesis and Treatment (1912)
