= John Walters (judge) =

Chief Justice of Jamaica

John Walters was Chief Justice of Jamaica in 1706.
