= Peter Bernard =

Chief Justice of Jamaica

Peter Bernard was Chief Justice of Jamaica in 1716.
