= William Mitchell (judge) =

Chief Justice of Jamaica

William Mitchell was Chief Justice of Jamaica in 1663.
