= Gun law in Jamaica =

Jamaican law allows firearm ownership on may-issue basis. With approximately eight civilian firearms per 100 people, Jamaica is the 92nd most armed country in the world.

Gun laws in Jamaica began to be tightened in the early 1970s, when Jamaica experienced a rise in violence associated with criminal gangs and political polarization between supporters of the People's National Party and the Jamaica Labour Party.

== History ==
Before 1962, Jamaica's murder rate was one of the world's lowest with 3.9 per 100,000 population (4.6 in the US).

After a rash of killings of lawyers and businessmen in 1974, the government of Michael Manley attempted to restore order by granting broad new law enforcement powers in the Suppression of Crime Act and the Gun Court Act. This allowed the police and the military to work together in a novel way to disarm the people: soldiers could seal off entire neighborhoods and police could systematically search the houses for weapons without a warrant. The goal was to expedite and improve enforcement of the 1967 Firearms Act, which imposed licensing requirements on ownership and possession of guns and ammunition, and prohibited automatic weapons entirely.

With the new law, owning a bullet could lead to a life sentence. A special gun court held secret trials. A major national crackdown was orchestrated to dismantle newly outlawed gun-related networks. A censorship policy was applied for national medias to apply. Within the first six months, the crime rates dropped, but then it got back up and kept increasing.

Prime Minister Michael Manley expressed his determination to take stronger action against firearms, predicting that "It will be a long war. No country can win a war against crime overnight, but we shall win. By the time we have finished with them, Jamaican gunmen will be sorry they ever heard of a thing called a gun." In order to win this war, Manley believed it necessary to disarm the whole public: "There is no place in this society for the gun, now or ever."

All through the 1990s, Jamaica's murder rate was among the world's highest, and peaked in 2009. Guns are involved in 80% of those crimes. In 2012, Jamaica's murder rate reached 45.1 per 100,000. In 2010, a days-long gun battle sparked in the streets of Kingston (Tivoli Gardens), opposing the police force against the supporters of US-convict Christopher Coke.

In September 2015, the government launched the "Get the guns" campaign (similar to a gun buyback program): 130 illegal weapons and 1,500 rounds of ammo were collected in two months. All through 2015, 584 illegal firearms were collected by the police. A majority originated from the United States. Obama's decision to apply stricter gun laws was seen as a positive decision to reduce the Jamaican black market of firearms. Guns also come into Jamaica from Haiti. In January 2018, after a wave of killing in Montego Bay (335 murders in 2017), the authorities declared a state of emergency in this part of the island. Amnesty International had previously criticized the Jamaican authorities for orchestrating large unlawful killings. In March 2018, the government declared the upcoming amendment of the Firearms Act to discourage the possession of and/or dealing in illegal firearms and ammunition.

== Description ==
=== Firearms Act ===
The Firearms Act regulates the ownership and use of firearms and ammunition. It was first passed in 1967, and has been subsequently amended.

The Firearms Act prohibits ownership of any artillery, automatic firearm, grenade, bomb or other like missile. Law states that the applicants must have good reason to apply for firearm license without defining what constitutes a good reason, leaving it at the discretion of authority.

Firearm licences in Jamaica require a background check, inspection and payment of a yearly fee, and can make legal gun ownership difficult for ordinary citizens. The new judicial procedures of the Gun Court Act were designed to ensure that firearms violations would be tried quickly and harshly punished.

Firearm owners who do not wish to travel with their firearms are not allowed to leave them at home. They are obligated by law to deposit them at the local police station for safekeeping. Some airports also have a gun safe-keeping service. Storage costs $300/month ($500 for shotguns). Those found in violation of this law risk a maximum fine of $200,000 and a maximum sentence of 12 months in jail.

=== Gun Court ===
The Gun Court was established by Parliament in 1974 to combat rising gun violence, and empowered to try suspects in camera, without a jury. The Supreme Court, Circuit Courts, and Resident Magistrate's Courts function as Gun Courts whenever they hear firearms cases. There is also a Western Regional Gun Court in Montego Bay. Those convicted by the Gun Court are imprisoned for life in a dedicated prison compound at South Camp in Kingston. Until 1999, the Gun Court sessions were also held in the same facility.

According to David Kopel, the courts also function without the need for hard evidence, for all practical purposes. The testimony of any police officer is always sufficient to secure a conviction. Corroborating physical evidence is never required. For many years the only sentence issued by Gun Courts was indefinite incarceration. Pressure from Amnesty International caused authorities to amend the sentences (post conviction) to life in prison without parole. Anyone convicted in any Gun Court for any offense is removed from Jamaican society permanently.

== Criticism ==
Dean Weingarten (Army Research, Development, Testing, and Evaluation) argued that gun violence kept rising since the government passed draconian laws on gun control. John R. Lott Jr. (Crime Prevention Research Center) made the same observation.

== See also ==
- Overview of gun laws by nation
- Crime in Jamaica
- Green Bay Massacre
