= Henry Parkman Sturgis =

American-born banker & politician (1847-1929)

High Sheriff of the County of London
- In office 1896–1897
- Preceded by: George Faudel-Phillips
- Succeeded by: Henry James Lubbock

Member of Parliament for South Dorset
- In office 1885–1886
- Preceded by: New constituency
- Succeeded by: Charles J. T. Hambro

Personal details
- Born: 1 March 1847 United States
- Died: 1 March 1929 (aged 82)
- Spouses: Hon. Mary Cecilia Brand (m. 1872; died 1886) Marie "Mariette" Eveleen Meredith (m. 1896)
- Relations: John Hubbard Sturgis (brother); Julian Sturgis (brother); Howard Sturgis (brother); Maria Trinidad Howard Sturgis Middlemore (cousin)
- Parents: Russell Sturgis; Julia Boit Sturgis
- Education: Eton College
- Alma mater: Christ Church, Oxford

Henry Parkman Sturgis (1 March 1847 – 1 March 1929) was an American-born banker in England and a Liberal politician.

== Early life ==
Sturgis was born in the United States on 1 March 1847. He was a son of Russell Sturgis and his third wife, Julia Overing Boit, a daughter of Eleanor Auchmuty (née Jones) Boit and John Boit Jr., one of the first Americans involved in the maritime fur trade. Among his siblings were the authors Julian Sturgis and Howard Sturgis and Mary Greene Hubbard Sturgis (wife of Bertram Falle, 1st Baron Portsea). From his father's previous marriage to Mary Greene Hubbard, his elder half-brother was prominent architect and builder John Hubbard Sturgis.

Sturgis was named after his uncle, Henry Parkman Sturgis (1806–1869), who with his brother Russell Sturgis (1805–1887) made a fortune from the Manila-based mercantile house Russell & Sturgis founded with George Robert Russell. His cousin Maria Trinidad Howard Sturgis Middlemore was an author.

== Education and career ==
Sturgis was educated at Eton and at Christ Church, Oxford. He became a partner in Baring Bros. & Co. of Liverpool (his father was senior partner in London) and was a director of London and Westminster Bank.

In the 1885 general election, Sturgis was elected Member of Parliament for South Dorset but lost the seat in the 1886 general election. He was High Sheriff of the County of London in 1896.

== Personal life ==
On 2 October 1872, Sturgis was married to the Hon. Mary Cecilia Brand (1851–1886) at Parish Church in Glynde. Mary was a daughter of Henry Brand, 1st Viscount Hampden (son of Henry Trevor, 21st Baron Dacre) and the former Eliza Ellice (daughter of General Robert Ellice). Before her death on 20 June 1886, they were the parents of six children, including:

- Margery Sturgis (b. 1874)
- Rachel Sturgis (b. 1876)
- Olive Sturgis (b. 1878)
- Lt.-Col. Henry Russell Sturgis (1879–1967), who married Violet Elizabeth Grinnell-Milne, a sister of Duncan Grinnell-Milne, in 1913.
- Mary Sturgis (1886–1982), who married William Fortescue Basset, a son of Richard Bassett, in 1910.

On 17 July 1896, Sturgis married Marie "Mariette" Eveleen Meredith (1871–1933), the daughter of the novelist George Meredith.

Sturgis died on 1 March 1929.

Parliament of the United Kingdom
New constituency	Member of Parliament for South Dorset; 1885 – 1886	Succeeded by Charles J. T. Hambro
Honorary titles
Preceded by George Faudel-Phillips	High Sheriff of the County of London; 1896 – 1897	Succeeded by Henry James Lubbock
