= John Augustus Sullivan =

Jamaican politician

John Augustus Sullivan (19 August 1798 – 23 June 1871) was Secretary for Demerara, and Provost Marshal General of Jamaica.

== Early life ==
Sullivan was born in England on 19 August 1798. He was the son of John Sullivan (1749–1839) of Richings Park, Buckinghamshire, and Lady Henrietta Anne Barbara Hobart (c. 1762–1828). Among his siblings was sister, Harriet Margaret Sullivan, who married Vice-Adm. Sir George Tyler. His father was MP for Old Sarum, Ashburton, and Aldborough and served as Under-Secretary of State for War and the Colonies before he was appointed Privy Counsellor in 1805.

His paternal grandparents were Benjamin Sullivan of Dromeragh, County Cork, and Bridget Limric. Among his paternal family were uncles, Sir Benjamin Sullivan, a Judge in Madras, India (who married Eliza Dent, a daughter of Adm Sir Digby Dent), and Sir Richard Sullivan, 1st Baronet, MP for New Romney. His maternal grandparents were George Hobart, 3rd Earl of Buckinghamshire and Albinia Bertie (a daughter of Lord Vere Bertie).

== Career ==
He served as Secretary and Registrar for Demerara (Note: Demerara was formerly a Colony of the Dutch West India Company between 1745 and 1792, then a colony of the Dutch state from 1792 until 1815. After the British took control, it merged with Essequibo in 1812 and before formally became a British colony in 1815. In 1831, Demerara-Essequibo merged with Berbice to form the colony of British Guiana in 1831, which became the County of British Guiana in 1838.), and Provost Marshal General of Jamaica from 1825 until his death in 1871.

He owned Highgate House in Jamaica.

== Personal life ==
Sullivan was twice married. On 17 August 1826, Sullivan married, as his second wife, Jane Tyler (d. 1847), daughter of Adm. Sir Charles Tyler and Margaret Leach. Jane's brother, Sir George Tyler, had previously married John's sister, Harriet. Before her death at Leamington in 1847, they were the parents of two sons and a daughter:

- Roper Augustus Sullivan (1827–1886), a soldier with the Royal Buckinghamshire Militia; he married Mary Frances Theresa McDonnell, a daughter of Francis McDonnell Esq. of Plas Newydd, Usk, Monmouthshire, in 1857.
- Emilia Caroline Sullivan (1832–1918), who married Lewis Knight Bruce of Manor House, St Nicholas, Glamorgan, son of John Bruce Bruce-Pryce and Sarah Austin, in 1856. Among her siblings were brothers Henry Bruce, 1st Baron Aberdare and Gen. Robert Bruce.
- Frederick Sullivan (1835–1892), the Postmaster General of Jamaica from 1870 to 1891; he married Caroline Kemble, second daughter of William Kemble, Esq. of Eastbourne, his predecessor as Postmaster General, in 1862.

Sullivan died on 23 June 1871.

=== Descendants ===
Through his eldest son Roper, he was a grandfather of Mary Louisa Sullivan (d. 1938), who married her cousin, Lewis Hobart Knight Bruce, in 1885 and, after his death in 1889, Francis Joseph Denys McDonnell in 1895.

Through his daughter Emilia, he was a grandfather of three grandsons and four granddaughters, including Lewis Hobart Knight Bruce (1860–1885), who married his cousin Mary Louisa Sullivan; Francis Villiers Knight Bruce (b. 1864), who married Laetitia Eugenie Wood; and Sir Gerald Trevor Knight Bruce (1871–1953), who married Lilian Isabel Booke in 1896 (and parents of Maj.‑Gen. John Geoffrey Knight‑Bruce, who married Marjory Isabel Coney, and Marian Dorothy Henriatte Knight‑Bruce, who married Col. Sir Geoffrey Byass, 2nd Baronet).

Through his second son Frederic, he was a grandfather of two grandsons and four granddaughters, including Charles Frederic Sullivan (b. 1862); Hugh Sullivan (b. 1874); and Kathleen Mary Sullivan (wife of Leonard Sutton and mother of Leonard Cecil Leicester Sutton).
