= Richard Mill =

Former Chief Justice of Jamaica

Richard Mill was Chief Justice of Jamaica in 1733.
