= Firearms Act (Jamaica) =

Jamaican gun control legislation

The Firearms Act of Jamaica is a law that regulates the ownership and use of firearms and ammunition. It was first passed in 1967, and has been subsequently amended. The law requires gun licenses, with a yearly registration fee of JM$12,000.00 (US$ 79.19). There were about 65,000 licensed firearms in Jamaica in 2002, and approximately seven hundred licenses approved per year. All crimes involving firearms are tried by a special Gun Court established in 1975.

== See also ==
- Gun politics in Jamaica
