= Thomas Witter Jackson =

Chief Justice of Jamaica

Thomas Witter Jackson was Chief Justice of Jamaica from 1818 to 1821.
