= Philip Ward (judge) =

Chief Justice of Jamaica

Philip Ward was Chief Justice of Jamaica in 1661.
