= Adam Gibb Ellis =

Chief Justice of Jamaica

Sir Adam Gibb Ellis (died 16 August 1894) was Chief Justice of Jamaica from 1884 to 1894.

Ellis died in Kingston on 16 August 1894.
