= Bryan Edwards (judge) =

Jamaican Chief Justice (??–??)

Sir Bryan Edwards was the Chief Justice of Jamaica in 1855.
