= Alfred Lucie-Smith =

British colonial judge

Sir Alfred van Waterschoodt Lucie-Smith (9 January 1854 – 3 June 1947) was a British colonial judge.

Lucie-Smith was born in Demerara, British Guiana, the second son of Sir John Lucie-Smith, later the Chief Justice of Jamaica, and his wife Marie, eldest daughter of J. R. van Waterschoodt. He was educated at Rugby School and from 1877 worked as a solicitor in British Guiana.

In 1878 he entered the Middle Temple, where he was called to the bar in 1881, and a year later became acting Solicitor General of British Guiana. He was sent to Cyprus in 1887 where he served as president of a district court in Famagusta. After five years, he was transferred to another court in Limassol. Lucie-Smith was nominated an Acting Queen's Advocate in 1893 and was attached to Constantinople in 1895 as an Acting Consular Judge. Only a year later he came to Kingston, Jamaica, where he acted as the parish's resident magistrate.

In 1898, Lucie-Smith returned to British Guiana, having been made a Puisne Judge. He stayed in this office until 1908, when he was appointed Chief Justice of Trinidad and Tobago. He was created a Knight Bachelor in 1911 and retired as judge in 1924.

On 15 August 1885, he had married Rose Alice, seventh daughter of Edward Leopold Aves at the church Nuestra Señora del Monte in Demarara. After her death, he remarried 4 September 1901, in Kensington, Mary Meta Ruth Palmer Ross, daughter of Sir David Palmer Ross, at some time Surgeon-General of British Guiana. Lucie-Smith was father of eight sons and a daughter. His son John served also as a judge and was Chief Justice of Sierra Leone.

His nephew Euan Lucie-Smith was one of the first mixed-heritage infantry officers in a regular British Army regiment, and the first killed in World War I.

== Notes ==
Legal offices
Preceded by Sir Ernest Alfred Northcote	Chief Justice of Trinidad and Tobago; 1908–1924	Succeeded by Sir Stanley Fisher
