= M. H. Sturgis =

American-Filipina author

- Born: Maria Trinidad Howard Sturgis; July 26, 1846; Manila, Philippines
- Died: February 11, 1890 (aged 43); Malvern, England
- Occupation: Writer
- Spouse: Samuel George Chetwynd Middlemore (m. 1881-1890; his death)
- Relatives: Henry Parkman Sturgis (cousin)
- Writing career
- Pen name: S. C. G. Middlemore; M. H. Sturgis

Maria Trinidad Howard Sturgis Middlemore (also wrote as Mrs. S. C. G. Middlemore and M. H. Sturgis; July 26, 1846, Manila – February 11, 1890, Malvern, England) was an American author, based in England. She was notable for her collection and translation of Spanish-language folktales into English.

== Writing ==
Her first work Round a Posada Fire: Spanish Legends appeared in 1881. In the preface, she declares that her intention is to introduce her readers to an overlooked element of Spanish culture: that of peasant folktales. "There is hardly a more superstitious creature on the face of the globe than the Spaniard. He delights in everything ghostly and supernatural ..." she wrote. She noted that most of the stories have already been published in American journals, but added the new Lovers of Teruel, about a pair of star-crossed lovers who die from thwarted love.

In 1885, her Spanish Legendary Tales was published. It contained thirty folktales from northern Spain. She wrote in the preface: “Friends have remarked to me on the weird and tragic air of many of these tales. The answer is simply that such, as a fact, is the general character of the Spanish legend.” The tales speak of ghosts, witches, religious miracles and werewolves. The Serpent Woman and The Were-Wolf were both noted as early examples of speculative fiction in the Internet Speculative Fiction Database.

== Personal life ==
She was born in Manila, the daughter of United States Consul to the Philippines Henry Parkman Sturgis. The family made its fortune in trade between Canton and Manila through the firm Russell & Sturgis, co-founded by her father in 1828 as an offshoot of Russell & Co.

She was the cousin of British politician Henry Parkman Sturgis, who was named after her father. She was raised as Roman Catholic. She spoke Spanish, French, Italian, German, and English fluently.

She married English translator and journalist Samuel George Chetwynd Middlemore (1848-1890) on April 18, 1881 at the Palazzo Vecchio in Florence, where their wedding was attended by Henry James.

She died in 1890, only two weeks after her husband's death and was interred at Malvern. Her brother, Frederick Russell Sturgis, was her heir.

== List of works ==
=== Written works ===
- Songs of the Pyrenees with Spanish, French, and English Words (1877), with W. P. Blake. Reissued 1918.
- Round a Posada Fire: Spanish Legends (London: W. Satchell and Co., 1881).
- Spanish Legendary Tales (London: Chatto and Windus, 1885).

=== Arrangements and recordings ===
- A Basque Song: Alza, Alza (Boston: Arthur P. Schmidt & Co., c. 1886), with W. P. Blake.
- Linda Mia: Spanish Folk Song (Camden, N.J.: Victor Record, c. 1912). Recorded Jan. 10, 1905. Arranged by M.H. Sturgis, W.P. Blake.
- Linda Mia: Spanish Folk Song Recorded March 24, 1923. Arranged by M.H. Sturgis, W.P. Blake.
