= Inside GNSS =

- Editor and Publisher: Glen G. Gibbons
- Categories: Trade, satellite navigation, GPS, GNSS, GLONASS, Galileo, BeiDou
- Frequency: Every other month (print) and daily (web)
- Circulation: (In order of number of subscribers) North America, European Union, East Asia, Russian Federation, South America, Middle East
- Publisher: Glen G. Gibbons; Elizabeth A. Schmidkunz
- First issue: January 2006; 19 years ago
- Company: Gibbons Media and Research LLC
- Country: United States
- Based in: Eugene, Oregon
- Language: English
- Website: InsideGNSS.com
- ISSN: 1559-503X

Inside GNSS (IG) is an international controlled circulation trade magazine and website owned by Gibbons Media and Research LLC. It covers space-based positioning, navigation and timing (PNT) technology for engineers, designers, and policy-makers of global navigation satellite systems (GNSS). In the United States, GNSS is identified mainly with the government-operated Navstar Global Positioning System (GPS). InsideGNSS.com is the complimentary website of online news, events, digital newsletters, and webinars, and archived magazine articles.

== History ==
Inside GNSS began publication in January 2006; 19 years ago, by Gibbons Media and Research LLC, a private company based in Eugene, Oregon USA, and owned by Glen G. Gibbons and Elizabeth A. Schmidkunz.

== Circulation ==
The English-language print publication has a circulation of 30,000 qualified subscribers, of which 7,000 are outside the United States.

== Editions ==
The suite of publications includes:

- Six print and six digital editions per year;
- Online news, events, and archived magazine articles;
- Twice-monthly digital newsletters and web seminars on technical topics.

== Content ==
The Inside GNSS editorial content has been heavily weighted towards issues of the four major GNSS operators: the United States (GPS), Russia (GLONASS), China (BeiDou), and the European Union (Galileo). Regional and augmentation systems, such as those developed by the United States: (WAAS, SBAS); Japan: (QZSS); and Europe: (EGNOS); as well as eLoran, the terrestrial radio-navigation system, are also covered.

As GNSS systems have developed and evolved, the magazine has covered the integration of GNSS with other PNT technologies to improve user equipment in places where satellite signals are hard to obtain, the implications for manufacturers and policy-makers as more satellite signals and new systems become available, and the political and legal problems, and opportunities that arise as location-based technology becomes increasingly accurate.

Inside GNSS was the first publication to cover several GNSS political decisions and controversies, and the first outside of scholarly publications to cover several GNSS technical milestones. The magazine presented the first stories about:

- the decision for the common GPS / Galileo civilian signal,
- the transformation of the European Galileo system from a public-private partnership to a European Commission-controlled programme;
- the first analysis of the new Beidou signal,
- the patent dispute between the U.S. and the E.U. over the L1 signal development,
- the formation of the International Committee on GNSS of the United Nations Office for Outer Space Affairs,
- revitalization of the GLONASS system,
- and the first Galileo-only signal analysis.

=== List of major articles by subject ===
subject	articles
Galileo	More perils for Galileo . . . and other GNSS dramas, Inside GNSS, Vol. 2, No. 2, March–April 2007; GIOVE-B on the air: Understanding Galileo's new signals, Akos, D., Gao, G., Enge, P., Walter, T., Inside GNSS, Vol. 3, No. 4, May–June 2008; Galileo on its own: First position fix, Falcone, M., Binda, S., Breeuwer, E., Hahn, J., Spinelli, E., Gonzalez, F., López Risueño, G., Giordano, P., Swinden, R., Galluzzo, G., and Hedquist, A., Inside GNSS, Vol. 8, No. 2, March–April 2013
GLONASS	GLONASS has "preliminary approval" to transmit CDMA GLONASS signals at L1, L5, Inside GNSS, September 26, 2007; Replenishment of the GLONASS Constellation, Chebotarev, V., Kosenko, V., Bartenev, V., Inside GNSS, Vol. 2, No. 2, March–April 2007; Ivanov GLONASS Flap Obscures Program Reality, Gibbons, G., Inside GNSS, February 9, 2008; Russia Approves CDMA Signals for GLONASS, Discussing Common Signal Design, Gibbons, G., Inside GNSS, April 28, 2008; GLONASS–A New Look for the 21st Century, Gibbons, G., Inside GNSS, Vol. 3, No. 4, May–June 2008; Builders Notes: Russian GLONASS at the Stage of Active Implementation, Bartenev, V., Kosenko, V., Chebotarev, V., Inside GNSS, Vol. 1, No. 3, April 2006
BeiDou (compass)	Compass: And China's GNSS Makes Four, Inside GNSS, Vol. 1, No. 8, November–December 2006; GNSS over China: The Compass MEO satellite codes, Chen, A., De Lorenzo, D., Gao, G., Enge, P., Lo, S., Inside GNSS, Vol. 2, No. 5, July–August 2007; Compass MEO Satellite Signals:Initial Observations and Analysis, Ghion, A., de Latour, A., Dantepal, J., Ries, L., Grelier, T., Inside GNSS, Vol. 2, No. 4, May–June 2007
Signals	GNSS album: Images and spectral signatures of the new GNSS signals, Lo, S., Chen, A., Enge, P., Gao, G., Akos, D., Issler, J-L., Ries, L., Grelier, T., and Dantepal, J., Inside GNSS, Vol. 1, No. 4, May–June 2006
L5 Signal	Modernization milestone: Observing the first GPS satellite with an L5 payload, Chen, A., Parkinson, B., De Lorenzo, D., Akos, D., Gao, G., Heng, L., Enge, P., Lo, S., Walter, T., Inside GNSS, Vol. 4, No. 3, May–June 2009; First look: Observing the GPS L5 test transmission from SVN49 using software radio processing, Braasch, M., Gunawardena, S., Zhu, Z., Inside GNSS, Vol. 4, No. 3, May–June 2009; SVN49 and other GPS anomalies: Elevation-dependent pseudorange errors in Block IIRs and IIR-Ms, Springer, T., Dilssner, F., Inside GNSS, Vol. 4, No. 4, July–August 2009; On the air: New signals from the first GPS IIF satellite, Thölert, S., Erker, S., Meurer, M., Heng, L., Phelts, E., Gao, G., Wong, G., Walter, T., and Enge, P., Inside GNSS, Vol. 5, No. 5, July–August 2010
Common GPS / Galileo civil signal	MBOC: The New Optimized Spreading Modulation: Recommended for Galileo L1 OS and GPS L1C, Hein, G., Ávila-Rodríguez, J-A., Wallner, S., Betz, J., Hegarty, C., Rushanan, J., Kraay, A., Pratt, A., Lenahan, L., Owen, J., Issler, J-L. and Stansell, T., Inside GNSS, Vol. 1, No. 4, May–June 2006; BOC or MBOC?: The Common GPS/Galileo Civil Signal Design: A Manufacturers Dialog, Part 1, Stansell, T. with Fenton, P., Garin, L., Hatch, R., Knight, J., Rowitch, D., Sheynblat, L., Stratton, A., Studenny, J., and Weill, L., Inside GNSS, Vol. 1, No. 5, July–August 2006; BOC or MBOC?: The Common GPS/Galileo Civil Signal Design: A Manufacturers Dialog, Part 2, Gibbons, G. with Fenton, P., Garin, L., Hatch, R., Kawazoe, T., Keegan, R., Knight, J., Kohli, S., Rowitch, D., Sheynblat, L., Stratton, A., Studenny, J., Turetzky, G. and Weill, L., Inside GNSS, Vol. 1, No. 6, September 2006
Civil signal patent dispute	Common GPS Galileo Civil Signal Could Go Back on the Table in Patent Dispute, Divis, D. A., Inside GNSS, April 30, 2012; MBOC Patent Dispute Could Affect U.S. Military, European Civil GNSS Users, Divis, D. A., Inside GNSS, May 19, 2012; USPTO Nears Approval of Troubling British Patent on New GPS Civil Signal, Divis, D. A., Inside GNSS, Vol. 7, No. 3, May–June 2012; A European Perspective on Patent Dispute over GPS-Galileo Civil Signal, Divis, D. A., Inside GNSS, Vol. 7, No. 3, May–June 2012; Brit Military Visit May Hasten Resolution of GPS Signal Patent Dispute, Divis, D. A., Inside GNSS, Vol. 7, No. 4, July–August 2012; UK Revokes Key GNSS Patent That Sparked Dispute over Cooperation, Interoperability, Divis, D. A., Inside GNSS, October 31, 2012
Beidou signal	GNSS over China: The Compass MEO satellite codes, Chen, A., De Lorenzo, D., Gao, G., Enge, P., Lo, S., Inside GNSS, Vol. 2, No. 5, July–August 2007; China adds details to Compass (Beidou II) signal plans, Inside GNSS, Vol. 3, No. 6, September–October 2008; China reveals updated Compass/ Beidou-2 GNSS signal plan, Inside GNSS, August 10, 2009; China begins broadcasts on latest Compass GNSS GEO satellite, Inside GNSS, June 11, 2010; China publishes official signal-in-space ICD for BeiDou satellite navigation open service, Inside GNSS, January 8, 2013
GPS origin dispute	National Inventors Hall of Fame 2010 inductees include TIMATION developer, Inside GNSS, March 31, 2010; Letters: TIMATION developer's honor draws fire, Inside GNSS, Vol. 5, No. 3, May 2010
United Nations Office of Outer Space Affairs International Committee on GNSS (ICG)	ICG Working Group Takes On Issues, Inside GNSS, Vol. 1, No. 3, April 2006; ICG sets up new Providers Forum to pursue compatibility among GNSS systems, augmentation systems, Gibbons, G., Inside GNSS, Vol. 2, No. 6, September–October 2007

== Staff ==
The editor and publisher is Glen Gibbons, an Oregon journalist who has covered GNSS continuously since 1989, six years before the first U.S. satellite constellation was fully operational in 1995. In 2003, he received the U.S. Institute of Navigation's Norman P. Hays award for inspiration and support contributing to the advancement of navigation. He was the founding editor of GPS World, Galileo's World, and GPS World Newsletter.

The magazine's Washington correspondent, Dee Ann Divis, received the Robert D.G. Lewis Watchdog Award from the Society of Professional Journalists Washington D.C. Pro Chapter (SPJDC) in 2012 for the extensive coverage of the LightSquared communications network, and the controversy over its interference with GPS signals during 2011 and 2012. Divis also won the SPJDC's Dateline Award for Washington Correspondent in both 2012 and 2013. In 2009, Richard Fischer, a former Advanstar Communications vice-president and general manager joined Inside GNSS as Director of Business Development. Gwen Rhoads has served as the magazine's art director since 2006, and Peggie Kegel has been the magazine's circulation director since its founding.

In addition to Gibbons and Divis, the contributing editors are:

- Günter Hein, head of Galileo and EGNOS Operations and Evolution for the European Space Agency, and a member of the European Commission's signal task force.
- Mark Petovello, a professor of geomatics engineering at the University of Calgary (Alberta, Canada), and a member of the Position Location and Navigation research group.
- European correspondent Peter Gutierrez, a senior reporter and editor based in Brussels, Belgium, who covers Europe's GNSS programmes.

The magazine has an international Editorial Advisory Council that includes several pioneer developers of GPS technology, including co-inventor of the Global Positioning System Bradford Parkinson, A.J. van Dierendonck, Tom Stansell, Phil Ward, and GPS policy developer Jules McNeff.
