= John Henckel =

Chief Justice of Jamaica

John Henckel was Chief Justice of Jamaica in 1801.
