= List of chief justices of Jamaica =

List of Chief Justices of the Supreme Court of Jamaica

The chief justice of Jamaica is the chief judge of the Supreme Court of Jamaica. This article lists chief justices from before and after Jamaica's independence in 1962.

== British colony (1655–1962) ==
- Philip Ward (1661–)
- Samuel Barry (c.1661–)
- William Mitchell (1663)
- Sir Thomas Lynch (1664–1665)
- John White (1671–) (John White (governor)?)
- Sir Thomas Modyford (1675)
- Samuel Long (1676–1679)
- Robert Byndloss (1681–)
- Samuel Bernard (1685–) (Samuel Bernard (Jamaica)?)
- Robert Noell (1688)
- Roger Elletson (1689)
- Richard Lloyd (1689)
- Richard Lloyd (1695–1698)
- Sir Nicholas Lawes (1698–1703), Governor of Jamaica (1718-1722)
- Peter Beckford (1703–)
- John Walters (1706–)
- Peter Heywood (1714–1715)
- Peter Bernard (1716–)
- John Ayscough (1724–)
- Edward Pennant
- Richard Mill (1733)
- John Gregory (1733–35)
- James Hay (1735)
- George Ellis (1736–1739)
- John Gregory (1739)
- Dennis Kelly (1742–)
- William Nedham (1746–)
- John Hudson Guy (1749–)
- John Palmer (1751–1756)
- Rose Fuller (1753–?1755)
- Thomas Fearon (1756–1764)
- George Ellis (1765–)
- Thomas Beach (1766–)
- Peter Haywood (1770–)
- Edward Webley (1776–)
- Richard Welch (1779)
- Thomas French (1780–1783)
- John Grant (1784–1791)
- Thomas Harrison (1790–) (acting)
- William Jackson (1792–)
- John Henckel (1801–)
- John Kirby (1802–)
- John Lewis (1808–)
- Thomas Witter Jackson (1818–1821)
- Sir William Anglin Scarlett (1821–1831)
- Sir Joshua Rowe (1832–)
- Sir Bryan Edwards (1855–)
- Sir John Lucie-Smith (1869–)
- Sir Adam Gibb Ellis (1884–1894)
- Sir Henry James Burford-Hancock (January 1895 – October 1895)
- Sir Fielding Clarke (January 1896–1911)
- Sir Anthony Coll (January 1911 – 1922)
- Anthony de Freitas (acting July 1922 – September 1923)
- Sir Charles St John Branch (June 1923 – January 1925)
- Anthony de Freitas (acting January 1925 – February 1926)
- Sir Fiennes Barrett-Lennard (1926-1932)
- Robert Lyall-Grant (August 1932 – 1936)
- George Harry Franklyn Cannon (acting 1935)
- Robert Howard Furness (April 1936 – 1944)
- Sir Hector Horace Hearne (1944?–1951)
- Sir Kenneth O'Connor (1951–1954)
- John Edward Doston Carberry (1954–1958?)
- Sir Colin MacGregor (1957–1962)

== Independent Jamaica (since 1962) ==
- Sir Rowland Phillips (1963–1968)
- Sir Allen Lewis (acting 1966)
- Sir Herbert Duffus (1968–1973)
- Hon. Kenneth Smith (1973–1984)
- Sir Edward Zacca (1985–1996)
- Hon. Lensley Wolfe (1996–2007)
- Hon. Zaila McCalla (2007–2018)
- Hon. Bryan Sykes (2018–Present)
