= Roger Elletson (judge) =

Chief Justice of Jamaica

Roger Elletson was Chief Justice of Jamaica in 1689.
