= Robert Howard Furness =

Sir Robert Howard Furness (1880–1959) was a British Chief Justice of Barbados, after which he became Chief Justice of Jamaica from April 1936.

== Life ==
He was the son of Robert Pratt Furness of Preston, Lancashire, a business agent for Pearson & Knowles Ltd., and his wife Margaret Rue, born in 1880. He was educated at King William's College, becoming a solicitor. He worked for Rawsthorn, Ambler & Booth, in Preston.

Furness moved to British Honduras (now Belize) to practice in 1906. He took the post of Registrar-General there in 1913. He served in World War I, commanding the 1st British Honduras War Contingent of 129 Belizean men who sailed for Europe on HMT Verdala on 4 November 1915; and then as an officer in the British West Indies Regiment, in France and Egypt. He was called to the bar at Lincoln's Inn in 1919.

Furness then held legal posts in Tanganyika and Trinidad and Tobago, where he was Solicitor-General. He was Chief Justice in Barbados from 1926 to 1936; then Chief Justice in Jamaica. He was knighted in 1929. He died in the Mandeville Nursing Home on 1 March 1959.

== Family ==
Furness married in 1917 Helen Frances Elizabeth Smyth, daughter of Arthur Smyth of Garvagh, Royal Marine Light Infantry. They had one daughter.

Charles Clifford Furness DSO (born 1877) was his brother.
