= Euan Lucie-Smith =

British Army second lieutenant of World War I (1889–1915)

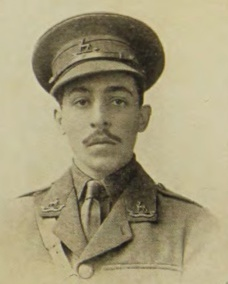
- Born: 14 December 1889; Cross Roads
- Died: 25 April 1915
- Education: Berkhamsted School, Eastbourne College
- Occupation: Officer
- Father: John Barkley Lucie-Smith
- Relatives: John Dudley Lucie-Smith

Euan Lucie-Smith (14 December 1889 – 25 April 1915) was a British Army second lieutenant of World War I, of mixed British and Afro-Caribbean descent.

He was one of the first mixed-heritage infantry officers in a regular British Army regiment, (Note: Nathaniel Wells, the son of a white plantation owner and a black slave, received a Yeomanry commission in 1818; Allan Noel Minns, DSO, MC, was commissioned in the Royal Army Medical Corps in September 1914.) and the first killed in World War I.

== Early life ==
Lucie-Smith was born on 14 December 1889 at Cross Roads, St Andrew, Jamaica, the younger son of Catherine, the granddaughter (Note: Sanderson says "daughter") of Samuel Constantine Burke, a lawyer and politician referred to as "coloured"; and John Barkley Lucie-Smith, (Note: Sometimes spelled 'John Barkly Lucie-Smith') a white colonial civil servant who was Postmaster of Jamaica. His grandfather was John Lucie-Smith, Chief Justice of Jamaica, and an uncle was Alfred Lucie-Smith; (Note: Alfred also had a son called Euan: Euan William Lucie-Smith MC) the art critic Edward Lucie-Smith (born 1933) is his nephew.

He was educated at Berkhamsted School, and then Eastbourne College, both private schools in England.

On 10 November 1911, he enrolled in the Jamaica Militia Artillery, as a commissioned officer. His father had commanded the Militia Artillery.

== Military career and death ==
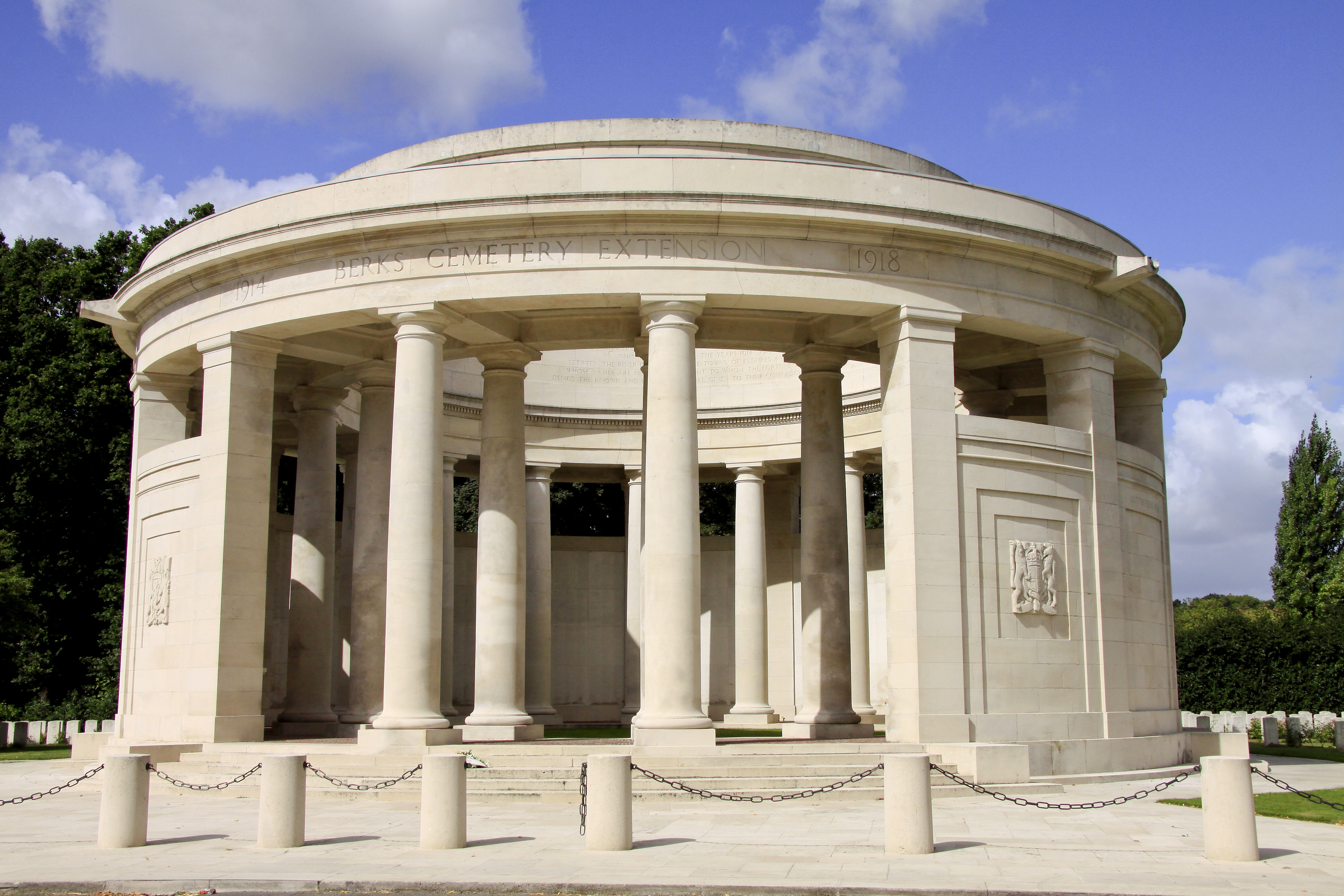
The Ploegsteert Memorial to the Missing

Six weeks into the First World War, Lucie-Smith joined the 1st Battalion, Royal Warwickshire Regiment as a second lieutenant, announced in the London Gazette on 30 November 1914, with seniority to others from Australia, Canada, India, South Africa and New Zealand. He travelled to England in December 1914, and undertook training on the Isle of Wight. He then went to France on 17 March 1915, and was killed in the Second Battle of Ypres on 25 April 1915, age 25. A witness said he was shot through the head, but his body was never found. He was the first-known mixed-heritage officer killed in the war and is commemorated on the Ploegsteert Memorial to the Missing in Belgium and on the memorials at Berkhamsted School and Eastbourne College.

== Memorial Plaque ==
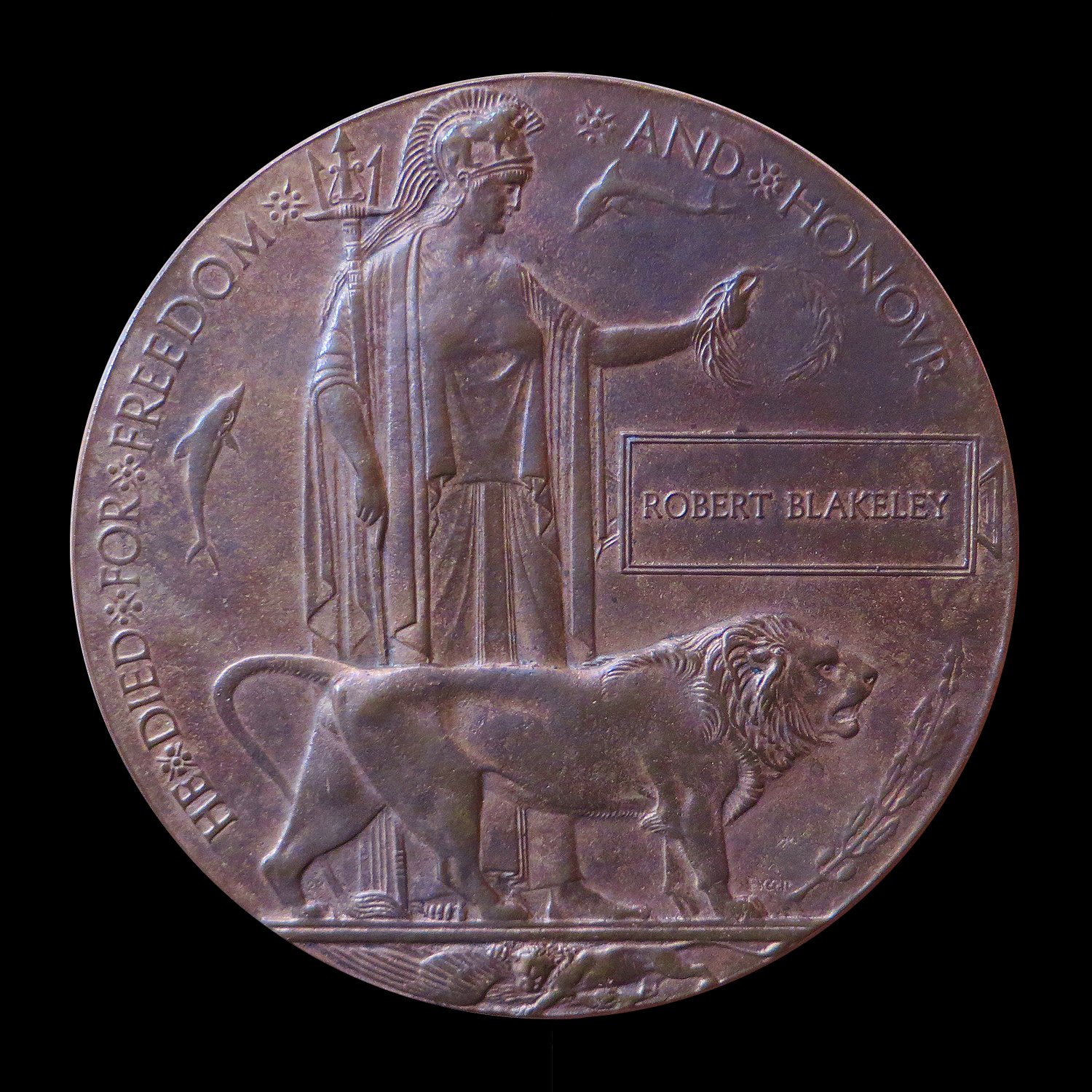
A Memorial Plaque similar to Lucie-Smith's (Note: Auctioneer's pictures show a plaque whose name-panel has "Evan [sic]" on the first line and "Lucie-Smith" on the second)

Lucie-Smith's story came to renewed public attention after his Memorial Plaque was purchased by James Carver in August 2020. In researching Lucie-Smith, Carver realised from a photograph that he did not appear to be white. Carver put the plaque up for auction in November 2020, when it was sold to the Royal Regiment of Fusiliers Museum (Royal Warwickshire) for a hammer price £8,500, (Note: £10,540 with fees) a record price for such plaques.
