= Colin MacGregor =

Jamaican judge (1901–1982)

Sir Colin Malcolm MacGregor (10 April 1901 – 6 September 1982) was Chief Justice of Jamaica from 1957 to 1962. He was the first chief justice to be native born. MacGregor was a deacon of the Anglican church. He was knighted on June 13, 1959.

The Colin MacGregor Memorial Prize is awarded in his memory to outstanding law students by the University of the West Indies.
