= Lensley Wolfe =

Jamaican judge and Chief Justice (1937–2023)

Lensley Hugh Wolfe (19 June 1937 – 18 April 2023) was a Jamaican judge who was Chief Justice of Jamaica from 1996 to 2007.

Wolfe attended St. Jago High School. He was admitted to Lincoln's Inn on 26 January 1960.

Wolfe died on 18 April 2023, at the age of 85.
