= David Palmer Ross =

British surgeon (1842–1904)

Sir David Palmer Ross KB CMG
- Born: 13 September 1842
- Died: 30 May 1904 (aged 61)
- Education: University of Edinburgh
- Occupation: Surgeon
- Spouse: Mary Eliza Heslop (m. 1867; died 1898)
- Children: 5, including F. W. Forbes Ross

Sir David Palmer Ross KB, CMG, (13 September 1842 – 30 May 1904) was Surgeon General of the Colony of British Guiana.

== Biography ==
Born in Penang, formerly within the Straits Settlements, on 13 September 1842, he was the son of Dr. John Ross, and was sent to Dumfries Academy to be educated, after the death of his parents. In 1863, he received his medical degree from the University of Edinburgh and entered the Army Medical Staff. Four years later, he joined the Colonial Service, and took up the post of medical officer to the Public Hospital in Jamaica, acting as Director of the hospital from 1870 to 1874, and then Senior Medical Officer. In 1867, he married Mary Eliza Heslop (daughter of Alexander Heslop, the then Attorney General of Jamaica). In 1885, he took up the post of Colonial Surgeon at Sierra Leone, then part of British Guiana after serving in Jamaica for 21 years. He was knighted by letters patent in 1900.

His eldest son was surgeon F. W. Forbes Ross. Sir David's other children were: George Herbert Kemp Ross, MD; James Reginal Blair Ross (who was a Chief Justice of Nigeria); Meta Mary Ruth Ross (who married Sir Alfred Van Waterschoodt Lucie-Smith, a former Chief Justice of Trinidad & Tobago); and Arthur Charles John Ross.
