= Jamaica Bar =

Jamaican organisation

- Type: Bar association
- Region served: Jamaica

The Jamaican Bar Association is a voluntary organisation of attorneys-at-law called to the Jamaican Bar. It was formed on 16 January 1973. The association is not a regulatory or disciplinary body and has no power to hear complaints against attorneys, even if they are members of the association.

It strives to maintain and strengthen the rule of law and human rights, to protect the independence of judges and attorneys-at-law, to reform and improve the local legal system, to offer services to those in need, to foster legal education, and to protect the integrity of the legal profession in Jamaica.

== See also ==
- Commonwealth Lawyers Association (CLA)
