= Judiciary of Jamaica =

The judiciary of Jamaica is based on the judiciary of the United Kingdom. The courts are organized at four levels, with additional provision for appeal to the Judicial Committee of the Privy Council in London. The Court of Appeal is the highest appellate court. The Supreme Court has unlimited jurisdiction in all cases, and sits as the Circuit Court to try criminal cases. The Parish Court (formerly known as the Resident Magistrate's court) in each parish hears both criminal and civil cases, excluding grave offences. The Petty Sessions are held under Justices of the Peace, with power to hear minor crimes.

Jamaica is a common law jurisdiction, in which precedents from English law and British Commonwealth tradition may be taken into account.

== Court of Appeal ==
The Court of Appeal is the highest appellate court in Jamaica; it is superior to the Supreme Court. The Court is composed of a President and six other Judges. The Chief Justice is also a judge ex officio of the Court of Appeal, but participates only when asked to do so by the President. Although the Court of Appeal is the highest court in Jamaica, its judgements may themselves be appealed to the King-in-Council, in which case they are heard by the Judicial Committee of the Privy Council in London.

In May 2015, the House of Representatives approved with the necessary two-thirds majority bills to end legal appeals to the Judicial Committee of the Privy Council and make the Caribbean Court of Justice (CCJ) as Jamaica's final court of appeal. However, the bill did not pass.in the Senate. The King and Privy Council retain the final right of appeal, but CCJ does oversee cases relating to CARICOM.

== Supreme Court ==
The Supreme Court has unlimited original jurisdiction in criminal and civil cases. The Chief Justice of the Supreme Court is the head of the judiciary (currently Bryan Sykes). Besides the Chief Justice, the court is composed of the Senior Puisne Judge and additional Puisne Judges, with their number established by Parliament. The Court currently has 43 justices.

The Supreme Court has a number of divisions, in which a subset of the justices hear specific types of cases. The Circuit Court is the division for criminal cases, holding sessions in the individual parishes. The Justices of the Peace (Appeals) Act states that the "Circuit Court for every parish in this Island shall be the Appeal Court for matters arising in every such parish." Other divisions of the Supreme Court are the Gun Court, the Commercial Court, the Revenue Court, and the Family Court. In the civil division of the Supreme Court the judge sits alone without the jury, except in cases of defamation. The Supreme Court also serves as a Constitutional Court for Jamaica.

== Parish Courts ==
Each parish has a Parish Court with power to hear civil and criminal matters. The jurisdiction of each court extends one mile beyond the border of its parish. Severe crimes such as rape, treason, and murder are not tried by the Parish Courts, but are referred to the Supreme Court after a preliminary hearing.

The Parish Courts also have a number of divisions, including the Family Court, Coroners Court, Tax Court, Juvenile Court, Traffic Court, Small Claims Court, Night Court, Drug Court, and Gun Court (Parish Court Division).

Resident Magistrates or Parish Court are appointed by the Governor General on recommendation of the Judicial Services Commission. They are assigned to a parish by the Chief Justice and report to the Chief Justice. The minimum qualification for the Resident Magistrate is five (5) years at the Bar.

== Petty Sessions ==
The Petty Sessions hear minor criminal matters, such as resisting arrest. Justices of the Peace serve as judges in the Petty Sessions. Petty Session Courts require a minimum of two Justices of the Peace, to be properly constituted.

== Caribbean Court of Justice ==
In 2001 Jamaica signed the agreement establishing the Caribbean Court of Justice. The Court has a dual role: it has original jurisdiction and functions as an international court in interpreting and applying the Treaty of Chaguaramas, which established CARICOM; and it is intended to replace the Privy Council as a court of last appeal for the countries of the Commonwealth Caribbean.

In 2004 the Jamaican Parliament approved the establishment of the CCJ as the highest court in its Original Jurisdiction in the interpretation of the Revised Treaty of Chagaramus, while at the same time attempting to replace Privy Council as the final appellate court in Jamaica. However, in 2005 the Privy Council struck down the change to the final appellate court as unconstitutional because the Privy Council's status is an entrenched provision in the Jamaican Constitution and as such more would be required to remove the Privy Council as the final appellate court. The Council ruled that although Parliament was within its powers to remove appellate jurisdiction from the Privy Council, it could not grant jurisdiction to the CCJ through an ordinary act. Instead, such a change must meet the more rigorous standards for amending "entrenched" provisions of the Jamaican Constitution. As of June 2015, three bills which would abolish appeals to the Privy Council and make the CCJ Jamaica's final court of appeal had passed the House of Representatives and sent to the Senate where to be approved by a two-thirds majority to become law. None of these measures succeeded; as a result, the Privy Council remains the final court of appeal.

== See also ==
- Chief Justices of Jamaica
