= Lists of years by topic =

This is a list of lists of years by topic.

== Arts, communication, and technology ==
- List of years in animation
- List of years in anime
- List of years in architecture
- List of years in art
- List of years in aviation
- List of years in comics
- List of years in film
- List of years in games
- List of years in literature
- List of years in music
- List of years in poetry
- List of years in radio
- List of years in rail transport
- List of years in sumo
- List of years in television
- List of years in video games

== Crime ==
- Timeline of organized crime
- List of years in piracy

== Philosophy and science ==
- List of years in anthropology
- List of years in archaeology
- List of years in the environment
- List of years in paleontology
- List of years in philosophy
- List of years in science
- List of years in spaceflight

== Countries ==
- List of years in Afghanistan
- List of years in Albania
- List of years in Algeria
- List of years in Andorra
- List of years in Angola
- List of years in Antarctica
- List of years in Antigua and Barbuda
- List of years in Argentina
- List of years in Armenia
- List of years in Australia
- List of years in Austria
- List of years in Azerbaijan
- List of years in Bangladesh
- List of years in the Bahamas
- List of years in Bahrain
- List of years in Barbados
- List of years in Belarus
- List of years in Belgium
- List of years in Belize
- List of years in Benin
- List of years in Bhutan
- List of years in Bolivia
- List of years in Bosnia and Herzegovina
- List of years in Botswana
- List of years in Brazil
- List of years in Brunei
- List of years in Bulgaria
- List of years in Burkina Faso
- List of years in Burundi
- List of years in Cambodia
- List of years in Cameroon
- List of years in Canada
- List of years in Cape Verde
- List of years in the Central African Republic
- List of years in Chad
- List of years in Chile
- List of years in China
- List of years in Colombia
- List of years in Costa Rica
- List of years in Comoros
- List of years in Republic of the Congo
- List of years in the Democratic Republic of the Congo
- List of years in Croatia
- List of years in Cuba
- List of years in Cyprus
- List of years in the Czech Republic
- List of years in Denmark
- List of years in Djibouti
- List of years in Dominica
- List of years in the Dominican Republic
- List of years in East Timor
- List of years in Ecuador
- List of years in Egypt
- List of years in El Salvador
- List of years in Eritrea
- List of years in Estonia
- List of years in Ethiopia
- List of years in Eswatini
- List of years in Equatorial Guinea
- List of years in Fiji
- List of years in Finland
- List of years in France
- List of years in Gabon
- List of years in the Gambia
- List of years in Georgia
- List of years in Germany
- List of years in Ghana
- List of years in Greece
- List of years in Grenada
- List of years in Guatemala
- List of years in Guinea
- List of years in Guinea-Bissau
- List of years in Guyana
- List of years in Haiti
- List of years in Honduras
- List of years in Hong Kong
- List of years in Hungary
- List of years in Iceland
- List of years in India
- List of years in Indonesia
- List of years in Iran
- List of years in Iraq
- List of years in Ireland
- List of years in Israel
- List of years in Italy
- List of years in Ivory Coast
- List of years in Jamaica
- List of years in Japan
- List of years in Jordan
- List of years in Kazakhstan
- List of years in Kenya
- List of years in Kiribati
- List of years in Kosovo
- List of years in Kuwait
- List of years in Kyrgyzstan
- List of years in Laos
- List of years in Latvia
- List of years in Lebanon
- List of years in Lesotho
- List of years in Liberia
- List of years in Liechtenstein
- List of years in Libya
- List of years in Lithuania
- List of years in Luxembourg
- List of years in Macau
- List of years in Madagascar
- List of years in the Marshall Islands
- List of years in Malawi
- List of years in Malaysia
- List of years in the Maldives
- List of years in Mali
- List of years in Malta
- List of years in Mandatory Palestine
- List of years in Mauritius
- List of years in Mauritania
- List of years in Mexico
- List of years in the Federated States of Micronesia
- List of years in Moldova
- List of years in Monaco
- List of years in Mongolia
- List of years in Montenegro
- List of years in Morocco
- List of years in Mozambique
- List of years in Myanmar
- List of years in Nauru
- List of years in Namibia
- List of years in Nepal
- List of years in the Netherlands
- List of years in New Zealand
- List of years in Nicaragua
- List of years in Niger
- List of years in Nigeria
- List of years in North Korea
- List of years in North Macedonia
- List of years in Northern Ireland
- List of years in Norway
- List of years in Oman
- List of years in Pakistan
- List of years in Palau
- List of years in Palestine
- List of years in Panama
- List of years in Papua New Guinea
- List of years in Paraguay
- List of years in Peru
- List of years in Puerto Rico
- List of years in the Philippines
- List of years in Poland
- List of years in Portugal
- List of years in Qatar
- List of years in Romania
- List of years in Russia
- List of years in Rwanda
- List of years in Saint Kitts and Nevis
- List of years in Saint Lucia
- List of years in Saint Vincent and the Grenadines
- List of years in Samoa
- List of years in San Marino
- List of years in Saudi Arabia
- List of years in Senegal
- List of years in Serbia
- List of years in Seychelles
- List of years in Sierra Leone
- List of years in Singapore
- List of years in Slovakia
- List of years in Slovenia
- List of years in Somalia
- List of years in Somaliland
- List of years in South Africa
- List of years in the Solomon Islands
- List of years in South Korea
- List of years in South Sudan
- List of years in Spain
- List of years in Sri Lanka
- List of years in Sudan
- List of years in Suriname
- List of years in Sweden
- List of years in Switzerland
- List of years in Syria
- List of years in Taiwan
- List of years in Tajikistan
- List of years in Tanzania
- List of years in Thailand
- List of years in Togo
- List of years in Tonga
- List of years in Trinidad and Tobago
- List of years in Tunisia
- List of years in Turkey
- List of years in Turkmenistan
- List of years in Tuvalu
- List of years in Uganda
- List of years in Ukraine
- List of years in the United Arab Emirates
- List of years in the United Kingdom
- List of years in the United States
- List of years in Uruguay
- List of years in Uzbekistan
- List of years in Vanuatu
- List of years in Vatican City
- List of years in Venezuela
- List of years in Vietnam
- List of years in Yemen
- List of years in Zambia
- List of years in Zimbabwe

== Politics and international relations ==
- Lists of sovereign states by year
- Lists of state leaders by year
- List of years in politics

== See also ==
- List of years
