= 2026 in Nauru =

- Decades: 2000s; 2010s; 2020s
- See also: Other events of 2026; Timeline of Nauruan history

Events in the year 2026 in Nauru.

== Incumbents ==
- President: David Adeang
- Vice President: Lionel Aingimea (since 16 April)
- Speaker of Parliament: Marcus Stephen

== Events ==
- 31 March – Parliament unanimously passes a constitutional amendment to extend the parliamentary term from 3 to 4 years after the amendment failed to pass via referendum in October 2025.
- 16 April – Lionel Aingimea is sworn in as the first Vice President of Nauru.
- 13 May – The Parliament of Nauru passes a constitutional amendment to change the name of the country to Naoero.
- 30 July – The Nauruan government revokes its recognition of the independence of Abkhazia and South Ossetia.
- 3 August – Nauru changes its official name to the Republic of Naoero, which matches the spelling and pronunciation of the Nauruan language.
- 7 September – Nauru inaugurates its first Israeli embassy in Jerusalem.

== Holidays ==
- 1 January – New Year's Day
- 31 January – Independence Day
- 8 March – International Women's Day
- 18 April – Good Friday
- 21 April – Easter Monday
- 22 April – Easter Tuesday
- 17 May – Constitution Day
- 1 July – RONPhos Handover Day
- 19 August – Ibumin Earoeni Day
- 25 September – National Youth Day
- 26 October – Angam Day
- 25 December – Christmas Day
- 26 December – Boxing Day

== Deaths ==
- 25 February – Ludwig Scotty, 77, former president (2003, 2004–2007) and five-time speaker of the Parliament
