= 2013 in Jamaica =

- Decades: 1990s; 2000s; 2010s; 2020s
- See also: Other events of 2013; Timeline of Jamaican history

Events in the year 2013 in Jamaica.

== Incumbents ==
- Monarch: Elizabeth II
- Governor-General: Patrick Allen
- Prime Minister: Portia Simpson-Miller
- Chief Justice: Zaila McCalla

== Events ==
- 21 July – Murder of Dwayne Jones
- 11 September – At least one person is killed and several Jamaica Constabulary Force officers injured following a melee at the police lockup in the town of Mandeville.

== Deaths ==
- 14 January – Neville Bonitto, 88, cricketer
- 3 April – Harry J, 67, music producer, studio owner and musician
- 10 April – Olive Lewin, 85, social anthropologist and musicologist
- 3 May – Cedric Brooks, 70, musician (The Skatalites)
- 15 June – Joseph Hibbert, 65, politician, MP for St. Andrew East Rural (2002–2011), Minister for Transport and Works
- 28 June – Fred Gibson, 101, Jamaican-born English cricketer
- 17 July – George Lyn, 81, politician, MP for North Central Clarendon (1993–2002)
- 26 July – Douglas Manley, 91, politician, MP for South Manchester (1972–1976)
- 11 September – Prince Jazzbo, 62, reggae DJ
- 9 October – Seymour Mullings, 82, politician and diplomat, Deputy Prime Minister (1993–2001), Ambassador to the United States (2001–2004)
- 17 November – Herbert Gordon, 61, Jamaican footballer
- 2 December – Junior Murvin, 67, reggae singer ("Police and Thieves")
- 21 December – Richard Hart, 96, historian and politician
