= 2012 in Jamaica =

- Decades: 1990s; 2000s; 2010s; 2020s
- See also: Other events of 2012; Timeline of Jamaican history

Events in the year 2012 in Jamaica.

== Incumbents ==
- Monarch: Elizabeth II
- Governor-General: Patrick Allen
- Prime Minister: Andrew Holness (until 5 January); Portia Simpson-Miller onwards
- Chief Justice: Zaila McCalla

== Events ==
- 5 January – Portia Simpson Miller is sworn in for the second time as the prime minister of Jamaica.
- 6 January – Prime Minister Portia Simpson-Miller announces that the country is to become a republic, with plans to remove Queen Elizabeth II as head of state and the Jamaican monarchy in general.
- 8 June – Jamaican "drug lord" Christopher "Dudus" Coke is sentenced to 23 years in a U.S. prison.
- 5 August – At the 2012 Summer Olympics in London, In athletics, sprinter Usain Bolt of Jamaica wins the 100 metres final.
- 9 August – Usain Bolt becomes the first person to win the 100m and 200m events in back-to-back Summer Olympics.
- 11 August – Usain Bolt wins a third gold medal of the 2012 Olympics as he anchors Jamaica's sprint relay team to a world record.
- 25 October – Hurricane Sandy affects Jamaica.

== Deaths ==
- 16 January – Joe Bygraves, 80, Jamaican born British former British Empire heavyweight champion boxer.
- 19 January –
  - Winston Riley, 65, reggae musician and producer.
  - Errol Scorcher, 55, reggae disc jockey.
- 20 January – Dudley Thompson, 95, politician and diplomat.
- 31 January – King Stitt, 71, singer.
- 10 February – Wilmot Perkins, 80, radio personality.
- 14 March – Carl Rattray, 82, jurist and politician, Attorney General (1989–1993) and president of the Court of Appeal (1993–1999).
- 16 March – Irvin Iffla, 88, cricketer.
- 3 May – Lloyd Brevett, 80, double bassist (The Skatalites).
- 22 May – Hazel Monteith, 94, consumer rights advocate.
- 25 May – Keith Gardner, 82, Olympic bronze medal-winning (1960) athlete.
- 26 May – Roy Wilson, 72, singer (Higgs and Wilson).
- 3 June – Andy Hamilton, 94, Jamaican-born British saxophonist and composer.
- 15 June –
  - George Kerr, 74, athlete.
  - Arthur Henry Winnington Williams, 99, parliamentarian.
- 1 July – Ossie Hibbert, 62, musician.
- 29 June – Sluggy Ranks, 45, dancehall musician.
- 7 August – Ranking Trevor, 60, reggae musician.
- 14 October – Buster Pearson, 71, musician, father and manager of Five Star.
- 28 October – Mel Spence, 76, Olympic sprinter.
- 3 November – Duke Vin, 84, Jamaican-born British disk jockey and sound system operator.
- 14 November – Bertram McLean, 64, musician.
- 1 December – Ezroy Millwood, 70, transport businessman.
- 27 December – Lloyd Charmers, 74, singer and record producer.
