= Trevor Harris (disambiguation) =

Trevor Harris may refer to:

- Trevor Harris (born 1986), American football player
- Trevor Harris (footballer) (born 1936), English footballer
- Trevor S. Harris, American economist
- Trevor Boots Harris (1940s–2014), Jamaican journalist and broadcaster
