= List of years in video games =

This is a chronological list of years in video games that indexes the years in video games pages. Years are annotated with significant events in the history of video games.

== 1970s ==
- 1970 – Initial development begins on the first commercial video game, Computer Space. The first North American Computer Chess Championship is held.
- 1971 – Computer Space and Galaxy Game are released. The Oregon Trail is first demonstrated.
- 1972 – The Magnavox Odyssey, the first home video game console, is released, along with the arcade machine Pong.
- 1973 – Pong and similar titles dominate the arcade sector, Gotcha, Space Race and Maze War are also released.
- 1974 – Tank is released, as well as the early first first-person shooter Spasim.
- 1975 – Speed Race releases internationally, along with the first ever RPG Dungeon.
- 1976 – The Fairchild Channel F releases, the first console to have cartridges. The highest selling arcade game of the year is F-1.
- 1977 – The Atari Video Computer System (later the Atari 2600) is released as the first widely popular home video game console.
- 1978 – Space Invaders is released, popularizing the medium and beginning the golden age of arcade video games.
- 1979 – The first handheld console, the Microvision is released. Other key titles that year include Galaxian and Asteroids.

== 1980s ==
- 1980 – Pac-Man & King's Quest are released, and Nintendo enters the handheld market with the Game & Watch series. Rogue inspires the Roguelike genre.
- 1981 – Donkey Kong, Frogger, Bosconian, Centipede and 005 are among the notable releases that were introduced. Vanguard pioneers the scrolling shooter genre. Jump Bug further innovates scrolling shooters.
- 1982 – The number of arcades in the United States reaches its peak. Q*bert, Dig Dug, Donkey Kong Junior and Ms. Pac-Man are released. In hardware, the Commodore 64 and ZX Spectrum are also released.
- 1983 – Mario Bros. and Dragon's Lair and released. The industry crashes in the United States, resulting in 20 years of Japanese domination. Nintendo release the Famicom, beginning the 8-bit era.
- 1984 – The first beat-em-up game Kung-Fu Master is released along with Duck Hunt, Wrecking Crew and Punch-Out!!
- 1985 – Super Mario, Tetris; The Nintendo Entertainment System is released as an international version of the Famicom.
- 1986 – The Legend of Zelda launches along with Kid Icarus and Super Mario Bros.: The Lost Levels; the Metroidvania genre is sparked by Metroid and Castlevania respectively; in hardware the Sega Master System releases in North America.
- 1987 – Mega Man, Street Fighter, The Adventure of Link and Final Fantasy debut. Additionally, Out Run is highly influential in the development of racing games.
- 1988 – Ninja Gaiden, Super Mario Bros. 2, Super Mario Bros. 3 and the debut of the Sega Mega Drive in Japan.
- 1989 – The 16-bit era begins in North America with the TurboGrafx-16 and Sega Genesis. The Game Boy is released to great success. Mother, Prince of Persia, Super Mario Land and Final Fight are released.

== 1990s ==
- 1990 – Nintendo releases the Super Nintendo Entertainment System in Japan. The Nintendo World Championships begin, an early example of Esports. Super Mario World and Fire Emblem are released.
- 1991 – The Legend of Zelda: A Link to the Past and Street Fighter II launch; it and its updated variants dominate the arcade sector for several years. Sonic the Hedgehog debuts.
- 1992 – Mortal Kombat, Mario Kart, Ecco the Dolphin, Streets of Rage 2 and Kirby, the arcade version of Virtua Racing is Sega's first 3D title.
- 1993 – Doom launches, greatly influencing and popularizing the first person shooter genre. NBA Jam is influential in sports. Star Fox, Ridge Racer, The Lost Vikings, The Legend of Zelda: Link's Awakening, Samurai Shodown and Myst launch.
- 1994 – Sony enters the console market with the PlayStation. Also released are Super Metroid, EarthBound, Tekken and the debut of the Elder Scrolls franchise with Arena.
- 1995 – The Sega Saturn launch is unsuccessful. E3 is first held. 3dfx release the Voodoo GPU line. Key releases that year include Rayman, Ristar, Chrono Trigger and Time Crisis.
- 1996 – The Nintendo 64 launches; Atari leaves the market. Pokémon debuts and becomes a global phenomenon. Tomb Raider, Resident Evil, Super Mario 64, and Crash Bandicoot launch.
- 1997 – Final Fantasy VII, Star Fox 64, Castlevania: Symphony of the Night and GoldenEye 007. Modern games UX research is first employed for Crash Bandicoot 2: Cortex Strikes Back.
- 1998 – The Game Boy Color and Dreamcast launch. The Legend of Zelda: Ocarina of Time releases to critical acclaim. Half-Life is highly influential in immersive storytelling.
- 1999 – Nvidia enters the GPU market with the GeForce 256. Key titles that year include Super Smash Bros., Heroes of Might and Magic III, Ape Escape and Shenmue.

== 2000s ==
- 2000 – The PlayStation 2 launches and becomes the highest selling console of all time. Pokémon Gold & Silver releases internationally along with Dragon Quest VII, The Legend of Zelda: Majora's Mask and Kirby 64: The Crystal Shards.
- 2001 – Sega leaves the console market while Microsoft enters it with the Xbox. The GameCube and Game Boy Advance are also released. Pikmin, Halo, Animal Crossing, Conker's Bad Fur Day, Luigi's Mansion, Jak and Daxter, Devil May Cry, Ico and Phoenix Wright launch.
- 2002 – Grand Theft Auto: Vice City is successful and influences many open world games. Metroid Prime and The Legend of Zelda: The Wind Waker are critically acclaimed.
- 2003 – Steam launches and later dominates PC game sales. Pokémon Ruby & Sapphire, Mario Kart: Double Dash, Knights of the Old Republic and Call of Duty also see success.
- 2004 – The Nintendo DS is launched and World of Warcraft redefines MMORPGs. San Andreas, Cave Story (bringing in the age of indie gaming), Fable, Far Cry, Katamari Damacy, Half-Life 2 and Halo 2 all debut.
- 2005 – The Xbox 360 is released, along with God of War, Guild Wars and Shadow of the Colossus. Guitar Hero triggers a wave of musical rhythm games. E3 attendance peaks.
- 2006 – The Wii is released with Wii Sports and The Legend of Zelda: Twilight Princess. The PlayStation 3 launches. The Elder Scrolls IV is highly acclaimed.
- 2007 – Numerous high-profile releases including Halo 3, God of War II, Team Fortress 2, Assassin's Creed, BioShock, Crysis, Mass Effect, Portal, The Witcher, and Uncharted.
- 2008 – The Nintendo DSi launches. Key releases: Grand Theft Auto IV, Fallout 3, Metal Gear Solid 4, Fable II, Dead Space, Left 4 Dead, LittleBigPlanet, Mirror's Edge and Spore.
- 2009 – Minecraft launches and eventually becomes the best selling game of all time. Also that year are Angry Birds, Batman: Arkham Asylum, Dragon Age: Origins and Infamous.

== 2010s ==
- 2010 – The Kinect sells well but is later regarded as a gimmick. Red Dead Redemption, Assassin's Creed: Brotherhood, Mass Effect 2, God of War III are acclaimed.
- 2011 – Nintendo launches the 3DS. The Elder Scrolls V: Skyrim is considered among the greatest games of all time. Other key launches include Batman: Arkham City and Portal 2.
- 2012 – The PlayStation Vita and Wii U launch internationally and are both considered failures. Also launching are Far Cry 3, Journey, Dishonored, The Walking Dead and XCOM.
- 2013 – The PlayStation 4 and Xbox One launch, with the former becoming dominant. Outlast, The Wonderful 101, Gone Home and Remember Me are introduced. Grand Theft Auto V, The Last of Us, The Stanley Parable, Luigi's Mansion: Dark Moon and BioShock Infinite are warmly received.
- 2014 – Gamergate leads to changes in the industry's attitude to diversity. Key releases include Five Nights at Freddy's, Shovel Knight, Mario Kart 8, Hearthstone, Destiny and Monument Valley.
- 2015 – Twitch becomes influential in speedrunning and Lets Play. Launch of the New Nintendo 3DS, along with The Witcher 3: Wild Hunt, Bloodborne, Undertale and Fallout 4.
- 2016 – Interest in virtual reality technologies increase after the wider release of the Oculus Rift. Also released are Uncharted 4, Overwatch, Forza Horizon 3, and a rebooted Doom.
- 2017 – The Nintendo Switch launches with Breath of the Wild. Super Mario Odyssey is released. PlayerUnknown's Battlegrounds establishes the battle royale genre. Loot box proliferation leads to regulation debate.
- 2018 – Fortnite is a runaway success and the Epic Games Store launches. Also launching are Spider-Man, Red Dead Redemption 2, Super Smash Bros. Ultimate and God of War.
- 2019 – Launch of Google Stadia, Sekiro: Shadows Die Twice, Tetris Effect, Luigi's Mansion 3 and Disco Elysium. Some regulation of loot boxes begins in Belgium and the Netherlands.

== 2020s ==
- 2020 – The COVID-19 pandemic causes a global increase in gaming. Xbox Series X and PlayStation 5 launch; Animal Crossing: New Horizons and Among Us see high popularity.
- 2021 – A pandemic related chip shortage leads to supply issues of game hardware. Industry event cancellations continue, while Hades and Forza Horizon 5 see critical success.
- 2022 – Microsoft acquires Activision. The Steam Deck launch starts a wave of handheld gaming PCs such as the ROG Ally. Elden Ring, Horizon Forbidden West and Tunic launch.
- 2023 – Major layoffs due to pandemic-era overexpansion; Stadia and E3 are discontinued. Tears of the Kingdom, Baldur's Gate 3, Dave the Diver and Marvel's Spider-Man 2 launch.
- 2024 – Layoffs continue. Nintendo Network is discontinued. Willis Gibson becomes the first person to beat the Tetris killscreen. Palworld and Helldivers 2 are highly successful.
- 2025 – Release of Nintendo Switch 2. Layoffs continue. Clair Obscur: Expedition 33 launch.
- 2026 – Grand Theft Auto VI is launched

== See also ==
- Lists of years by topic
- List of years in games
