= 1987 in Macau =

Events from the year 1987 in Portuguese Macau.

== Incumbents ==
- Governor - Joaquim Pinto Correia, Carlos Melancia (1927–2022)

== Events ==
=== March ===
- 26 March - The Sino-Portuguese Joint Declaration was signed.

=== December ===
- 22 December - The Macau Olympic Committee is established.
