= 1991 in Macau =

Events from the year 1991 in Portuguese Macau.

== Incumbents ==
- President - Mário Soares
- Governor - Carlos Montez Melancia (until 23 April), Vasco Joaquim Rocha Vieira (starting 23 April)
