= 2014 in Jamaica =

- Decades: 1990s; 2000s; 2010s; 2020s
- See also: Other events of 2014; Timeline of Jamaican history

Events in the year 2014 in Jamaica.

== Incumbents ==
- Monarch: Elizabeth II
- Governor-General: Patrick Allen
- Prime Minister: Portia Simpson-Miller
- Chief Justice: Zaila McCalla

== Events ==
- 1 May – The first-ever outbreak of chikungunya in the Caribbean reaches epidemic levels.
- 25 September – A privately owned Socata TBM-900 (flight number N900KN) from the US flies without a conscious pilot for a thousand miles after a suspected cabin depressurization (see also) and crashes 14 miles off the coast of northeastern Jamaica.

== Sports ==
- 18 November – Jamaica win the 2014 Caribbean Cup defeating Trinidad and Tobago in the final following a penalty shootout.

== Deaths ==
- 2 February – Bunny Rugs, reggae musician (Third World) (b. 1948).
- 10 February – Stuart Hall, Jamaican-born British cultural theorist (b. 1932).
- 17 February – Wayne Smith, reggae musician ("Sleng Teng") (b. 1965).
- 25 February – Philip Smart, record producer (b. 1960).
- 9 April – Norman Girvan, professor and politician, Secretary General of the Association of Caribbean States (2000–2004) (b. 1941).
- 10 April – Eddy Thomas, dancer, choreographer and teacher, co-founder of National Dance Theatre Company (b. 1932).
- 11 April – Leonard Levy, cricketer (b. 1939).
- 19 May – Count Suckle, Jamaican-born British sound system operator and club owner (b. 1931).
- 24 May – E. Don Taylor, Anglican prelate, Bishop of the Virgin Islands (1986–1994), Vicar of New York City (1994–2009) (b. 1937).
- 11 July – Sir Howard Cooke, politician, Governor-General (1991–2006), MP (WIF) (1958–1962) and MP for St James (1962–1980), Senate President (1989–1993) (b. 1915).
- 27 July – G. Raymond Chang, Jamaican-born Canadian financial analyst, Chancellor of Ryerson University (2006–2012) (b. 1948).
- 9 August – Trevor Boots Harris, entertainment journalist and broadcaster (b. 1944/5).
- 22 August – Douglas Sang Hue, cricket umpire (b. 1931).
- 25 August – Uziah Thompson, percussionist (b. 1936).
- 28 August – Roger Clarke, politician, Minister of Agriculture (since 2012) (b. 1940).
- 31 August – Flip Fraser, Jamaican-British journalist and playwright (b. 1951).
- 4 September – Hopeton Lewis, singer (b. 1947).
- 20 September – Kamara James, Jamaican-born American Olympic fencer (2004) (b. 1984).
- 9 October – Style Scott, reggae drummer (b. 1956).
- 19 October – John Holt, singer (The Paragons) and songwriter ("The Tide Is High") (b. 1947).
- 19 December – Barbara Jones, reggae/gospel singer (b. c1952)
