= 2016 in Jamaica =

- Decades: 1990s; 2000s; 2010s; 2020s
- See also: Other events of 2016; Timeline of Jamaican history

Events in the year 2016 in Jamaica.

== Incumbents ==
- Monarch: Elizabeth II
- Governor-General: Patrick Allen
- Prime Minister: Portia Simpson-Miller (until 3 March); Andrew Holness
- Chief Justice: Zaila McCalla

== Events ==
- 30 January – Jamaican health officials confirm the country's first case of the Zika virus in a 4-year-old child who recently returned from a trip to Texas.
- 25 February – Jamaican general election, 2016:
  - Voters in Jamaica go to the polls for a general election, with the Jamaican Labour Party, led by Andrew Holness, winning a narrow victory.
- 1 May – Two missionaries from the United States are found slain in separate areas of rural St. Mary parish. Randy Hentzel and Harold Nichols both worked for a Pennsylvania-based Christian charity called Teams for Medical Missions.
- 30 September – Hurricane Matthew becomes a category-5 hurricane with maximum sustained winds up to 160 mph, the strongest hurricane to form over the Caribbean Sea since Hurricane Felix in 2007.
- 2 October – Heavy rains from Hurricane Matthew's outer bands drench Haiti and Jamaica, killing a Haitian fisherman.

=== Sports ===
- 14 August – 2016 Summer Olympics:
  - Athletics: Usain Bolt becomes the first man to win three gold medals in the men's 100 metres.

== Deaths ==
- 26 January – Barrington Watson, painter (b. 1931).
- 3 February – Mercedes Richards, astronomer and physicist (b. 1955).
- 27 February – Winston Blake, record producer (b. 1940).
- 23 March – Jimmy Riley, reggae musician (b. 1947)
- 28 March – Yvette Francis-McBarnette, Jamaican-born American pediatrician (b. 1926)
- 9 April – Derrick Rochester, politician and trade unionist, MP for South East St Elizabeth (1972–1980, 1989–2002), member of the Senate (1980–1983). (b. 1940)
- 19 April – Lord Tanamo, ska and mento musician (b. 1934).
- 6 June – Basil McKenzie, Olympic sprinter (b. 1926).
- 12 June – Michelle Cliff, Jamaican-born American writer (b. 1946)
- 17 June – Sam Beaver King, 90, Jamaican-born British political activist, Mayor of Southwark (1983), co-founder of the Notting Hill Carnival (b. 1926).
- 1 August – Louis Marriott, actor, director, writer and broadcaster (b. 1935).
- 3 August – Shakira Martin, 30, American-born Jamaican model and beauty queen, Miss Jamaica Universe (2011) (b. 1986).
- 21 August – Headley Bennett, saxophonist (b. 1931).
- 8 September – Prince Buster, ska musician ("One Step Beyond", "Al Capone") (b. 1938).
- 29 September – Nora Dean, singer (b. 1944).
- 18 October – Bobby Ellis, trumpeter (b. 1932).
- 16 November – Alex Stewart, Olympic boxer (1984) (b. 1964).
