= 2017 in Jamaica =

- Decades: 1990s; 2000s; 2010s; 2020s
- See also: Other events of 2017; Timeline of Jamaican history

Events in the year 2017 in Jamaica.

== Incumbents ==
- Monarch: Elizabeth II
- Governor-General: Patrick Allen
- Prime Minister: Andrew Holness
- Chief Justice: Zaila McCalla

== Events ==
=== Sports ===
- 4 to 13 August – Jamaica participated at the 2017 World Championships in Athletics, with 54 competitors in 24 events

== Deaths ==
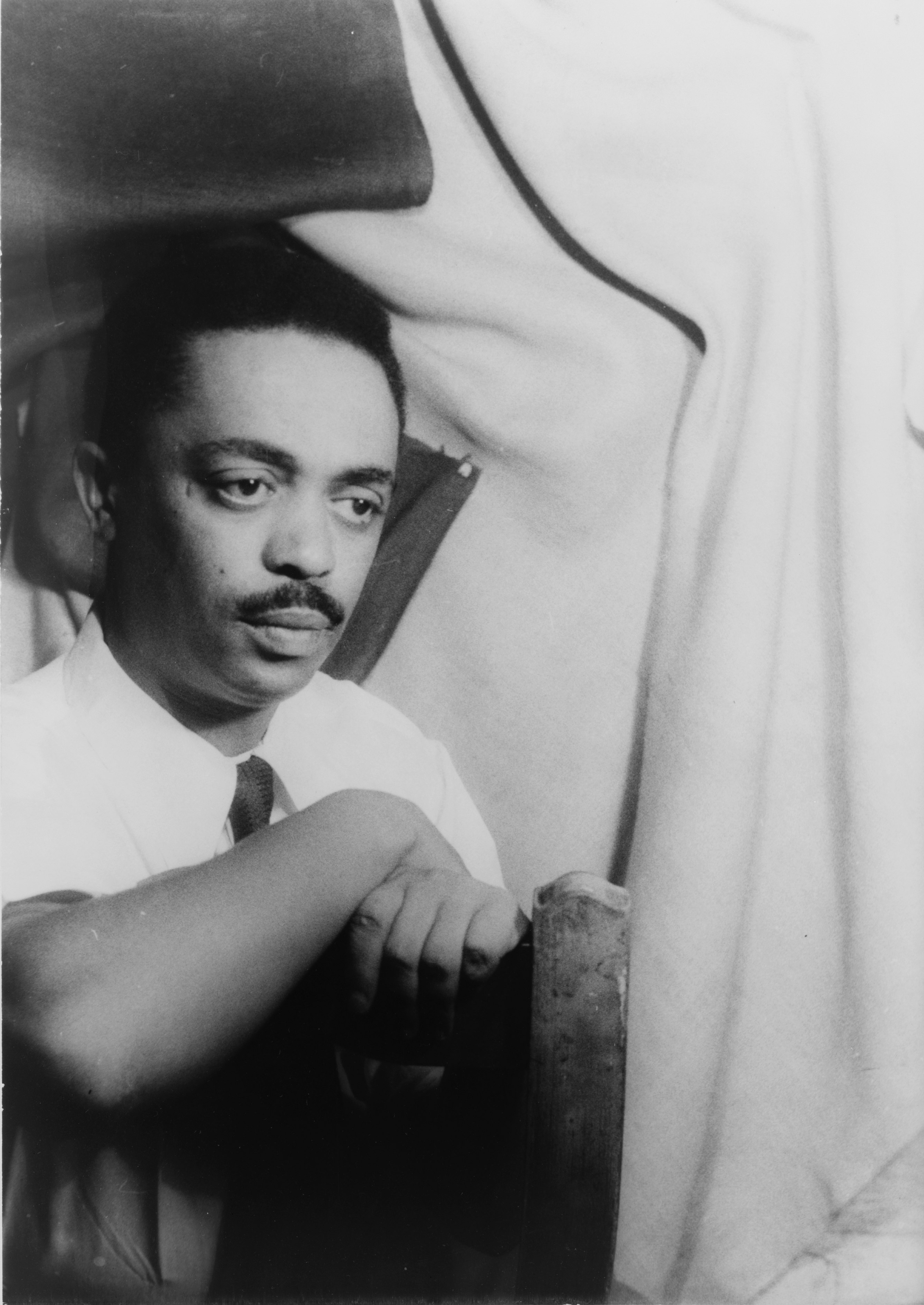
Peter Abrahams in 1955

- 18 January – Peter Abrahams, novelist, journalist and political commentator (b. 1919).
- 25 January – Ronnie Davis, reggae singer (b. 1950).
- 26 January – Lindy Delapenha, footballer and sports journalist (b. 1927).
- 6 June – Horace Burrell, football executive (b. 1950)
- 14 October – Marjorie Taylor, politician.
