= Cultural impact of the Guitar Hero series =

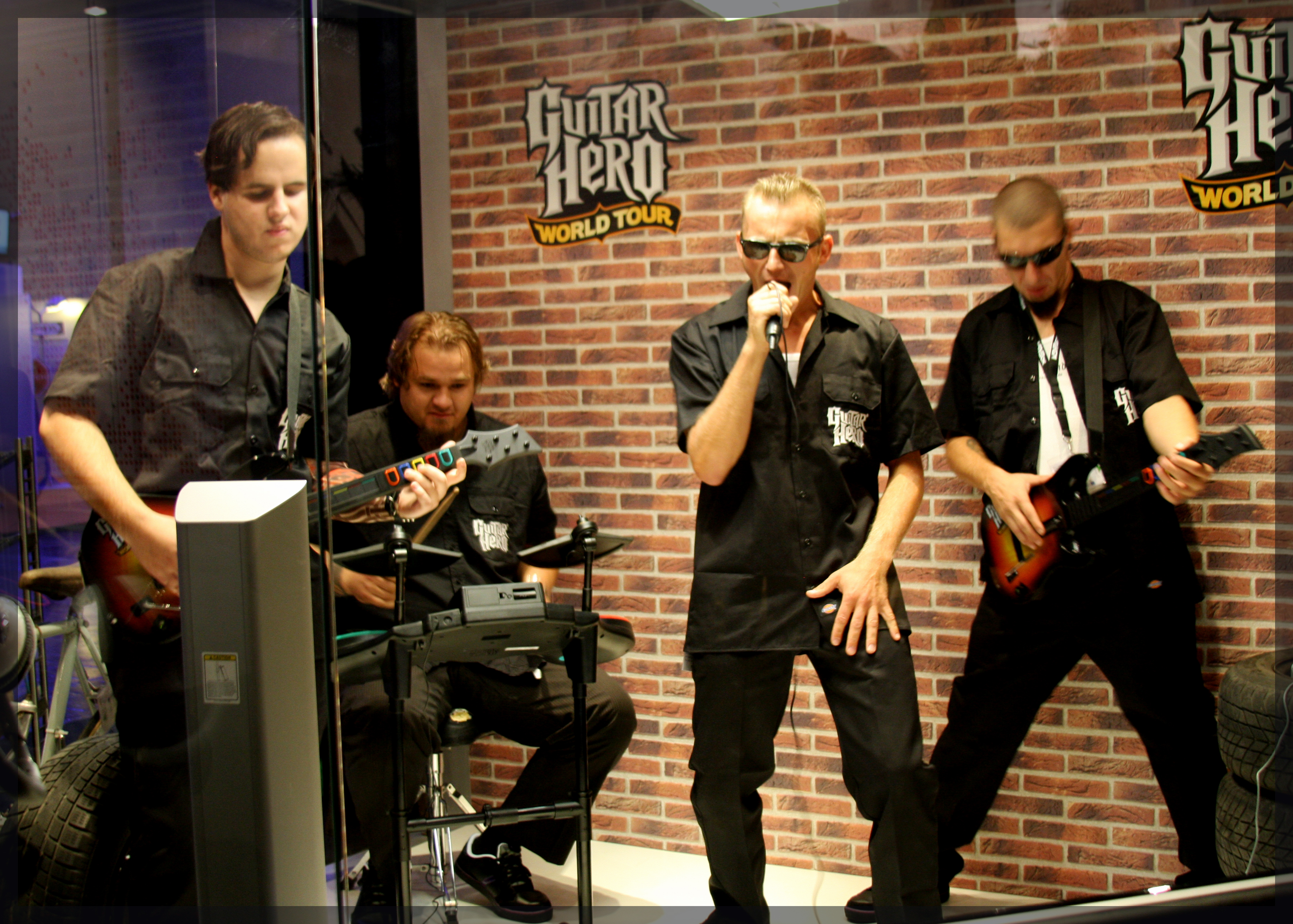
Guitar Hero, which has expanded to include drums and vocals in addition to lead and bass guitar, has become a popular activity and has had a significant impact across several different industries.

Guitar Hero is a series of rhythm video games published by Activision in which players use guitar-shaped controllers to mimic the playing of numerous rock music songs in a score attack gameplay; later games in the series have included support for drums and vocals and playing as a full band. With over $2 billion in total sales worldwide, the game series has made a significant cultural impact (especially during the series peak in popularity and relevance in the late 2000's to early 2010's), becoming a cultural phenomenon and recognizable in the popular culture. The series has been found to influence younger players into learning real instruments and has found application within the health care industry to help recovering patients.

Both Guitar Hero and Rock Band (a similar series of games developed by Harmonix, who originally developed Guitar Hero), have altered the video game and music industries. For video games, the introduction of Guitar Hero has led rhythm games to become one of the industries' largest growing markets. The series has also sparked the creation of both commercial and independently developed games with similar gameplay mechanics as well as learning tools using a real guitar in place of the controller. Older artists featured in Guitar Hero and Rock Band have experienced a surge in the popularity of their music, and the games have been seen as a way for younger audiences to experience the classic rock songs featured in the games. Newer bands and unsigned artists have also found success by being included in the game. This has led several bands to seek placement of their songs within the games. The impact of Guitar Hero on the music industry has caused music publishers to re-evaluate their approach to music licensing and their relationship with the video game industry.

== In entertainment ==
The series' titles became popular party games, which led them to be played in a variety of locales. In the wake of the series popularity several bars in the United States and Canada began offering "Guitar Hero nights" as an alternative to karaoke; one New York City bar experienced triple the business on such nights. Many concert tours, including the Family Values Tour feature Guitar Hero booths and contests between sets. Guitar Hero is responsible for introducing people to rock music and inspiring them to learn how to play guitar. A study by Youth Music found that 2.5 million out of 12 million children in the United Kingdom have begun learning how to play real instruments after playing music video games such as Guitar Hero; the group believes that these video games can be incorporated into music educational programs. Activision has teamed with the United Service Organizations to provide monetary support and copies of Guitar Hero III to the United States Armed Forces around the world.

== In health and treatment ==
Guitar Hero has proven to be a useful tool in the development of children and as recovery for various injuries. Salon.com states that the games helped an 8-year-old guitarist learn sensitivity to rhythm, as well as develop the dexterity and independent hand usage necessary to play the instrument. Guitar Hero has been used alongside physical therapy to help recovering stroke patients as the games help with multiple limb coordination between fretting and strumming. Blondie drummer Clem Burke has worked with researchers at the University of Chichester and the University of Gloucestershire to determine how games like Guitar Hero can address issues of "child and adult obesity, autism, stroke patients and health and mental well-being in the workplace". Researchers at Johns Hopkins University have used Guitar Hero III and its controller to help amputee patients and to develop new prosthetic limbs for these patients. Researchers at Nevada Reno University have been able to modify a haptic feedback glove to work with the Guitar Hero freeware clone, Frets on Fire, to create Blind Hero, a music game that works on touch and audio to appeal the game to visually impaired players. Guitar Hero was used as part of a Trent University youth sleep study which showed that players generally were better at replaying a song they had just been introduced to twelve hours later if that period included normal sleep.

== On the video game industry ==
Activision stated on January 21, 2008, that North American sales from all of the Guitar Hero franchise have exceeded one billion dollars with over 16 million units sold, excluding downloadable content. Over 20 million songs have been sold as downloadable content as of July 2008, and 34 million by May 2009. As of October 9, 2008, the series has sold 23 million units with sales of US$1.6 billion, and as of May 2009 has earned US$2 billion at retail. Activision claims that Guitar Hero is the third largest video game franchise after the Mario and Madden NFL series, and is present in over 15 million households. Guitar Hero: World Tour along with other music games such as Rock Band 2 have surged the video game market in 2008; NPD Group reports cited that music video games made up 19% of the overall software industry sales in July 2008, and 16% through November 2008, and contributing to a 32% year-to-date sector growth through July 2008. Total sales of music games doubled in 2008, with total sales of US$1.9 billion. Guitar Hero represented about half of that figure, with a total of $992M of retail sales in 2008, and was the highest selling brand of the year. At the 2009 Consumer Electronics Show, Activision CEO Mike Griffith stated that Guitar Hero III is the first video game to exceed one billion dollars in total sales. Activision reported that the Guitar Hero franchise had 55% of the United States and European markets during the first quarter of 2009. Analysts expect 2009 to be a critical year to determine the future direction of music games, whether the sector will continue to grow or will remain stagnant. Early analysis of the first half of 2009 showed that sales of both Guitar Hero and Rock Band franchise games were down by half from the same period in 2008, likely due to fewer purchases of the more expensive game bundles that include one or more controllers, as well as large discounts on the prices of older games. Viacom, parent company of MTV Games, reported a 32% drop in 2009 second quarter profits, partially driven by weak sales of Rock Band amid the poor economy of the period.

The series has created a market for products outside of the video games. McFarlane Toys has developed a series of six-inch-tall figurines based on the characters from the game. Brett Ratner, director for Rush Hour and X-Men: The Last Stand, has stated that he wishes to bring a movie based on Guitar Hero to theaters. However, Activision, the publisher of the series, did not approve the idea of a film adaptation.

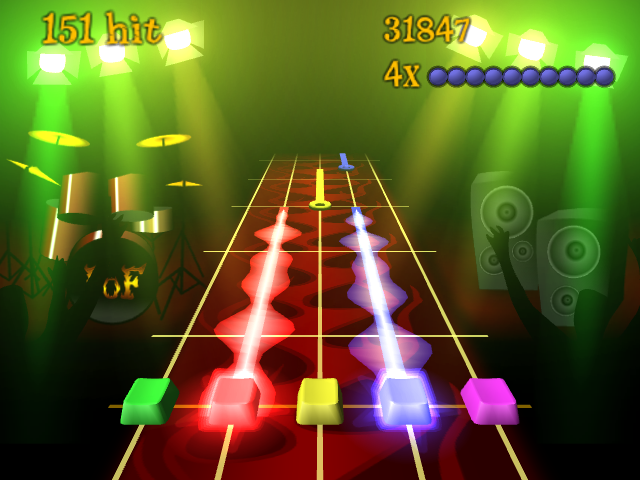
Frets on Fire is one of the many clones based on the success of the Guitar Hero series.

The popularity of the Guitar Hero series has led to the development of several commercial and independent clones. Besides Harmonix' Rock Band series, Konami released Rock Revolution in 2008 which features drums and guitar (the game does not include vocals) similar to Guitar Hero World Tour. PopStar Guitar for the PlayStation 2 and Wii systems, developed by XS Games, features gameplay similar to the Guitar Hero series, but features pop music, as opposed to rock and metal. Digital Praise released a Christian rock-themed guitar-based game called Guitar Praise also in 2008. Guitar Rising, published for personal computers by Game Tank by 2009, is based on using a real guitar in order to perfect one's skills. We Rock: Drum King is a game promoted by Rolling Stone for the Wii that uses two Wii remotes as virtual drumsticks. Frets on Fire is an open-source clone of Guitar Hero for personal computers that features freely available independent songs and allows users to create their own note tracks, Clone Hero features the same aspects of freedom of song choice and community-made note tracks, but aims to almost exactly recreate Guitar Hero, rather than imitate it. Other games based on Guitar Hero include Battle of the Bands and Ultimate Band. Guitar Hero has also influenced other games outside of the music game genre. Tim Schafer credits Harmonix and the first Guitar Hero game to help establish his pitching of his heavy metal-inspired game, Brütal Legend, due to the increase in popularity of metal music from the success of Guitar Hero. Guitar controllers have been repurposed as controls for an independently developed platform game, Fret Nice. Rock of the Dead for the Wii is based on combining the aspects of The Typing of the Dead with using a Guitar Hero guitar controller to fend off zombies. A PlayStation Home themed space based on Guitar Hero, called "Guitar Hero: Backstage", was released on March 26, 2009, in North Americas version, and includes a "Simon says"-like minigame called "Guitar Hero-Master of Rock", themed objects, and videos for the user.

Guitar Hero has also been considered to have made the use of special peripherals more commonplace and acceptable for consumers for games that followed, including Nintendo's Wii console and games such as Mario Kart Wii and Wii Fit.

Fan sites have also arisen to provide news and forums related to the Guitar Hero series. Scorehero is one such site that includes both forums and informal tracking of players' scores for both the Guitar Hero and Rock Band series; the site has received donations from Harmonix president Alex Rigopulos, and site members have been invited to pre-release demonstrations of upcoming games, often leading to information about tracks in these games.

Guitar Hero now holds a place in the Guinness World Records in their Gamer's Edition, tracking the highest score on a single song (Dragonforce's "Through the Fire and Flames") in Guitar Hero III; the record has held by both Chris Chike and Daniel Johnson, each outdoing each other in subsequent attempts; Johnson is the present holder of the record. Chike has received additional notice for performing a full combo playthrough of Dragonforce's "Through the Fire and Flames". Both players' reputations have earned them spokespersons deals, Chike for The Ant Commandos, a third-party peripheral controller maker, and Johnson for eMazingGaming.com, a video game event promoter. Guinness also awarded the series ten world records in the Gamer's Edition 2008, including "Best Selling Guitar Based Game" and "Biggest Funeral for a Fictional Object", when in November 2006 a funeral for the air guitar was held in London, England as a publicity stunt for Guitar Hero II's release.

== On the music industry ==
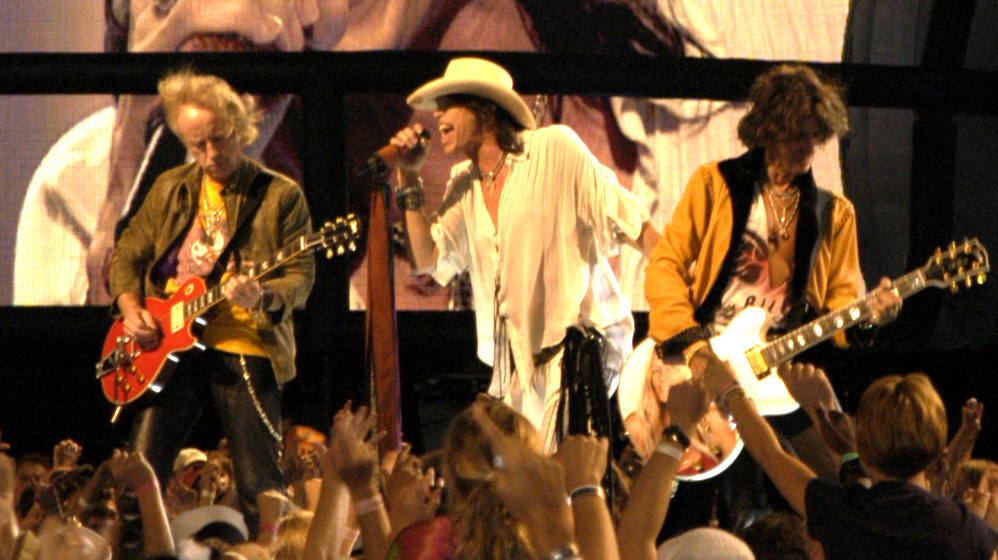
The band Aerosmith has made more money from Guitar Hero: Aerosmith than from sales of any single album.

Guitar Hero and Rock Band have been considered a boon to the music industry in a manner similar to music videos in the 1980s. Both licensed and indie bands whose works have been included in the Guitar Hero games have gained further popularity from this inclusion. Both record companies and retailers have experienced increases of 200% to 300% in sales of songs after their inclusion in the series. Every Guitar Hero III song tracked by Nielsen SoundScan (62 of 70) saw an increase in digital download sales the week ending December 30, 2007, when many who got the game as a gift were playing it, and every song included in Guitar Hero III and Rock Band saw downloaded sales increase during 2007 between 15% and 843%. A survey conducted by Brown University's Kiri Miller found that 76% of the players of Guitar Hero bought the music they heard in the game. Indie group Bang Camaro's recognition increased after their song "Push Push (Lady Lightning)" appeared in Guitar Hero II. The band DragonForce, whose song "Through the Fire and Flames" is featured as a bonus song in Guitar Hero III: Legends of Rock, saw a 126% increase in CD sales in the week after the release of the game, and downloads of the song, selling fewer than 2,000 weekly, rose to more than 10,000 after Guitar Hero III's release and approached 40,000 the week ending 2007-12-30. Even older, established groups such as Aerosmith saw an increase in sales at the same time Guitar Hero games containing their songs were released, such as a modest increase in download sales for its "Same Old Song and Dance", which rose to 2,041 from 374 copies the previous week; a 40% increase in the band's catalog was seen in the weeks following the release of Guitar Hero: Aerosmith. According to Activision CEO Bobby Kotick, Guitar Hero: Aerosmith has made more money for Aerosmith than any of their previous albums. Both Guitar Hero and Rock Band are seen as new methods of music distribution; an analysis for market research company NPD Group states that "As the video games industry grows, it's becoming an ever-more attractive promotional outlet for all kinds of industries." The games have also been seen as a way to introduce younger generations to music of the past; bands such as Living Colour, Warrant, the Grateful Dead, Poison, and Ratt have seen interest in their music rise due to the inclusion of their songs in the Guitar Hero or Rock Band, as well as other music video games. Joel Peresman, president and CEO of the Rock and Roll Hall of Fame, attributes surges in attendance to the museum in 2008–2009, particularly in families with young children, in part to the success of Guitar Hero and Rock Band. The popularity of downloadable content for music games has led the UK Official Download Chart to consider including these sales in their compilation of sales performance data.

Bands or those that control the copyrights on bands' works have been in talks with the makers and distributions of both Guitar Hero and Rock Band as methods of achieving more exposure for the band. Following the announcement of Guitar Hero: Aerosmith, Martin Bandier, executive for Sony/ATV which owns the copyrights on Beatles compositions, stated he was very interested in helping Activision bring a Beatles-themed Guitar Hero title to the market in a similar fashion. Both Activision and MTV Games were in talks with representatives of the Beatles to create a Beatles-themed game, until MTV Games secured an exclusive license with Apple Corps to produce The Beatles: Rock Band. Groups such as Van Halen, the Eagles, Steely Dan and Guns N' Roses had working deals with these companies to include their songs within future games. Other artists, having played Guitar Hero or Rock Band, may approach the game developers to ask for inclusion of songs specifically for their adaptability into playable tracks. However, not all bands were comfortable with this: Led Zeppelin had turned down offers from both games to include their music due to concerns that Jimmy Page and other members of the band have with releasing the master recordings of their music. There were also cases where bands wanted to be included, but the master recordings have been lost or are unusable. Some bands such as the Sex Pistols, Living Colour, and Aerosmith have rerecorded these songs, while other bands have been able to provide concert "live" master recordings. However, some larger artists are unable to do so. Neversoft director Brian Bright states that they do not expect to acquire songs from Pink Floyd and Prince due to such reasons. With the pending release of The Beatles: Rock Band, Pink Floyd was also in active discussions to include its music in either Guitar Hero or Rock Band, according to representatives for EMI.

Guitar Hero and other rock music-based games work with record companies to license each song for its use, costing a per-song average of $25,000 for the rights to use a master recording and $10,000 for the rights to make a cover. The impact of Guitar Hero and Rock Band has caused record companies to create dedicated video game liaisons to handle the inclusions of songs in these games. The record and game companies work together to tie in releases of downloadable content with album releases and concert appearances, such as by the simultaneous release of Metallica's Death Magnetic album and as playable Guitar Hero tracks. However, some in the music industry have raised concerns that the music labels are not receiving fair compensation considering the success of the games. Edgar Bronfman Jr., chairman and chief executive for Warner Music Group, stated that "The amount being paid to the industry, even though their games are entirely dependent on the content that we own and control, is far too small." Tim Riley, vice president of music affairs at Activision, believes that the increase in popularity of the game series has led more people, including musicians and music labels, to want to be part of the success: "The number of people interested in being associated with the game is probably a thousand times more than we can get into the game." Kotick has stated, in response to the record company's claims, that the impact that the Guitar Hero games have caused game developers and publishers to question if they "should be paying any money at all and whether it should be the reverse." Mötley Crüe manager Allen Kovac noted that artists make a larger share of the sale of each downloaded game song compared to iTunes, and that bands that own their own master recordings earn even a larger percentage from music licensing rights. Michael Pachter, an industry analyst for Wedbush Morgan, noted that Guitar Hero is not dependent on a single record label, as there is nearly a 2000-year supply of songs available at the current rate of content releases, and a full music industry denial to the game series could lead to anti-trust measures. Patcher also contrasted Bronfman's view, stating that users are not buying the games for the songs, but for the game, with each song providing its own challenge. However, analysis believe that Activision's attitude on music licensing may have influenced the decision of Apple Corps to give the lucrative licensing agreement for the Beatles' music to MTV Games, who were more flexible in their negotiations.

Some musicians have been critical of Guitar Hero's impact on the industry. Jack White of the White Stripes stated that he was disappointed to learn that video games are the most likely venue where younger audiences will be exposed to new works, while Jimmy Page does not believe that people can learn how to play real instruments from their video game counterparts. Similarly, Prince has turned down opportunities to have his music in the series, stating that he felt that it was "more important that kids learn how to actually play the guitar".

== In popular culture ==
Guitar Hero has made several appearances in popular culture. Guitar Hero II is the centerpiece of an episode of South Park titled "Guitar Queer-O", in which Stan and Kyle overindulge in Guitar Hero II and become treated as though they were real-life rock stars. The episode was first broadcast on November 7, 2007, ten days after the American release of Guitar Hero III: Legends of Rock. Metalocalypse (created by Titmouse Studio, who also provided cutscene animations within the Guitar Hero game) has made reference to Guitar Hero; in one example, the episode "Dethkids," a sick child composes a song for Dethklok rhythm guitarist Toki Wartooth using a Guitar Hero controller. Ellen DeGeneres has played Guitar Hero several times in 2008 during the monologue of her syndicated talk show. In the January 25, 2008, episode she is seen playing along to "Barracuda", which segues to Heart performing the song for the audience. During the season 7 finale of American Idol, finalists David Cook and David Archuleta appeared in separate commercials for the games, where they each parodied Tom Cruise dancing to "Old Time Rock and Roll" in the movie Risky Business. This parody has been used by director Brett Ratner to create advertisements for Guitar Hero World Tour, featuring celebrities such as Kobe Bryant, Tony Hawk, Alex Rodriguez, Michael Phelps, Corbin Bleu, Heidi Klum, and Marisa Miller.

Political cartoonist Steve Breen illustrated a cartoon where Queen Elizabeth II received Guitar Hero as a gift from visiting President Barack Obama, a parody of Obama's visit to England in April 2009 during which he gave Queen Elizabeth II an iPod. During Halftime of MLS Cup 2009 two league players, Jimmy Conrad of the Kansas City Wizards and Freddy Montero of Seattle Sounders FC faced off to Michael Jackson's "Beat It" in Guitar Hero World Tour. A scene, written into the script by Vince Vaughn, in Couples Retreat features Vaughn's character challenging a resort employee to a Guitar Hero 5-faceoff.

MC Lars' This Gigantic Robot Kills includes a song called "Guitar Hero Hero (Beating Guitar Hero Does Not Make You Slash)", poking fun at frequent players of GH. It features a solo from Paul Gilbert. (The song's lyrics reference the following real-guitar players in addition to those two: Robert Johnson, Dimebag Darrell, Eric Clapton and Jimi Hendrix.) Mariah Carey's music video for her song "Touch My Body" features a nerd strumming on a Guitar Hero controller. The music video for San Diego rock band Switchfoot's song "Awakening" featured two men going home and competing separately on Guitar Hero, using stop-motion cardboard cutouts to simulate the video game interface. The music video for Eminem's "We Made You" includes portions of the song where Eminem is singing in front of a Guitar Hero-like note highway. The video for Brad Paisley's "Start a Band", featuring Keith Urban, includes a Guitar Hero-like "Guitar Showdown" video game as part of the video's story.

The series' popularity spread to the sports world; Detroit Tigers' pitcher Joel Zumaya injured himself during the 2006 playoffs playing Guitar Hero. In professional wrestling, former TNA Wrestling tag team of Jimmy Rave and Lance Rock, known as the Rock 'n' Rave Infection, have a gimmick of dressing as characters from the game and strumming the guitar controllers on their way to the ring.

The name "Guitar Hero" is often juxtapositioned with other instruments or other tools for humorous effects. There are T-shirts available from at least one vendor, parodying the Guitar Hero logo with a number of different instruments, from violin to bagpipes. Marketing for The Simpsons Game included mock posters for "Sitar Hero", depicting The Simpsons character Apu with a controller with 21 buttons and a small list of songs parodying real-world songs, such as "Pour Some Curry on Me" (a parody of Def Leppard's "Pour Some Sugar on Me") and "Shankar Groove Thing" (a parody of Peaches & Herb's "Shake Your Groove Thing"), a parody Harmonix praised. GameSpot released an April Fools' article in 2006 announcing "Cowbell Hero" as a successor to the first game, referencing the "More cowbell" skit from Saturday Night Live. Also, a "Cowbell Hero" T-shirt appears among Chuck's collection of shirts in an episode of the NBC series, Chuck. One Penny Arcade comic strip envisioned a game entitled "Photoshop Hero", which has become a design for one of their T-shirts. A 2008 FoxTrot Sunday comic showed the characters Jason and Marcus playing a video game called "Chamber Music Hero." The satirical newspaper The Onion published an article entitled "Activision Reports Sluggish Sales For Sousaphone Hero." In the 15th episode of the first season of the Adult Swim cartoon Metalocalypse, a young girl played a song for Dethklok member Toki Wartooth with a Guitar Hero controller. Later, in the 3rd episode of the second season, one Dethklok fan is seen with a Guitar Hero controller in his room whilst illegally downloading Dethklok MP3s.

In March 2010, the Office For National Statistics (UK) announced that Guitar Hero will be used to gauge the country's inflation risk. Viacom Inc.'s Rock Band was also included to reflect changes in (UK) consumer spending. In 2009 a Guitar Hero reality show and a concert tour were considered but never materialized.
