= List of years in games =

This page indexes lists of games (board and card games, wargames, miniatures games, and tabletop role-playing games) by their years of release. For video games, see List of years in video games.

== 1970s ==
This decade saw the board wargame gain popularity. It also saw the appearance of the earliest, simple video games, and the role-playing game Dungeons & Dragons.

- 1970 in games
- 1971 in games
- 1972 in games
- 1973 in games
- 1974 in games
- 1975 in games
- 1976 in games
- 1977 in games
- 1978 in games
- 1979 in games

== 1980s ==
- 1980 in games
- 1981 in games
- 1982 in games
- 1983 in games
- 1984 in games
- 1985 in games
- 1986 in games
- 1987 in games
- 1988 in games
- 1989 in games

== 1990s ==
Major shake-ups occur in the major players of US game publishing and distribution. Wizards of the Coast, which started the decade as a small West Coast publisher, buys veteran Avalon Hill later in the decade, only to be bought up in turn by industry juggernaut Hasbro. TSR and Iron Crown Enterprises both collapse.

The collectible card game (CCG) became a dominant business model, first by Magic: The Gathering then by several rivals. By the mid-nineties, hundreds of CCGs competed for market share, with most failing due to weak sales. Collectible gaming also expanded from cards into dice, tiles, and miniatures.

The Settlers of Catan is credited with introducing Eurogames to the North American market, achieving rapid commercial success and establishing itself as a prominent "gateway game" becoming an overnight bestseller and gateway game. In response to the growing demand, publishers such as Mayfair Games and Rio Grande Games began localizing and distributing European game titles for the region.

Online retailing begins to pose a challenge to "brick and mortar" game stores, though the full effects of e-commerce will not be felt until the following decade.

- 1990 in games
- 1991 in games
- 1992 in games
- 1993 in games
- 1994 in games
- 1995 in games
- 1996 in games
- 1997 in games
- 1998 in games
- 1999 in games

== 2000s ==
The internet continues to shake up the publishing and distribution of games. Online retailing becomes a serious threat to "brick and mortar" retailers. Desktop publishing proves to be a boon for hobby game designers, and the door is opened for many small publishers producing their own game designs. Z-Man Games and Fantasy Flight Games become major players in the US hobby game industry. Miniatures games dominate the collectible games market.

- 2000 in games
- 2001 in games
- 2002 in games
- 2003 in games
- 2004 in games
- 2005 in games
- 2006 in games
- 2007 in games
- 2008 in games
- 2009 in games

== 2010s ==
- 2010 in games
- 2011 in games
- 2012 in games
- 2013 in games
- 2014 in games
- 2015 in games
- 2016 in games
- 2017 in games
- 2018 in games
- 2019 in games

== 2020s ==
- 2020 in games
- 2021 in games
- 2022 in games
- 2023 in games
- 2024 in games
- 2025 in games
