= 2019 in Jamaica =

- Decades: 1990s; 2000s; 2010s; 2020s
- See also: Other events of 2019; Timeline of Jamaican history

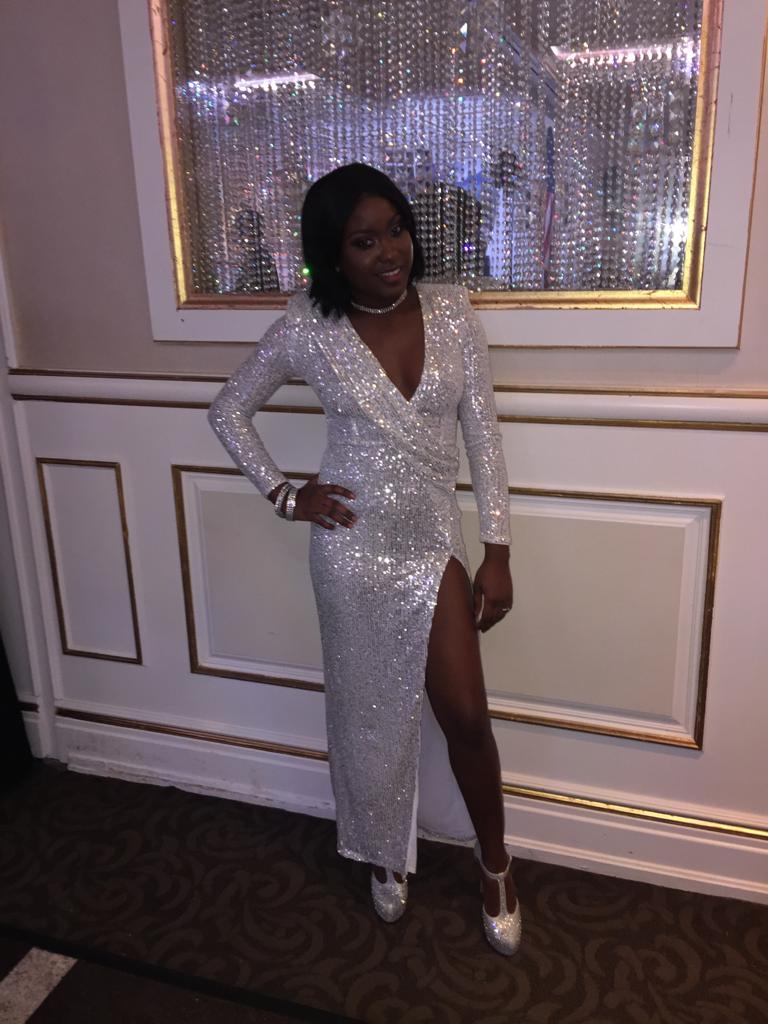
2019 fundraising gala

Events in the year 2019 in Jamaica.

== Incumbents ==
- Monarch: Elizabeth II
- Governor-General: Patrick Allen
- Prime Minister: Andrew Holness
- Chief Justice: Zaila McCalla

== Events ==
=== Politics ===
- April 4 – 2019 Portland Eastern by-election

=== Sports ===
- 26 July to 11 August – Jamaica competed in the 2019 Pan American Games in Lima, Peru

== Deaths ==
- 2 February –Lynvale Bloomfield (b. 1959).
- 11 February – Delroy Poyser, long jumper (b. 1962).
- 8 March – Cynthia Thompson, Olympic sprinter (b. 1922).
