= 1994 in Macau =

Events from the year 1994 in Portuguese Macau.

== Incumbents ==
- President - Mário Soares
- Governor - Vasco Joaquim Rocha Vieira
