= 1996 in Macau =

Events from the year 1996 in Portuguese Macau.

== Incumbents ==
- Governor - Vasco Joaquim Rocha Vieira

== Events ==
=== October ===
- 23 October - The inauguration of the Museum of Sacred Art and Crypt in Santo António.
