= 1993 in Macau =

Events from the year 1993 in Portuguese Macau.

== Incumbents ==
- President - Mário Soares
- Governor - Vasco Joaquim Rocha Vieira

== Events ==
- 18 November - The inauguration of Grand Prix Museum in Sé.
