= 1990 in Macau =

Events from the year 1990 in Portuguese Macau.

== Incumbents ==
- Governor – Carlos Montez Melancia

== Events ==
- 24 June – The opening of the new building of Maritime Museum in São Lourenço.

== Births ==
- 18 March – Wang Kuong Leong, athlete
