= 1995 in Macau =

Events from the year 1995 in Portuguese Macau.

== Incumbents ==
- President - Mário Soares
- Governor - Vasco Joaquim Rocha Vieira

== Events ==
=== November ===
- 9 November - The opening of Macau International Airport in Taipa.

=== December ===
- 25 December - The inauguration of Macau Wine Museum in Sé.
