= 1992 in Macau =

Events from the year 1992 in Portuguese Macau.

== Incumbents ==
- President - Mário Soares
- Governor - Vasco Joaquim Rocha Vieira
