= 1970 in video games =

At the beginning of the 1970s, video games existed almost entirely as novelties passed around by programmers with access to computers, primarily those housed at research institutions and large companies. 1970 marked a crucial year in the transition of electronic games from academic circles to the mainstream public, with developments in chess artificial intelligence and the concept of commercialized video games which would come to fruition in the following years.

While the technology that later became the Odyssey was stalled in development, the game which would become Computer Space began development. In computer games, multiple games written in the BASIC programming language by high school and college students circulated among different computer networks via time-sharing and computer user’s societies. Some of these programs were later distributed as type-in listings via books and magazines. The first national competition of chess programs was held in the United States, drawing attention to advances in artificial intelligence development through the medium of games.

== Events ==
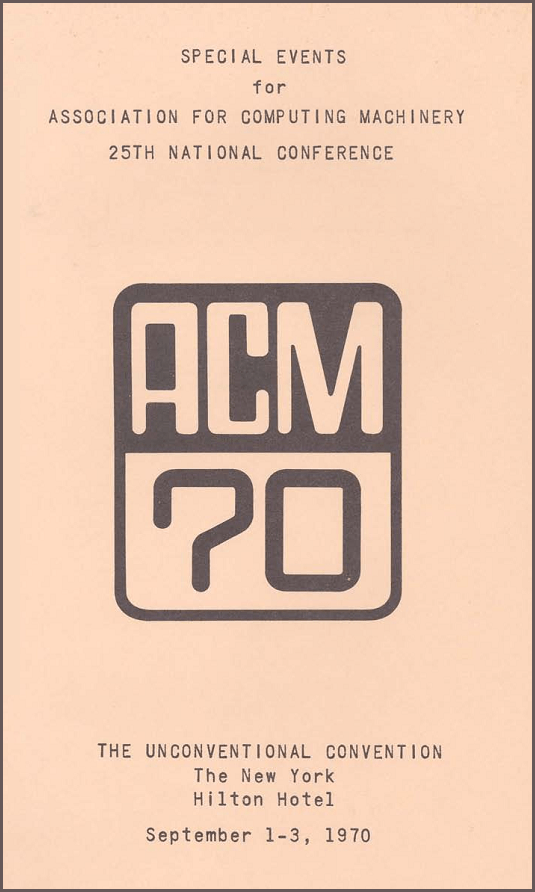
The special events for ACM 1970 included the first computer chess championship.

- April – Georgy Adelson-Velsky, Arlazov, Bitman, Zhivotovskii and Uskov publish their paper Programming a computer to play chess in Russian Mathematical Surveys. In addition to discussion of the mathematical problems involved, the paper includes examples of humans playing against the computer, presented using chess notation.
- Summer – Nolan Bushnell and Ted Dabney begin work on an adaptation of the Spacewar! mainframe game. Originally the game is intended to run off a Data General Nova 1200 computer with support hardware. This would eventually lead to the development of Computer Space (1971) using a custom transistor-transistor logic design.
- September 1–3 – The first U.S. Computer Chess Championship is held by the Association for Computing Machinery. The contestants play via telephone, using moves generated by mainframe computers located at various universities. The victor is the Chess 3.0 program running off of a CDC 6400 - created by David Slate, Keith Gorlen, and Larry Atkin of Northwestern University. The other competitors are The Daly CP (Chris Daly & Kenneth King), J. Biit (Columbia University), COKO III (University of California & Bell Telephone Laboratories), SCHACH (Texas A&M University) and Marsland CP (Tony Marsland).
- December 24 – A computer racing game programmed in CALL/360:BASIC for the IBM System/360 is played on a Christmas Eve special of BBC's Tomorrow’s World. Commentator Raymond Baxter and racing driver Graham Hill play the game while coordinators Anne Norie and Margaret Watson operate the terminals.

== Notable releases ==
=== Publications ===
- The newsletter EDU is first published by Digital Equipment Corporation. Edited by David Ahl, the newsletter became one of the first commercial outlets of game type-in listings. Ahl later publishes 101 BASIC Computer Games based, in part, on listings he collected for publication in EDU.

=== Games ===
==== Computer ====
- September 12 – Christopher Gaylo, a student at Syosset High School in Syosset, New York, completes a finalized version of the BASIC game Highnoon. It was distributed on the Huntington Project time-sharing network. The code was later posted by Gaylo online.

== Business ==
- April 3 – Gremlin Industries is founded in San Diego, California as a contract manufacturer of electronics. The company enters coin-operated games in 1972 and in 1978 is purchased by Sega Enterprises Inc.
- October - Game operator Nihon Bussan is established in Japan. They later release games under the trade name Nichibutsu.

== See also ==
- Early history of video games
- 1970 in games
