= 2018 in Jamaica =

- Decades: 1990s; 2000s; 2010s; 2020s
- See also: Other events of 2018; Timeline of Jamaican history

Events in the year 2018 in Jamaica.

== Incumbents ==
- Monarch: Elizabeth II
- Governor-General: Patrick Allen
- Prime Minister: Andrew Holness
- Chief Justice: Zaila McCalla

== Events ==
=== Sports ===
- 9 to 25 February – Jamaica participated at the 2018 Winter Olympics in PyeongChang, South Korea, with 3 competitors in 2 sports, bobsleigh and skeleton

== Deaths ==
- 5 March – Dorothy Henriques-Wells, 92, artist
- 15 March – Gene Pearson, 71, ceramic artist.
- 7 July – Garry Lowe, musician (b. 1976).
- 31 July – Irvin Jarrett, reggae percussionist (Inner Circle, Third World).
