= 2022 in Nauru =

- Decades: 2000s; 2010s; 2020s
- See also: Other events of 2022; Timeline of Nauruan history

The following lists events that happened during 2022 in the Republic of Nauru.

== Incumbents ==
Image	Name	Position	Term
	Lionel Aingimea	President	27 August 2019 – 28 September 2022
	Russ Kun	President	28 September 2022–Incumbent
	Martin Hunt	Deputy	27 September 2022–Incumbent
	Marcus Stephen	Speaker of the Parliament	27 August 2019–Incumbent

== Events ==
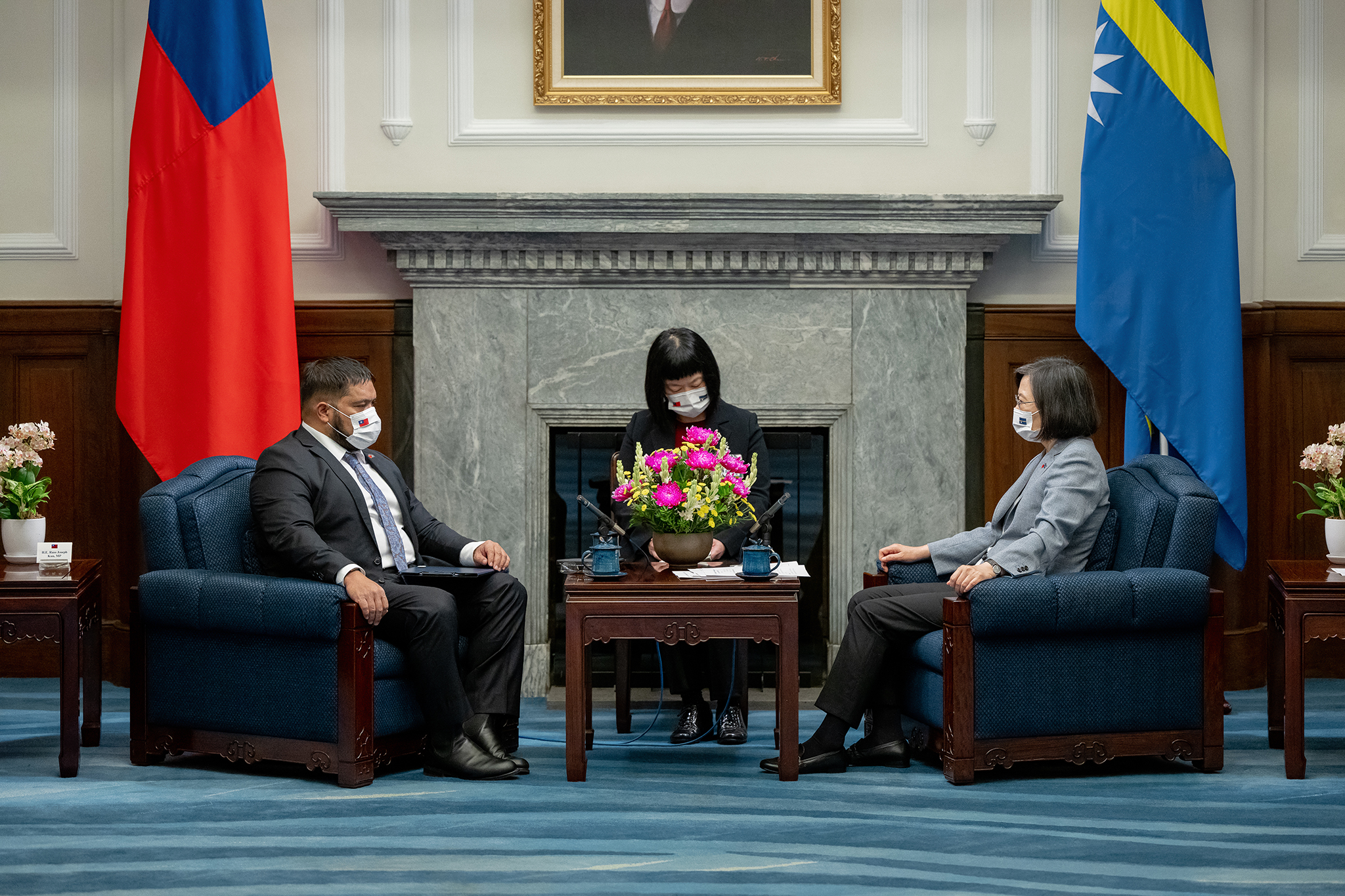
President Russ Kun meeting with Taiwanese President Tsai Ing-wen.

Ongoing – COVID-19 pandemic in Nauru

- 1 March – Australian Prime Minister Scott Morrison tests positive for COVID-19 hours after meeting with President Aingimea.
- 24 March – New Zealand announces it will take in 450 asylum seekers from Australia or its offshore detention centre in Nauru.
- 2 April – Nauru announces its first two cases of COVID-19, after it is detected on a flight from Brisbane. The infected passengers were quarantined in Republic of Nauru Hospital.
- 8 June – The parliament of Nauru passes a constitutional amendment, which requires members of parliament to either be, or be descended from, Nauruan citizens born before, or on, the nation's independence on 30 January 1968.
- 25 June – This was the first day for the age group of children 5–11 to receive their COVID-19 vaccinations.
- 1 July – Nauru experiences its first death from COVID-19, later revealed to be Olympian weightlifter Reanna Solomon.
- 23 July – The Micronesian Games Council holds a virtual meeting in which they confirm Nauru as the host for the 2026 Micronesian Games.
- 24 September – 2022 Nauruan parliamentary election: Voters in Nauru elect their parliament.
- 28 September – Russ Kun becomes the new president of Nauru, replacing Lionel Aingimea.
- 1 October – The deal designating Nauru as Australia's regional processing centre lapses after the Australian Department of Home Affairs fails to alert Home Affairs Minister Clare O’Neil about the deal's expiration.
- 15 November – President Kun meets with Taiwanese President Tsai Ing-wen in Taipei.
- 22 November – The first group of refugees, six in total, to be resettled from the Australian offshore detention centers in Nauru arrive in Auckland, New Zealand, nine years after New Zealand offered to take in the refugees from Nauru.

== Deaths ==
- 1 July – Reanna Solomon, Olympian weightlifter (b. 1981).
