= Higgs and Wilson =

20th-century Jamaican singing duo

Higgs and Wilson were a Jamaican singing duo, consisting of Joe Higgs and Roy Wilson. Higgs And Wilson, who came from Kingston's Trenchtown area, were one of Jamaica's first indigenous recording artists, and their debut single, "Oh Manny Oh"—produced by future Prime Minister Edward Seaga's West Indies Records Limited—sold over 50,000 copies in Jamaica in 1960. In the early 1960s they worked with the producer Coxsone Dodd, and had several further hits, including "How Can I Be Sure" and "There's A Reward". Higgs went solo after Wilson left Jamaica for the United States in the late 1960s. Bob Andy described Higgs and Wilson as "the best duo I heard in those days...Roy Wilson was a very good tenor, very good tenor."

Higgs died from cancer in 1999. Wilson died in May 2012.

== Singles discography ==
- "Give Me a Try" – 1960 (FTW 101) Luxor
- "Gun Talk" – 1960 (FTW 102) Luxor
- "I Long for the Day" – 1960 (ZSP 50415-1A) WIRL
- "It Is A Day" – 1960 (ZSP 50417-1A) WIRL
- "Lover's Song" – 1960 (ZSP 50416-1A) WIRL
- "Oh Manny Oh" – 1960 WIRL
- "Pretty Baby" – 1960 (ZSP 50414-1A) WIRL
- "When You Tell Me Baby" – 1960 WIRL
- "Change Of Mind" – 1961 (ZSP-53124-1A) WIRL
- "Come On Home" – 1961 (ZSP 53126-1A) WIRL
- "How Can I Be Sure" – 1961 (FC 165) Supreme
- "Mighty Man" – 1961 (FC 168) Supreme
- "The Robe" – 1961 (ZSP 53127-1A) WIRL
- "Ska Ba Da" – 1961 (ZSP 53125 1-A) WIRL
- "Bye and Bye" – 1962 (FC 2459) ND Records
- "If You Want Pardon" – 1962 (FRS 2393) Dutchess
- "Deep in My Heart" – 1963 (LOP 110) Gay Disc
- "Kisses" – 1963 (LOP 109) Gay Disc
- "Last Saturday Morning" – 1963 Beverly's
- "Let Me Know" – 1963 (FC 2458) ND Records
- "Praise the Lord" – 1963 Beverly's
- "Gone Is Yesterday" – 1964 (LOP 127) SEP
- "Love Not For Me" – 1964 (LOP 128) SEP
- "My Baby" – 1964 Prince Buster
- "Pain in My Heart" – 1964 (FB 6183) Islam
- "To Spend An Evening" 1964 (FB 6340) Islam
- "There's A Reward" – 1965 (WC-8) Wincox
- "Your Love is Mine" – 1965 (WC-7) Wincox
- "Don't Mind Me" – 1969 (Dyna CE 713-1) Clandisc
- "Again" – 1970 (CE 1158-1) Humasound

== See also ==
- Music of Jamaica
