= 2025 in Nauru =

- Decades: 2000s; 2010s; 2020s
- See also: Other events of 2025; Timeline of Nauruan history

Events in the year 2025 in Nauru.

== Incumbents ==
- President: David Adeang
- Speaker of Parliament: Marcus Stephen

== Events ==
- 20 March – Nauru establishes diplomatic relations with Uzbekistan.
- 15 May – Nauru establishes diplomatic relations with Oman.
- 3 September – Australia and Nauru sign a 30-year agreement under which Nauru will host deported non-citizens from Australia in exchange for A$2.5 billion (US$1.62 billion). The deal includes an upfront A$400 million endowment fund and annual payments of A$70 million.
- 11 October –
  - 2025 Nauruan parliamentary election
  - 2025 Nauruan constitutional referendum
- 14 October – David Adeang is re-elected president.
- 9 December – The United Kingdom imposes visa requirements on Nauru citizens in response to its citizenship by investment program.

== Holidays ==
- 1 January – New Year's Day
- 31 January – Independence Day
- 8 March – International Women's Day
- 18 April – Good Friday
- 21 April – Easter Monday
- 22 April – Easter Tuesday
- 17 May – Constitution Day
- 1 July – RONPhos Handover Day
- 19 August – Ibumin Earoeni Day
- 25 September – National Youth Day
- 26 October – Angam Day
- 25 December – Christmas Day
- 26 December – Boxing Day
