= CALL/360:BASIC =

Programming language

CALL/360:BASIC is an IBM dialect of the BASIC programming language for the System/360 and later platforms. It was based on mid-1960s versions of Dartmouth BASIC but added a number of extensions. Most of these were related to file handling, which, at that time, Dartmouth lacked. It also added support for the mathematical symbols found on some IBM terminals, so that <= could be entered directly as ≤. Differences are otherwise minor.

== History ==
CALL/360:BASIC was announced in 1968, along with several other languages for the system including APL and FORTRAN and the Datatext markup language based text editor. Early advertizing for the system boasted that one could "Start learning CALL / 360 : BASIC after breakfast and you can share our computer before lunch".

The CALL/360 suite was developed within IBM's Information Marketing department. Initially, the products were considered proprietary and could only be accessed via the online service. Customer demand forced them to offer these products to other System/360 users, which they did by releasing it on an "as is" basis with no support. Later the same year, IBM transferred this department, along with the rest of its timesharing services, to the Service Bureau Corporation (SBC), including the CALL/360 operating system (later known as CALL/OS) and CALL/360:BASIC. Manuals after that date refer to the language as an SBC product.

In 1973, SBC was itself transferred to Control Data Corporation as part of a long running anti-trust lawsuit.

== Description ==
CALL/360:BASIC is almost identical to Dartmouth BASIC the Fourth, including support for the advanced MATrix math features. It differs primarily in its support of file handling.

=== Basics ===
The language included the commands LET, PRINT, END, FOR...NEXT with an optional STEP, (Note: The manual often fails to mention optional features, STEP is not mentioned in the list of keywords for instance, although NEXT is. STEP does appear in the detailed description of the FOR loop later in the manual.) GOTO, GOSUB...RETURN, IF...THEN, IF...GOTO, DEF, READ, DATA, RESTORE DIM, and REM. To this list, it added computed GOTO of the form GOTO 100,200,300 ON X. Note that the THEN in an IF statement can only be followed by a line number, the idea of allowing arbitrary statements after THEN did not appear until later. REMarks are always shown with a colon in the manual, REM: or REMARK:, but it is not clear if these were required. The RESTORE, END and STOP commands could also be followed by a comment string, where a colon was not required.

PRINT was expanded with PRINT USING followed by a line number. The line referred to started with a colon and then a series of formatting strings. This series of strings was known as an "image". Items to be printed could be separated by commas or semicolons, with commas having "print zones" 18-characters wide. A new command, PAUSE, stopped the program with a statement PAUSE AT LINE 35 and then waited for the user to enter text, which was ignored. The end-of-line character caused the program to continue. (Note: In this respect, PAUSE operates identically to an INPUT, differing only in that it prints the line number.) It could also be followed by a comment in the source.

It also included the same basic set of math instructions as Dartmouth, +, -, * and /, as well as the up-arrow for exponents and adding the two-asterisk form, 10**9. Logical operators included the standard set of =, >, =>, <, <= and <>, as well as the special character versions, ≥, ≤, ≠. It included the standard set of mathematical functions from Dartmouth, adding COT, SEC, CSC, ASN, ACS, HSN, HCS, HTN, LTW for base-2 logs, and LGT for base-10. It also included DEG and RAD functions to convert between degrees and radians, and three pre-defined internal constants, &PI, $E and $SQR2, which could be used instead of typing in the actual numbers.

CALL/360 included string variables, only recently introduced to Dartmouth, using the same dollar-sign notation. It added the ability to delimit string constants with either single or double quotes, as well as the ability to type two of either character within a string to include a single character of that type. For instance, "ABC""DE" represents ABC"DE. Strings were broken into 18-character lengths internally, and strings that did not use up an entire 18-character record were padded with blanks, meaning "" would be interpreted as 18 spaces.

=== Arrays and matrix math ===
Like early versions of Dartmouth, CALL/360:BASIC supported one and two dimensional arrays, with the lower index always being 1. Thus an array defined using DIM A(3) contains three values, A(1) through A(3). CALL/360 also added the ability to define string arrays, with each entry being a single 18-character string. In contrast to Dartmouth, it does not appear variables were always DIMed; in Dartmouth one could refer to A(5) without dimensioning A, in which case it had a default behaviour of being DIM A(10). The manual does not explicitly say CALL/360 does not do this, but it does state variables cannot be used in matrix operations without being dimensioned. A maximum of 29 numeric arrays were allowed in a program, with the total sum of the elements across all arrays being no more than 7167.

CALL/360:BASIC included most of the matrix commands from Dartmouth, including the ability to perform basic math on a matrix as a single operation, like MAT A = A * 10 where A is an array that will then have all of its elements multiplied by 10. It also included the functions CON, IDN ZER, INV and TRN. Data could be loaded into a matrix with MAT READ and output with MAT PRINT. To these original commands they also added GET and PUT, which were used to read or write all the elements in a matrix to or from a file.

=== Files ===
The major addition to CALL/360:BASIC was a usable file handling system. This started with the OPEN 10, 'filename' which opened a file and assigned it to the provided file number, 10 in this case, which could be an expression. Reading from the file was accomplished with GET 10: A, B, C in the same general fashion as the READ statement. Writing was handled by the otherwise identical PUT. The file pointer could be moved back to the start of the file with RESET followed by one or more file numbers. There was no way to specify a position within a file. CLOSE with a similar list of one or more file numbers freed the file handles.

== Example ==
The following program opens the file TEMPFILE for input as file handle 10, and then reads lines of data containing a product name and four sales prices in a loop. Notice that the loop is not terminated, instead, this program ends when it runs out of data and causes a END OF FILE error. How control is passed to line 70 at that point is not explained in the manual. The output to the screen is formatted using the image on line 50.

10 OPEN 10, 'ITEMFILE', INPUT 
20 GET 10: A$,A,B,C,D
30 LET Al = (A+B+C+D)/4
40 PRINT USING 50, A$,Al
50 :AVERAGE PRICE FOR A ######## IS $#.## 
60 GOTO 20
70 CLOSE 10
80 END
