= 2006 in Nauru =

- Decades: 1980s; 1990s; 2000s; 2010s; 2020s
- See also: Other events of 2006; Timeline of Nauruan history

The following lists events that happened during 2006 in the Republic of Nauru.

== Incumbents ==
- President: Ludwig Scotty

== Events ==
=== June ===
- June 26 - A deal is revealed where Australia agreed to pay US$29 million to clean up corruption in Nauru in exchange for Nauru accepting refugees who attempt to enter Australia.

=== December ===
- The 2006 Nauru Household Income and Expenditure Survey is conducted. An initial mini census listing exercise was conducted in late September 2006.
