= Trevor S. Harris =

American economist

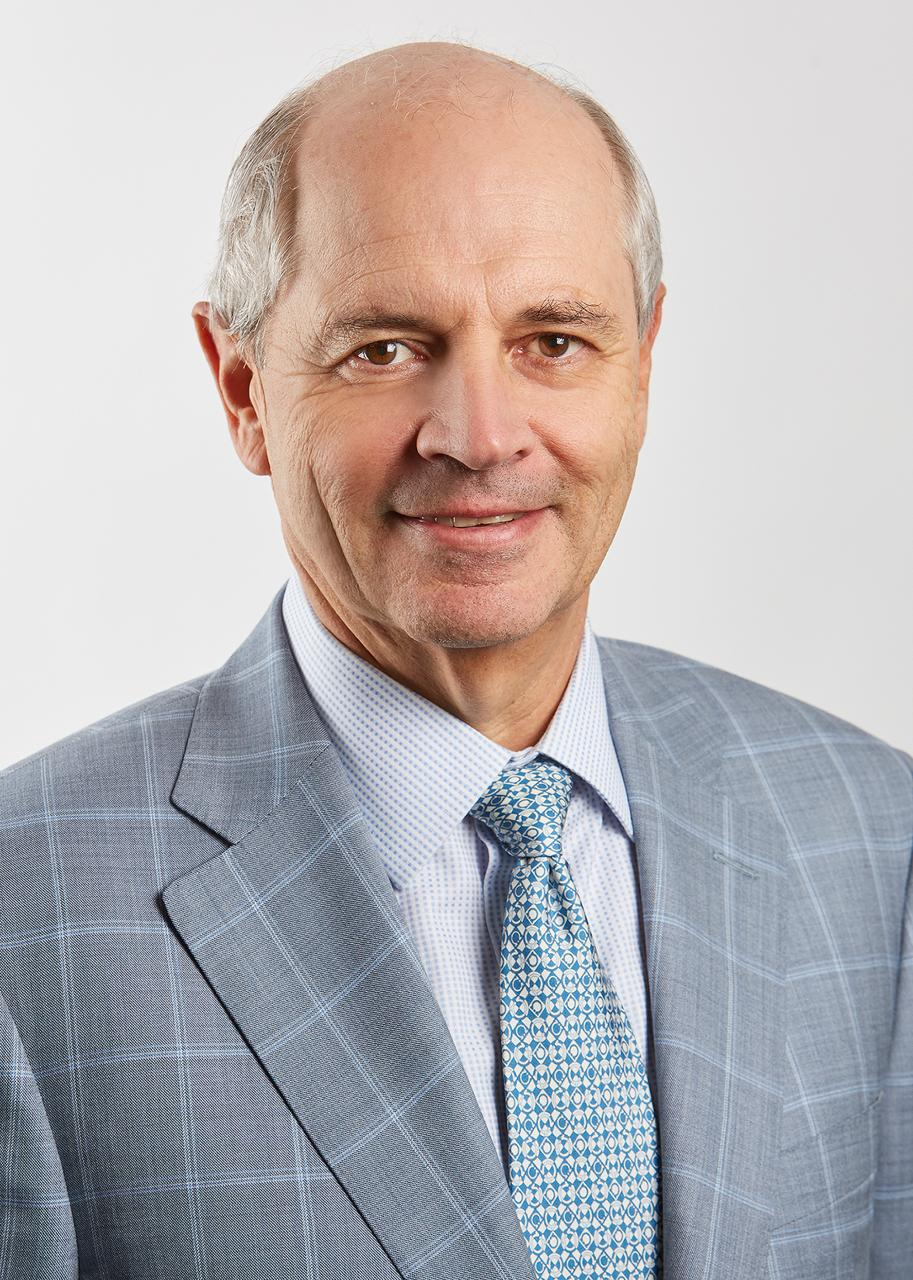
- Born: Bulawayo, Zimbabwe
- Organization(s): Morgan Stanley; Financial Accounting Standards Board (FASB); International Accounting Standards Board; Salomon Brothers

Academic background
- Education: University of Cape Town; University of Washington
- Awards: Deloitte Foundation Wildman Medal, American Accounting Association (2021)

Trevor Samuel Harris is an American accounting scholar and business executive who serves as the Arthur J. Samberg Professor Emeritus of Professional Practice at Columbia Business School. He is known for his research and applied work on financial reporting, valuation, and the use of accounting information in investment and management decisions. Harris has held leadership positions both in academia and in industry, including at Morgan Stanley, and has served on advisory bodies to the Financial Accounting Standards Board (FASB) and the International Accounting Standards Board (IASB).

== Early life and education ==
Harris was born in Bulawayo, Zimbabwe. While a student in Bulawayo, he was elected Junior Mayor of the city, a youth leadership position associated with local civic engagement programs. He also served as Head Boy at both his primary and secondary schools.

He earned a Bachelor of Commerce degree and a Bachelor of Commerce (Honors) with a Certificate in the Theory of Accountancy from the University of Cape Town, followed by a Master of Commerce degree while qualifying as a Chartered Accountant in 1977. He completed his Ph.D. in Business Administration at the University of Washington in 1983, supported by an Arthur Andersen Doctoral Dissertation Fellowship.

== Academic career ==
Harris joined Columbia Business School in 1983 as an assistant professor and spent most of his academic career there, rising through the ranks to become the Roy Bernard Kester and T.W. Byrnes Professor of Accounting and Auditing (1994–1997) and later the Jerome A. Chazen Professor of International Business (1998–2000). He chaired Columbia’s Accounting Department from 1999 to 2000 and served as Academic Director of the Chazen Institute of International Business.

He co-founded and co-directed the Center for Excellence in Accounting and Security Analysis (CEASA), an academic–industry initiative aimed at improving the quality of financial analysis and corporate reporting. He held the title of Chazen Senior Research Scholar from 2009 to 2022 and became the Arthur J. Samberg Professor of Professional Practice in 2009, before assuming emeritus status in 2020.

In addition to Columbia, Harris was a visiting associate professor at the University of Chicago Booth School of Business from 1987 to 1988.

== Professional and industry experience ==
Harris began his career in finance as a Vice-President in equity research at Salomon Brothers in 1993.

From 1997 to 2008, he held senior roles at Morgan Stanley, including Managing Director and Head of the Global Valuation and Accounting Team, later becoming Managing Director of Valuation, Accounting and Enterprise Risk, and then Vice Chairman for Client Services and Director of Special Projects. He served as a Senior Advisor from 2008 to 2010. At Morgan Stanley, he led the development of ModelWare and the Risk-Reward Platform, tools widely used in equity research. He was named to the Institutional Investor All-American Research Team in 2002 and to the Wall Street Journal SmartMoney Power 30 in 2003.

== Research ==
Harris's early work examined the value relevance of accounting numbers and cross-country differences in accounting systems, including comparative studies of U.S., German, and Japanese practices published in the Journal of Accounting Research and the Journal of International Financial Management & Accounting. He later contributed to research on corporate taxation, dividend policy, and firm valuation, publishing in the Journal of Public Economics and the Journal of Accounting Research, and collaborating with R. Glenn Hubbard and Deen Kemsley.

Harris also produced influential work on earnings quality, intrinsic value, and market efficiency, including widely cited articles in the Journal of Accounting Research and the Journal of Accounting and Economics. His later scholarship integrates academic research with capital markets practice, including contributions to The Handbook of Systemic Risk (2013) and the monograph Foreign Currency: Accounting, Communication and Management of Risks (2022, with Shiva Rajgopal).

== Awards and honors ==
- Deloitte Foundation Wildman Medal, American Accounting Association (2021)
- Institutional Investor All-American Research Team (2002)
- Wall Street Journal SmartMoney Power 30 (2003)
- Singhvi Prize for Excellence in Teaching (1985)
- Chazen Institute Prize for Innovation in Teaching (1996)
- Dean’s Award for Innovation in the Curriculum (2011)
- Margaret Chandler Award for Commitment to Excellence (multiple years)
- President’s Teaching Award Finalist, Columbia University (1997, 2011, 2013)

== Bibliography ==
- Trevor S. Harris (1995). International Accounting Standards Versus US-GAAP Reporting: Empirical Evidence Based on Case Studies. South-Western College Publishing. ISBN 978-0-538-85693-5. OCLC 33352230.
- Harris, T. S., & Rajgopal, S. (2022). “Foreign Currency: Accounting, Communication and Management of Risks.” Foundations and Trends in Accounting, 16(3), 184–307.
- Khan, U., Nissim, D., & Harris, T. S. (2018). “The Expected Rate of Credit Losses on Banks’ Loan Portfolios.” The Accounting Review, 93(5), 245–271.
- Herz, R., Harris, T. S., & Nissim, D. (2013). “Accounting’s Role in the Reporting, Creation, and Avoidance of Systemic Risk in Financial Institutions.” In The Handbook of Systemic Risk. Cambridge University Press.
- Harris, T. S., Kemsley, D., & Hubbard, R. G. (2001). “The Share Price Effects of Dividend Taxes and Tax Imputation Credits.” Journal of Public Economics, 79(3), 569–596.
- Harris, T. S., & Kemsley, D. (1999). “Dividend Taxation in Firm Valuation: New Evidence.” Journal of Accounting Research, 37(2), 275–292.
- Easton, P. D., & Harris, T. S. (1991). “Earnings as an Explanatory Variable for Returns.” Journal of Accounting Research, 29(1), 19–36.
