= 2020 in Nauru =

- Decades: 2000s; 2010s; 2020s
- See also: Other events of 2020; Timeline of Nauruan history

The following lists events that happened during 2020 in the Republic of Nauru.

== Incumbents ==
- President: Lionel Aingimea
- Speaker of Parliament: Marcus Stephen

== Events ==
Ongoing – COVID-19 pandemic in Nauru

=== January ===
- 31 January – Nauru establishes diplomatic relations with Kyrgyzstan.

=== March ===
- 31 March – 209 asylum seekers remain in Nauru after being transferred from Australia.
- Nauru halts most international flights and imposes strict quarantine measures to prevent the introduction of COVID-19. Curfews and movement restrictions are enforced with severe penalties.

=== June ===
- The government introduces the National Disaster Risk Management (Amendment) Bill 2020, criminalizing social media posts that mislead the public or distort official information, and expanding police powers during national disasters.
- Nauru announces plans to introduce harsher laws for sex offenders, reducing bail eligibility and limiting mitigation based on the perpetrator's age.

=== July ===
- 6 July – Despite there being no reported cases of COVID-19, the government declared a national emergency as a preventive measure, suspending all but one weekly flight to the country and instituting a 14-day quarantine for all arrivals.
- President Lionel Aingimea becomes chancellor of the University of the South Pacific, acknowledging governance and corruption issues at the institution.

=== September ===
- 14 September – It was announced that President Lionel Aingimea and the leaders of Kiribati, Palau, the Federated States of Micronesia and the Marshall Islands will be hosting an in-person meeting. President Lionel Aingimea said the leaders agreed to attend Palau's Independence Day on October 1 as the five Pacific countries remain free of COVID-19.

=== October ===
- The United States agrees to resettle over 1,100 asylum seekers from Nauru and Papua New Guinea by early 2021.

=== December ===
- The planned opening of the Nauru International Port is delayed.
