= Timeline of Ghanaian history =

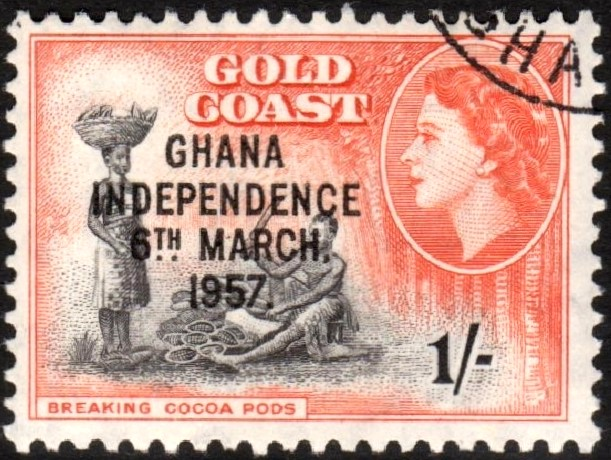
A postage stamp of Gold Coast overprinted for Ghanaian independence in 1957.

Ghana gained independence from the British on 6 March 1957. It is a member of the Commonwealth of Nations. The country became a republic on July 1, 1960.

== History ==
Prior to Independence, Ghana was known as the Gold Coast. The currency used before Independence was the British West African pound and in 1958 it was changed to Ghanaian pound. The Ghanaian pound was used between 1958 and 1965 and afterwards changed to Ghanaian Cedi.

== Major years and events ==
- 1480- The king of Portugal commissioned the construction of Elmina castle
- 1482 - the Portuguese become first Europeans to set up trading settlement in Ghana and Sub-Saharan Africa.
- 1598 - the Dutch joined the Portuguese in trading gold to establish Dutch Gold coast.
- 1701 - The Battle of Feyiase marks the rise of the Ashanti Empire

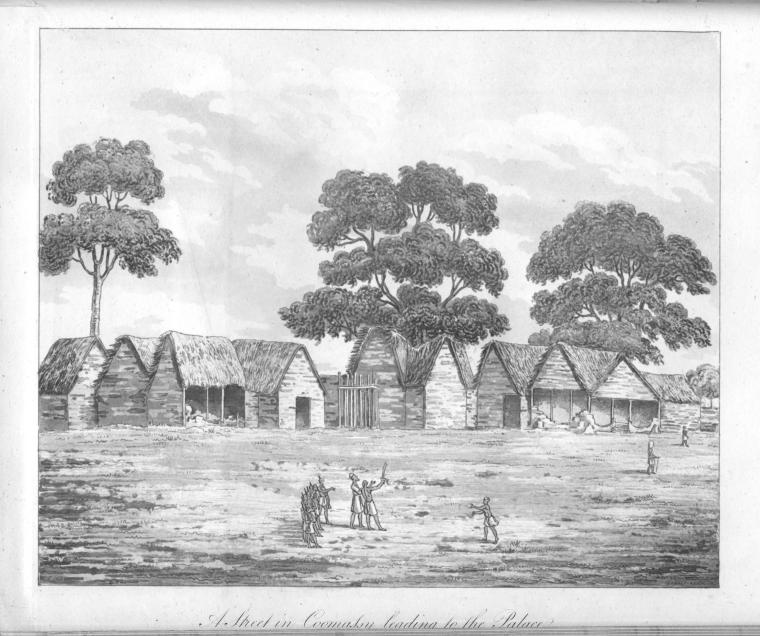
A street in Kumasi, c. 1820

- 1874 - the British declare coastal area of the Gold Coast as a colony as British Gold coast.
- 1946 - First legislative council elections take place.
- 1951- Kwame Nkrumah won the Gold coast Legislative elections for 1952 Gold coast Legislative Assembly.
- 1957 March - Ghana becomes independent with Kwame Nkrumah as prime minister.
- 1960 - Ghana becomes a republic. Kwame Nkrumah becomes the country's first elected president.
- 1964 - Kwame Nkrumah declares that there will be no other political party apart from the Convention People's Party (CPP), the one party state system.
- 1966 - Nkrumah is overthrown in military coup by Emmanuel Kwasi Kotoka.
- 1969 - Kofi Busia is elected prime minister after a new constitution is drawn.
- 1972 - Busia is overthrown by Col. Ignatius Kutu Acheampong, in military coup.
- 1978 - Acheampong is made to resign; General Frederick Akuffo takes over.
- 1979 - Akuffo overthrown in another coup by Flight Lieutenant Jerry Rawlings. Acheampong and Akuffo tried and executed on charges of corruption.
- 1979 September - Dr. Hilla Limann is elected as president of the Ghana.
- 1981 - Limann is overthrown by Rawlings in military coup. This was after two years of weak government and economic stagnation.
- 1981-Suspension of the Constitution and the ban on all political parties.
- 1983 - Rawlings implements conservative economic policies.
- 1992 - Referendum approves new constitution introducing a multiparty system.
- 1992 - Rawlings is elected president of Ghana.
- 1994 - 1000 Ghanaians killed and with 150,000 displaced in the Northern Region after a tribal conflict between the Konkomba and the Nanumba ethnic groups over land ownership.
- 1994 - Grand Orange Lodge of Ghana leader Emmanuel Aboki Essien became the first black and African Imperial Grand President of the Orange Order.
- 1994 - They later sign peace agreements with seven other ethnic groups.
- 1995 - Curfew imposed in the Northern Region after ethnic violence re-erupts leads to 100 deaths.
- 1996 - Jerry Rawlings re-elected as president of Ghana.
- 2000 - December - John Kufuor is elected president of Ghana after defeating John Atta Mills in the presidential elections.
- 2001 May - 126 die due to stampede in the Accra Sports Stadium. Inquiry implicate the Police for overreacting to crowd disturbances.
- 2001 June - Government cancels the celebration of June 4 revolution (the coup that brought Jerry Rawlings to power).
- 2002 April - Overlord of Dagbon, Ya Na Yakubu Andani and 30 others killed in Dagbon. A State of emergency is declared by government, it was lifted August 2004.
- 2002 May - National Truth and reconciliation commission inaugurated by President Kufuor, with the purpose to investigate human rights violations during Ghana's military rule.
- 2003 October - Government approves merger of two gold-mining firms, leading to the formation of AngloGold Ashanti.
- 2004 December - John Kufuor re-elected as president of Ghana.
- 2006 - Ghana National football team, the black stars play in the 2006 FIFA World Cup.
- 2007 March - Ghana @ 50 celebrations mark 50 years of independence from Britain.
- 2007 June - Ghana discovers oil in commercial quantities. The oil reserves total 3 billion barrels.

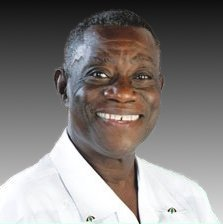
John Evan Atta Mills, former President of Ghana

- 2008 December - John Atta Mills elected president.
- 2009 July - US President Barack Obama visits, making the first Sub-Saharan country to be visited by the 44th President of the United States.
- 2009 October - Sale of Ghana Telecom to Vodafone of the UK
- 2010 December - Offshore oil production begins.
- 2010 - Census by Ghana statistical service.
- 2012 July - On July 24, President John Atta Mills died. John Dramani Mahama was sworn in as substantive president in less than 12 hours after John Atta Mills died. State burial for the late president was held on the 8th through to the 10th of August. Attah Mills was buried at the place now known as the Asomdwoe Park
- 2016 December- On December 7, 2016, elections were organized and Nana Akuffo-Addo was elected President of Ghana.
- 2017 September- Free compulsory Senior High School was introduced as a flagship program under the government's administration. In that same year the double track system was introduced to accommodate more students into the free Senior High school program due to inadequate infrastructure.
- 2018 November - Ghana hosted Women's African cup of Nations tournament.
- 2018 December- on 27 December there was a referendum to divide parts of the regions to add Six additional regions to the ten regions
- 2019 April - Ghana first brain surgery (Endovascular brain aneurysm coiling) at Euracare Advanced Diagnostic and Heart Centre in Accra.

== Notable Ghanaian births ==
- 1909, September 21 - Kwame Nkrumah.
- 1938, December 8 - John Kufuor, former president of Ghana.
- 1938, April 8 - Kofi Annan, seventh secretary-general of the United Nations
- 1944, July 21 - John Atta Mills, former president of the republic of Ghana
- 1944, March 24- Nana Akufo-Addo, President of the republic of Ghana.
- 1947, June 22 - John Jerry Rawlings, former president of the republic of Ghana.
- 1958, November 29 - John Dramani Mahama, president of Ghana, as successor to President John Atta Mills after his demise.
- 1963, October 7 - Mahamudu Bawumia, the vice president of Ghana

== Notable Ghanaian deaths ==
- 1972, April 27 - Kwame Nkrumah, 63, first President of Ghana, natural causes in Romania, (born 1909)
- 2012, July 24 - John Atta Mills, 68, then sitting president, died, and was in less than 12 hours time, succeeded by John Dramani Mahama, then Vice-president.
- 2012, November 16 - Aliu Mahama, 66, Ghana's first Muslim Vice President died.
- 2014, January 18- Komla Dumor, 41, of BBC News Focus of Africa host died of cardiac arrest.
- 2017, November 7 - Francis Allotey, 85, Ghanaian mathematician physicist known for Allotey Formalism.
- 2018, June 20 - Paa Kwesi Bekoe Ammisah -Arthur, 67, the fifth Vice President of the 4th Republic died
- 2018, August 18 - Kofi Annan, 80, seventh Secretary-General of the United Nations died in Switzerland.
- 2020, November 12 - Jerry Rawlings, 73, first President of the 4th Republic died

== See also ==
- Timeline of Accra
- History of Ghana

== Bibliography ==
- Institut für Afrika-Kunde; Rolf Hofmeier, eds. (1990). "Ghana". Afrika Jahrbuch 1989 (in German). Germany: Leske + Budrich. doi:10.1007/978-3-322-92639-5. ISBN 978-3-8100-0831-2. OCLC 19093344. "Politik, Wirtschaft und Gesellschaft in Afrika südlich der Sahara"
- "Ghana". Political Chronology of Africa. Political Chronologies of the World. Europa Publications. 2001. p. 194+. ISBN 978-0203409954.
- Michael Amoah (2011). "Ghana". In Andreas Mehler; et al. (eds.). Africa Yearbook: Politics, Economy and Society South of the Sahara in 2010. Vol. 7. Koninklijke Brill. pp. 99–108. ISBN 9789004205567. ISSN 1871-2525.
- David Owusu-Ansah [in German] (2014). "Chronology". Historical Dictionary of Ghana (4th ed.). Rowman & Littlefield. ISBN 978-0-8108-7500-5.
