= George Lyn =

Jamaican politician

Former Parliamentarian George Lyn was the Member of Parliament for North Central Clarendon.

== Career ==
Lyn ran for parliament in 1993 as a member of the People's National Party (PNP), successfully contesting the North Central Clarendon seat. He secured reelection in 1997 against Pearnel Charles of the Jamaica Labour Party (JLP). However, he lost in the 2002 general election to Charles, garnering 4,519 votes to the JLP candidate's 5,823 votes. At the age of 71, Lyn was the oldest PNP candidate.

== Later years and death ==
Lyn struggled with health issues in his final years and had a stroke in 2009. He died of complications from a heart attack on 17 July 2013 at the May Pen Hospital at the age of 81. Pearnel Charles paid tribute to his former political rival, describing him as a "man of the people" who was "very well loved by the constituents of North Central". Colin Campbell of the PNP, who had contested Lyn's former constituency in 2011, praised Lyn as a "great Jamaican" whose "generosity was still visible in all spheres of life". Lyn's funeral was held on 10 August 2013 at the Stuart Hill Clarendon College.

== Personal life ==
Lyn predeceased his wife Lena. His son Wade is the founder and chief executive officer of United Kingdom-based patty manufacturer Cleone Foods Limited. Lyn had five other sons and four daughters.
