= 1974 in Macau =

Events from the year 1974 in Portuguese Macau.

== Incumbents ==
- Governor - José Manuel de Sousa e Faro Nobre de Carvalho, José Eduardo Martinho Garcia Leandro

== Events ==
=== October ===
- 5 October - The opening of the Governador Nobre de Carvalho Bridge.
