= 2019 in Nauru =

- Decades: 1990s; 2000s; 2010s; 2020s
- See also: Other events of 2019; Timeline of Nauruan history

Events in the year 2019 in Nauru.

== Incumbents ==
- President
  - Baron Waqa (until 27 August)
  - Lionel Aingimea (after 27 August)
- Speaker of Parliament
  - Cyril Buraman (until 27 August)
  - Marcus Stephen (after 27 August)

== Events ==
- 8 January – President Waqa becomes the first world leader to visit Taiwan in 2019, and leaders of both countries promise to strengthen relations.
- 3 February – Australian Prime Minister Scott Morrison announces that the last four child refugees have left the Australian offshore refugee detention centres, leaving for resettlement in the United States.
- 24 March – The Parliament of Nauru, during a visit by Taiwanese President Tsai Ing-wen, passes a resolution rejecting the One China principle.
- 16 May – Nauru becomes a member state of the World Meteorological Organization.
- 30 May – Ludwig Scotty wins parliamentary by-election in the Anabar Constituency.
- 20 July – By the end of the 2019 Pacific Games, Nauru wins 34 medals, with 12 gold medals, 6 silver medals, and 16 bronze medals.
- 23 August – A Pakistani refugee in Nauru lights himself on fire.
- 24 August – The parliamentary elections and presidential election is held.
- 27 August – Lionel Aingimea is sworn in as president.
- 28 August – Nauru recognizes Jerusalem as the capital of Israel.
- 19 December – Fifteen members of the Nauru 19 are sentenced to jail terms by Judge Daniel Fatiaki after being found guilty in a retrial of charges stemming from a protest in 2015. Charges included rioting and assault.

== Deaths ==
- 8 May – Sprent Dabwido, former President of Nauru (2011–2013), in Armidale, Australia
