= 2021 in Nauru =

- Decades: 2000s; 2010s; 2020s
- See also: Other events of 2021; Timeline of Nauruan history

Events in the year 2021 in Nauru.

== Incumbents ==
- President: Lionel Aingimea
- Speaker of Parliament: Marcus Stephen

== Events ==
Ongoing – COVID-19 pandemic in Oceania

=== January ===
- 29 January – Former Chief Justice of Fiji Daniel Fatiaki is sworn in as Chief Justice of Nauru.

=== March ===
- 8 March – The first Nauruan High Commissioner to Australia Camilla Solomon presents her credentials to Governor-General David Hurley.

=== April ===
- 9 April – President Aingimea, Parliament Speaker Stephen, and Chief Justice Fatiaki along with each of their spouses all receive the first dose of the COVID-19 vaccine on the launch day for COVID-19 vaccination.

=== July ===
- 1 July – The Parliament of Nauru becomes autonomous, with the Speaker of Parliament gaining the ability to set parliamentary requirements.
- 10 July – Nauru unveils a World War II monument, dedicated to the Nauruans exiled to Truk in 1946 during the Japanese occupation of Nauru.

=== October ===
- 6 October – Australia closes its refugee detention center in Papua New Guinea, effectively shifting all operations to its detention center in Nauru.
- 7 October – Australian High Commissioner Helen Cheney presents her credentials to President Aingimea.
- 30 October – The national census begins.

=== November ===
- 13 November – A constitutional referendum is held in Nauru. Nauruans voted in favor of limiting parliament membership to those who gained citizenship when the constitution came into force in 1968, along with descendants of those who had.

== Deaths ==
- 29 November – Kinza Clodumar, President of Nauru (1997–1998), (b. 1945)

== See also ==
- COVID-19 in Oceania
