= Ezroy Millwood =

Ezroy Millwood (1942 – 1 December 2012), was president of Jamaica's National Transport Cooperative Society (NTCS). He sued the government for breach of its franchise agreement and was awarded more than $1.8 billion in damages. In June 2012, the Court of Appeal granted the government the go-ahead to challenge the award before the British Privy Council. He was later found dead at his home in St Andrew, near Kingston.
