= 1972 in Macau =

Events from the year 1972 in Portuguese Macau.

== Incumbents ==
- President - Américo Tomás
- Governor - José Manuel de Sousa e Faro Nobre de Carvalho

== Events ==
- The Companhia de Electricidade de Macau replaces the Macao Electric Lighting Company as the main public utility for electricity in Macau.
