= The Ant Commandos =

Video game console peripheral company

- Type: Corporation
- Industry: Video games
- Founded: 2005
- Headquarters: Chino, California, United States
- Products: Rock Band and Guitar Hero guitars
- Website: theantcommandos.com

The Ant Commandos, Inc. (TAC) was a designer, manufacturer and distributor of peripherals and accessories for video game consoles based out of Chino, California. Their flagship products were a line of corded and wireless guitar controllers for the PlayStation 2 music video game, Guitar Hero.

In 2006, RedOctane announced a lawsuit against The Ant Commandos alleging unfair competition, trademark infringement, and copyright infringement regarding their production of the guitar controllers. The Ant Commandos announced a counter claim on September 21, 2006, filed in the United States District Court for the Central District of California against Activision Publishing, Inc. and RedOctane, Inc. alleging that Activision and RedOctane copied the trade dress and design of their controller. Both suits were settled in December 2006, in an agreement which allowed TAC to continue selling Guitar Hero peripherals. In 2007, Activision, parent company of RedOctane, again filed suit against TAC, as well as against several former employees and clients of RedOctane, now working for TAC, alleging copyright infringement and misappropriating trade secrets, among other charges. The guitar controllers that were sold were the Freedom Vs, the Rocking Vs, The Shredder, and Basses of all kinds. They also sold the Tac Thunderbox 28r Amplifier that could be used to play a real electric guitar, a real microphone, and had audio inputs for any game console.

As of January 2014, The Ant Commandos website is defunct, and the company has not released any products.
