= 2026 in Jamaica =

- Decades: 2000s; 2010s; 2020s
- See also: Other events of 2026; Timeline of Jamaican history

Events in the year 2026 in Jamaica.

== Incumbents ==
- Monarch: Charles III
- Governor-General: Patrick Allen
- Prime Minister: Andrew Holness
- Chief Justice: Bryan Sykes

== Events ==
- 6–22 February – Jamaica at the 2026 Winter Olympics
- 5 March – Jamaica cancels a cooperation agreement with Cuba that allowed Cuban medical professionals to operate in the country.
- 17 May – The police killing of a woman involved in organizing protests against police killings triggers protests in Granville.
- 5 June – The entirety of Jamaica is hit by a power outage.

== Holidays ==
- 1 January – New Year's Day
- 18 February – Ash Wednesday
- 3 April – Good Friday
- 6 April – Easter Monday
- 23–25 May – Labour Day
- 1 August – Emancipation Day
- 6 August – Independence Day
- 19 October – National Heroes Day
- 25 December – Christmas Day
- 26 December – Boxing Day

== Deaths ==
- 18 January – Stephen "Cat" Coore, 69, guitarist and cellist (Third World).
- 26 January – Sly Dunbar, 73, drummer (Sly and Robbie), record producer ("Underneath It All"), and songwriter ("Murder She Wrote").
- 3 May – Leslie Campbell, 67, politician.
- 10 May – Ralph Ottey, 102, Jamaican-born British author and World War II veteran.
- 24 June – Oswald Harding, 90, president of the Senate (1980–1984, 2007–2011) and attorney general (1986–1989).
- 14 July – Fantan Mojah, 49, reggae singer.
- 9 September – Hyacinth Knight, 86, politician, MP (1983–1989).
- 23 September – Jackie Jackson, 79, bass player (Toots and the Maytals).

== See also ==
- 2026 in the Caribbean
- 2026 Atlantic hurricane season
