= Neville Bonitto =

Jamaican cricketer

Personal information
- Full name: Neville Leopold Bonitto
- Born: 15 August 1924; Kingston, Jamaica
- Died: 14 January 2013 (aged 88); Fort Lauderdale, Florida, United States
- Batting: Right-handed

Domestic team information
- Years: Team
- 1947-48 to 1956-57: Jamaica

Career statistics
Competition	First-class
Matches	17
Runs scored	1413
Batting average	58.87
100s/50s	4/6
Top score	207 not out
Balls bowled	12
Wickets	0
Bowling average	–
5 wickets in innings	–
10 wickets in match	–
Best bowling	–
Catches/stumpings	11/–
- Source: Cricinfo, 15 February 2018

Neville Leopold Bonitto (15 August 1924 – 14 January 2013) was a cricketer who played first-class cricket for Jamaica from 1947 to 1957.

Neville Bonitto was a middle-order batsman who made his highest score of 207 not out against British Guiana in 1952-53, when he added 283 for the fifth wicket with Alfie Binns. He migrated to the United States in the 1950s.
