= Joaquim Pinto Correia =

Governor of Macau
- In office 15 May 1986 – 8 July 1987
- President: Mário Soares
- Prime Minister: Aníbal António Cavaco Silva
- Preceded by: Vasco de Almeida e Costa
- Succeeded by: Carlos Montez Melancia

Personal details
- Born: 16 June 1929 Porto, Portugal
- Died: 14 May 2011 (aged 81) Porto, Portugal

Chinese name
- Traditional Chinese: 馬俊賢
- Simplified Chinese: 马俊贤
Transcriptions
Standard Mandarin
- Hanyu Pinyin: Mǎ Jùnxián
Yue: Cantonese
- Jyutping: maa5 zeon3 jin4

Joaquim Germano Pinto Machado Correia da Silva (16 June 1929 – 14 March 2011) was the 124th Governor of Macau from 15 May 1986 to 8 July 1987.

== Biography ==
As a physician, he was the first Governor of Macau who was not a military general. He advocated humanism and social welfare during his term of office and visited Guangzhou as well as the entire Guangdong province from 22 to 24 February 1987. He resigned from office in May 1987, giving rise to the rumour that his resignation was related to corruption.

== See also ==
- Portuguese Macau
