= 1976 in Macau =

Events from the year 1976 in Portuguese Macau.

== Incumbents ==
- Governor - José Eduardo Martinho Garcia Leandro

== Events ==
=== February ===
- 17 February - The approval of Organic Statute of Macau.
