= 2025 in games =

This page lists board and card games, wargames, miniatures games, and tabletop role-playing games published in 2025. For video games, see 2025 in video gaming.

== Deaths ==
Date	Name	Age	Notability
January 7	Alan Emrich	65	American designer of board games and video games
January 21	Howard J. Morrison	92	American game designer
February 21	Rodger B. MacGowan	77	American artist and game designer
February 28	Ernie Gygax Jr.	65	Son of Gary Gygax, D&D playtester
April 19	George Barr	88	American artist, worked for TSR
May 6	Stephen Fabian	95	American artist
May 29	John Boardman	92	American physicist involved in Diplomacy play-by-mail and zines
June 17	François Marcela-Froideval	66	French role-playing game designer
July 1	Scott Haring	67	American role-playing game designer
