= 2018 in Nauru =

- Decades: 1990s; 2000s; 2010s; 2020s
- See also: Other events of 2018; Timeline of Nauruan history

Events in the year 2018 in Nauru.

== Incumbents ==
- President: Baron Waqa
- Speaker of Parliament: Cyril Buraman

== Events ==
- 10 January – Australian High Commissioner to Nauru Angela Tierney presents her credentials to President Waqa.
- 30 January – The Nauruan government lifts a temporary ban on Facebook started in 2015.
- 12 February – Nauru and South Ossetia abolish visa requirements for visits shorter than 90 days.
- 18 February – Thirty-five refugees leave Nauru for resettlement in Los Angeles in the United States.
- 25 February – Twenty-six refugees leave Nauru for resettlement in the United States.
- 4 March – Twenty-nine refugees leave Nauru for resettlement in the United States.
- 13 March
  - Nauru severs ties with the High Court of Australia.
  - Australian judge Geoffrey Muecke takes the oath of office to become a justice of the Supreme Court of Nauru.
- 9 April – Charisma Amoe-Tarrant wins Nauru a silver medal at the 2018 Commonwealth Games Women's +90kg weightlifting event in Gold Coast, Australia.
- 30 April – Sixteen refugees leave Nauru for resettlement in the United States.
- 1 June – Nauru nationals are granted visa-free entry to Taiwan for visits up to 30 days.
- 15 June – An Iranian asylum seeker's body is found in an Australian offshore processing centre on Nauru. The asylum seeker committed suicide, the third in processing centres on Nauru to do so.
- 2 July – Nauru announces plans to block the Australian Broadcasting Corporation from attending and covering the Pacific Islands Forum in September.
- 8 July – Twenty-three refugees leave Nauru for resettlement in the United States.
- 22 July – Thirty-six refugees leave Nauru for resettlement in the United States.
- 4 September – Television New Zealand reporter Barbara Dreaver is detained by the Nauru Police Force following an interviews with refugees.
- 13 September – Justice Geoff Muecke grants the Nauru 19 a permanent stay on their case tied to a protest in 2015.
- 4 December – The Nauru Court of Appeals formally opens.
- Full Date Unknown
  - Nauru partners with the company DeepGreen Resources for future deep sea mining.
  - A coalition of Australian human rights groups set 20 November as a deadline for removing refugee from offshore detention centres in Nauru.
