= Nora Dean =

- Born: Letetia Leonora Dean; 8 January 1944; Spanish Town, Jamaica
- Died: 29 September 2016 (aged 72) Connecticut, United States
- Genres: Rocksteady, reggae, gospel
- Instrument: Vocals
- Years active: 1969–2006
- Formerly of: The Soulettes, The Ebony Sisters

Letetia Leonora McLean (8 January 1944 – 29 September 2016), better known as Nora Dean, was a Jamaican reggae and later gospel singer, best known for her 1970 hit "Barbwire (In His Underpants)". Dean recorded solo and as a member of The Ebony Sisters, The Soul Sisters and The Soulettes.

== Biography ==
Born in Spanish Town on 8 January 1944 to Isolene Ricketts and David Dean, Nora Dean recorded as a member of The Soulettes (with Rita Marley) and The Ebony Sisters before recording as a solo artist. She recorded for Lee "Scratch" Perry, including the 1969 single "The Same Thing That You Gave to Daddy". Dean had her first hit in 1970 for producer Byron Smith with "Barbwire", based on The Techniques' "You Don't Care".

She enjoyed further success with "Night Food Reggae". She went on to record for Sonia Pottinger, Harry Mudie ("Let Me Tell You Boy"), and Bunny Lee, including a version of "Que Sera Sera", retitled "Kay Sarah". She contributed backing vocals to Jimmy Cliff's 1973 album Unlimited.

Dean moved to New York City in the mid-1970s, where she married. After several years away from music she returned in the 1980s, singing in a lovers rock style. In the 1990s she began recording again, now concentrating on gospel music, releasing several albums in the years that followed.

Dean moved to Connecticut in 2010, where she died on 29 September 2016, aged 72.

== Discography ==
- Play Me a Love Song (1981), Nationwide
- My Soul Loves Jesus (1996), Aquarius
- Melody of Praise (1998), Aquarius
- Down on My Knees (1999), Faith Gospel Recording Ministry
- The Love of God - Reach Down to Me (2000), Faith Gospel Records Productions
- Breakthrough (2003), Evangelist
- Merry Christmas (2004)
- At Calvary (2006)
