= 2016 in Nauru =

- Decades: 1990s; 2000s; 2010s; 2020s
- See also: Other events of 2016; Timeline of Nauruan history

Events in the year 2016 in Nauru.

== Incumbents ==
- President
  - Baron Waqa
- Speaker of Parliament
  - Ludwig Scotty (until 13 July)
  - Cyril Buraman (after 13 July)

== Events ==
- 4 February - Lucina Detsiogo is crowned Miss Nauru 2016.
- 8 April - Nauruan Ambassador to Taiwan Ludwig Keke is awarded by Taiwanese President Ma Ying-jeou with the Order of Brilliant Star.
- 13 May - Nauru holds its first citizenship ceremony, in which 35 people gain Nauruan citizenship.
- 27 May - Parliament passes a bill replacing their criminal code, and in doing so decriminalises homosexuality and suicide, and outlaws marital rape, among several other things.
- 9 July - Parliamentary elections are held, with President Waqa being re-elected.
- 10 July - MP Roland Kun flees Nauru to New Zealand after alleged involvement in capital protest in 2015.
- 11 July - The parliamentary election in the Aiwo Constituency are held, following a legal dispute, resulting in the elections of Milton Dube and Aaron Cook.
- 13 July - Cyril Buraman is elected speaker by the parliament.
- 15 July - The new cabinet of Nauru is sworn in.
- 27 July - President Tsai Ing-wen receives ambassador from Nauru to Taiwan Chitra Jeremaih.
- 12 November - Australian Prime Minister Malcolm Turnbull announces that Australia and the United States have made a one-off resettlement agreement regarding refugees held in Nauru and Manus Island.

== Deaths ==
- 29 September - Joni Madraiwiwi, Chief Justice of the Supreme Court of Nauru (2014–2016), in Suva, Fiji
- 8 December - Valdon Dowiyogo, Nauruan politician, MP, government minister, and former Speaker of Parliament, in Moscow, Russia
