= Trevor Boots Harris =

Jamaican entertainment journalist & broadcaster (1944/45-2014)

Trevor Boots Harris (1944/5 – 2014) was a Jamaican entertainment journalist and broadcaster. He was also a sound and stage consultant since 1993. He was most notably with the Jamaica Gleaner and The Herald.

He died of a heart attack at the age of 69.
