= 2023 in Nauru =

- Decades: 2000s; 2010s; 2020s
- See also: Other events of 2023; Timeline of Nauruan history

Events in the year 2023 in Nauru.

== Incumbents ==
- President:
  - Russ Kun (until 30 October)
  - David Adeang (from 30 October)
- Speaker of Parliament: Marcus Stephen

== Events ==
- 19 January – The second group of refugees, four in total, to be resettled from the Australian offshore detention centers in Nauru to New Zealand arrive.
- 23 January – The Nauruan government releases a statement claiming to have been unaware of its consul-general in Thailand, Onassis Dame, renting a property involved in criminal activity. The Nauruan government announced that it will launch its own investigation into the allegations against Consul-General Dame.
- 30 January
  - Taiwanese Ambassador Dean-Shiang Lin presents his credentials to President Kun.
  - Nauru receives US$10,000 from the Philippines in response to a call for assistance after its first outbreak of COVID-19 in June 2022.
- 7 February – Australian Home Affairs Minister Clare O’Neil moves to renew deal which designates Nauru as Australia's regional processing centre.
- 13 February – During the 21st meeting of the Micronesian Presidents' Summit in Pohnpei, President Kun hands over the chairmanship of the organization to the Federated States of Micronesia.
- 24 February – Former Nauruan President Baron Waqa is appointed as leader of the Pacific Islands Forum for 2024.
- 19 July – Acting President Martin Hunt declares a state of emergency over unexploded ordnance from World War II discovered on 7 July.
- 22 July – The last refugee held in Nauru under Australia's offshore detention policy arrives in Australia.
- 7 September – A group of 11 asylum seekers attempting to get to Australia are transferred to Nauru by the Australian government, the first transfer of asylum seekers to Nauru in nine years.
- 17 October – Nauru's first ambassador to Switzerland, Chitra Jeremiah, presents her credentials to President Alain Berset.
- 25 October – A vote of no confidence against President Kun passes through the Parliament.
- 30 October – David Adeang is elected as the new President of Nauru following a no-confidence vote for Russ Kun.
- October – Rosita Rokobuli is crowned Miss Nauru 2023.
- 9 November – President Adeang walks out of a Pacific Islands Forum meeting after objections were brought against former President Baron Waqa's nomination as leader.
- 14 November – Bendigo and Adelaide Bank, Nauru's only bank, announces its intentions to cease operation in Nauru by December 2024.
