= 2024 in Nauru =

- Decades: 2000s; 2010s; 2020s
- See also: Other events of 2024; Timeline of Nauruan history

Events in the year 2024 in Nauru.

== Incumbents ==
- President: David Adeang
- Speaker of Parliament: Marcus Stephen

== Events ==
- 15 January – Nauru withdraws recognition of Taiwan and establishes relations with China.
- 24 January – Nauru formally re-establishes diplomatic ties with China after withdrawing recognition of Taiwan.
- February – Over 40 asylum seekers found by the Australian Border Force in Western Australia on 16 February are taken to Nauru.
- 18 March – Bendigo & Adelaide Bank announces a delay in its exit from Nauru, changing it from December 2024 to July 2025.
- 25 March – President Adeang and Chinese President Xi Jinping hold first talks since Nauru's resumption of ties with the People's Republic of China.
- May – A group of 33 asylum seekers are transferred by the Australian Border Force to Nauru.
- 9 December – Nauru signs an AUD 40 million ($89 million) agreement with Australia allowing it to veto agreements entered by Nauru with third party states in exchange for security and policing guarantees and the opening of a branch of the Commonwealth Bank on the island.

== Holidays ==
- 1 January - New Year's Day
- 31 January - Independence Day
- 8 March - International Women's Day
- 29 March - Good Friday
- 30 March - Easter Saturday
- 1 April - Easter Monday
- 2 April - Easter Tuesday
- 17 May - Constitution Day
- 1 July - RONPhos Handover Day
- 19 August - Ibumin Earoeni Day
- 25 September - National Youth Day
- 26 October - Angam Day
- 25 December - Christmas Day
- 26 December – Boxing Day
