= 2015 in Jamaica =

- Decades: 1990s; 2000s; 2010s; 2020s
- See also: Other events of 2015; Timeline of Jamaican history

Events in the year 2015 in Jamaica.

== Incumbents ==
- Monarch: Elizabeth II
- Governor-General: Patrick Allen
- Prime Minister: Portia Simpson-Miller
- Chief Justice: Zaila McCalla

== Events ==
- Air Jamaica, national airline of Jamaica, ceased all operations.
- February – The Ganja Law, or Dangerous Drugs (Amendment) Act 2015, was passed by Jamaica's Houses of Parliament.

== Deaths ==
- 5 January – King Sporty, Jamaican-American reggae musician (b. 1943).
- 16 January – Louis Martin, Jamaican-born British weightlifter, Olympic silver (1964) and bronze (1960) medallist (b. 1946).
- 7 February – Richard Austin, cricketer.
- 2 March – Beverly Hall, Jamaican-born American educator (b. 1946).
- 27 March – Daundre Barnaby, 24, Jamaican-born Canadian Olympic runner (2012) (b. 1990)
- 30 March – John Elliott, Olympic boxer (1964) (b. 1931).
- 6 May – Errol Brown, Jamaican-born British singer (Hot Chocolate) (b. 1943)
- 8 July – Lloyd Reckord, actor and director (b. 1929).
- 31 July – Red Dragon, reggae singer (b. 1966).
- 2 October – Coleridge Goode, Jamaican-born British jazz bassist (b. 1914).
- 25 October – Basil Williams, cricketer (West Indies) (b. 1949).
- 25 November – O'Neil Bell, cruiserweight boxer, undisputed world champion (2006) (b. 1974).
- 3 December – Gladstone Anderson, musician (b. 1934).
- 11 December – Neville De Souza, religious figure, Bishop of Jamaica and the Cayman Islands (1979–2000).
- 19 December – Peter Broggs, reggae musician (b. 1952).
