= 2025 Nauruan constitutional referendum =

- 11 October 2025
- Do you agree that the term of the Parliament be increased from 3 to 4 years as approved and passed by the Parliament pursuant to the Constitution (Amendment) Bill 2025?

Results
Choice	Votes	%
Yes	3,714	44.67%
No	4,601	55.33%
Valid votes	8,315	99.21%
Invalid or blank votes	66	0.79%
Total votes	8,381	100.00%

A constitutional referendum was held in Nauru on 11 October 2025, the same day as the parliamentary election. The referendum was the result of a government proposal to amend the constitution to change the parliament term from three to four years. A two-thirds majority was required for the amendment to pass. A majority of voters rejected the proposed amendment.

All though the referendum failed to adopt the constitutional amendment, over 40% of voters voted in support of it. This allowed parliament to review the amendment. President David Adeang introduced the constitutional amendment before parliament in December 2025. On 26 March and 31 March 2026, Parliament unanimously voted in favor of the amendment, passing it into law.

== Results ==
Nauruan constitutional referendum, 2025
Choice	Votes	%
For	3,714	44.67
Against	4,601	55.33
Total	8,315	100.00
Valid votes	8,315	99.21
Invalid/blank votes	66	0.79
Total votes	8,381	100.00
Registered voters/turnout	8,731	95.99
Source: Electoral Commission of Nauru Nauru Bulletin
