= Carlos Melancia =

Governor of Macau (1927–2022)

Carlos Montez Melancia

Governor of Macau
- In office 9 July 1987 – 1990
- President: Mário Soares
- Prime Minister: Aníbal António Cavaco Silva
- Preceded by: Joaquim Pinto Correia
- Succeeded by: Vasco Rocha Vieira

Personal details
- Born: 21 August 1927 Alpiarça, Portugal
- Died: 23 October 2022 (aged 95)

Chinese name
- Traditional Chinese: 文禮治
- Simplified Chinese: 文礼治
Transcriptions
Standard Mandarin
- Hanyu Pinyin: Wén Lǐzhì
Yue: Cantonese
- Jyutping: man4 lai5 zi6

Carlos Montez Melancia (21 August 1927 – 23 October 2022) was a Portuguese politician. He was the Governor of Macau from 1987 to 1990. He was Minister of the Sea from 1983 to 1984, and a member of the Assembly of the Republic from 1985 to 1987.

== Early life ==
Carlos Montez Melancia was born in Alpiarça, on 21 August 1927.

== Career ==
Melancia served as Minister of Industry and Technology from 1976 to 1978, and Minister of the Sea from 1983 to 1984. He served in the Assembly of the Republic as a member of the Socialist Party from 1985 to 1987.

=== Governor ===
President Mário Soares appointed Melancia as Governor of Macau in 1987. He resigned as governor in 1990 due to a corruption scandal and was replaced by Vasco Joaquim Rocha Vieira.

Melancia pushed for the construction of the Macau International Airport. The localisation of Macau's civil service became official policy after Melancia visited China in May 1988, and set a time table for the civil service to be 50% natives in 1993, 70% by 1995, 80% by 1997, and 100% by 1999.

Melancia appointed four Macanese to the Legislative Assembly of Macau after the 1988 election in order to weaken the influence of its Chinese members.

Melancia was accused of taking $2.4 million in bribes while serving as governor. He was acquitted of the charges on 4 August 1993. He was accused of taking €250,000 from the German company Weidleplan in order to influence the airport construction, but was acquitted in 2002.

== Death ==
Melancia died at the São José Hospital in Lisbon on 23 October 2022, after suffering a fall.

== Works cited ==
=== Books ===
- Mendes, Carmen (2013). Portugal, China and the Macau Negotiations, 1986-1999. Hong Kong University Press. ISBN 9789888139002.

=== Journals ===
- Edmonds, Richard (1993). "Macau and Greater China". The China Quarterly (136). Cambridge University Press: 878–906. doi:10.2307/655595. JSTOR 655595.
- Yee, Herbert; Lo, Sonny (1991). "Macau in Transition: The Politics of Decolonization". Asian Survey. 31 (10). University of California Press: 905–919. doi:10.2307/2645063. JSTOR 2645063.
- Yee, Herbert (1999). "Prospects of democratisation: An Open-ended Game?". China Perspectives (26). French Centre for Research on Contemporary China: 28–38. doi:10.2307/24050690. JSTOR 24050690.

=== News ===
- "Ex-governor dies in Lisbon, aged 95". Macau Post Daily. 25 October 2022. Archived from the original on 14 November 2026.
- "Former governor Carlos Melancia passes away at 95". Macau Daily Times. 25 October 2022. Archived from the original on 14 November 2026.
- "Melancia verdict just, says president". South China Morning Post. 6 August 1993. Archived from the original on 14 November 2026.
