= Vasco Joaquim Rocha Vieira =

Portuguese military officer (1939–2025)

Vasco Joaquim Rocha Vieira GCTE GCC GCIH ComA
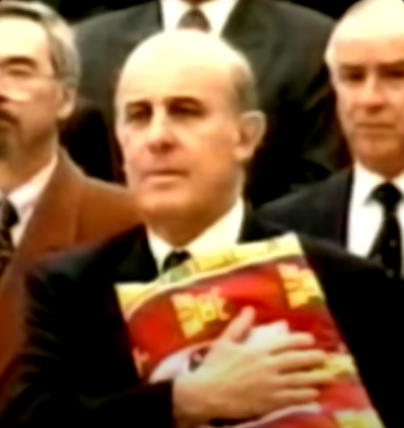

138th Governor of Macau
- In office 24 April 1992 – 19 December 1999
- President: Mário Soares; Jorge Sampaio
- Prime Minister: Aníbal António Cavaco Silva; António Manuel de Oliveira Guterres
- Preceded by: Carlos Melancia
- Succeeded by: Edmund Ho Hau Wah (Chief Executive of Macau)

Chancellor of the Ancient Military Orders
- In office 24 April 2006 – 14 March 2016
- President: Aníbal Cavaco Silva
- Preceded by: Rui de Alarcão
- Succeeded by: Jaime Gama

Minister for the Azores
- In office 12 July 1986 – 19 April 1992
- Prime Minister: Aníbal Cavaco Silva
- Preceded by: Tomás George da Conceição Silva
- Succeeded by: Mário Fernando de Campos Pinto

Chief of the Army General Staff
- In office 14 July 1976 – 3 April 1978
- Preceded by: António Ramalho Eanes
- Succeeded by: Pedro Gomes Cardoso

Personal details
- Born: 16 August 1939 Lagoa, Portugal
- Died: 22 January 2025 (aged 85)
- Party: Independent
- Spouse: Maria Leonor de Andrada Soares de Albergaria
- Children: 3
- Occupation: Army officer

Chinese name
- Traditional Chinese: 韋奇立
- Simplified Chinese: 韦奇立
Transcriptions
Standard Mandarin
- Hanyu Pinyin: Wéi Qílì
Yue: Cantonese
- Jyutping: wai4 kei4 laap6

Vasco Joaquim Rocha Vieira, GCTE GCC GCIH ComA (Chinese: 韋奇立; 16 August 1939 – 22 January 2025) was a Portuguese Army officer who was the last Governor of Macau.

== Background ==
Vieira was born on 16 August 1939. He was the son of João da Silva Vieira and Maria Vieira Rocha, as well as the paternal grandson of André de Sousa Vieira and his wife, Teresa de Jesus da Silva.

Vieira married in Alcântara, Lisbon, Portugal, on 20 November 1976, Maria Leonor de Andrada Soares de Albergaria, born in Lisbon on 18 April 1949, Licentiate in Roman Philology at the University of Lisbon and the daughter of João José Cabral Soares de Albergaria, 3rd Viscount (formerly Baron) of Torre de Moncorvo (with a Coat of arms of de Morais and Sarmento) and Representative of the Title of Viscount de Morais Sarmento, a mechanical engineer, and wife Maria Júlia Pellen de Campos de Andrada, of the Family of the former Counters of the Counts of the Realm and House, and had three sons.

Vieira died on 22 January 2025, at the age of 85.

== Degrees ==
Vieira was a Portuguese Administrator and a General Officer of Military Engineering of the Portuguese Army with the Course of the Army School and Licentiate in civil engineering by the Instituto Superior Técnico (Superior Technical Institute) of the University of Lisbon, and has the General and Complementary Course of the General Staff of the Army, the Superior Course of Command and Direction of the Portuguese Armed Forces and the Course of National Defense.

== Career ==
Among many other things Vieira was a civil servant in Macau prior to his governorship, being the Chief of General Staff of the Independent Territorial Command of Macau from 1973 to 1974 and Deputy Secretary for Public Works and Communications of the Government of Macau from 1974 to 1975. He then became Director of the Arm of Engineering of the Army from 1975 to 1976, Chief of General Staff of the Army and by inherency a Member of the Conselho da Revolução (Revolutionary Council) from 1976 to 1978 being the Captain of April who lasted more in Portuguese politics, with an extensive curriculum of public service. He was also made Honorary Director of the Arm of Engineering of the Portuguese Army.

After that he was the National Military Representative at the Supreme Headquarters Allied Powers Europe of the North Atlantic Treaty Organization in Belgium from 1978 to 1981, and then a professor and subdirector at the Instituto de Altos Estudos Militares (Institute of Military High Studies) between 1983 and 1984 and from 1984 to 1986 respectively. He served as the Minister of the Republic to the Autonomous Region of the Azores from 1986 to 1992.

Finally, he served as the 138th Governor of Macau from 24 April 1992 to 19 December 1999 and was the last Portuguese Governor of Macau prior to the 1999 handover of the colony back to China.

Following the handover, Vieira was a senior member of the Portuguese Golf Association (Associação Portuguesa de Golfe). Before the handover he also founded and was an active element at the Jorge Álvares Foundation, named after the first Portuguese said to have arrived in China. Another former Governor of Macau, General António Lopes dos Santos, served as president of the Jorge Álvares Foundation from 2000 until his death in 2009.

== Decorations ==
Vieira was granted numerous decorations, both national and foreign, among those:

- Portugal: Grand Cross of the Order of the Tower and Sword
- Portugal: Grand Collar of the Order of Infante D. Henrique
- Portugal: Grand Cross of the Order of Christ
- Portugal: Grand Cross of the Order of Infante D. Henrique
- Portugal: Commander of the Order of Aviz
- Medals of Distinguished Services of Gold and Silver
- Medals of Military Merit of 1st Class and 3rd Class
- Medals of Exemplary Behaviour of Gold and Silver
- Japan: Grand Cross of the Order of the Sacred Treasure
- Brazil: Grand Cross of the Order of Rio Branco
- Belgium: Grand Officer of the Order of Leopold II
- France: Commander of the Order of Merit
- United States of America: Commander of the Legion of Merit

Political offices
Preceded by Tomás George da Conceição Silva	Minister for the Azores; 1986–1991	Succeeded by Mário Fernando de Campos Pinto
Preceded by Carlos Melancia	Governor of Macau; 1992–1999	Position abolished Edmund Ho Hau Wah as Chief Executive of the Macau Special Administrative Region
