= Zaila McCalla =

Jamaican judge

The Honourable Zaila McCalla OJ

Chief Justice of Jamaica
- In office 27 June 2007 – 1 February 2018
- Preceded by: Lensley Wolfe
- Succeeded by: Bryan Sykes

Commissioner of the Electoral Commission of Jamaica
- Incumbent
- Assumed office 1 January 2020

Personal details
- Born: Zaila Rowena Morris; 31 January 1948 (age 78) Westmoreland, Jamaica
- Education: University of the West Indies
- Awards: Order of Jamaica (2007)

Zaila Rowena McCalla, OJ (née Morris; born 31 January 1948) is a Jamaican judge. Between 2007 and 2018, she was the Chief Justice of Jamaica.

== Early life and education ==
Zaila Rowena Morris was born on 31 January 1948 in Westmoreland Parish, Jamaica. She is one of six children of Herbert and Beryl Morris. She was educated at Chantilly All-Age School in Westmoreland, and at Montego Bay High School, an all-girls secondary school in Montego Bay. She studied law at the University of the West Indies, graduating with a Bachelor of Laws (LLB Hons) degree. She then attended Norman Manley Law School, where she completed a Legal Education Certificate (LEC).

== Legal career ==
McCalla was called to the bar on 27 September 1976. She served as a Deputy Clerk of Court from October 1976 to November 1977, and as a Clerk of Court from November 1977 to July 1980. On 1 July 1980, she joined the Department of Public Prosecutions as a Crown Counsel. In 1985, she served as acting Assistant Director of Public Prosecutions.

On 1 January 2020, she was appointed a selected commissioner to serve on the Electoral Commission of Jamaica.

=== Judiciary ===
In August 1985, McCalla was appointed a Resident Magistrate. She was promoted to Senior Resident Magistrate in 1996. From 1993 to 1996, she was also an acting Master in Chambers of the Supreme Court. In August 1996, she became a Master in Chambers, serving from 1996 to 1997.

On 7 July 1997, McCalla was appointed a Puisne Judge of the Supreme Court. She stood down from that appointment on 10 April 2006, when she was appointed a Judge of Appeal. In 2006, she was also an Acting Judge of the Grand Court of the Cayman Islands.

On 27 June 2007, McCalla was appointed the Chief Justice of Jamaica. As such, she is Jamaica's most senior judge and head of its judiciary. She is the first woman to hold that appointment. She was succeeded as chief justice by Bryan Sykes in March 2018.

== Personal life ==
McCalla has been married twice. She was first married to Adolph Holness but their marriage was later dissolved. In 1981, she married William McCalla. William is an Attorney-at-Law. She has three children; two sons and one daughter.

McCalla is an Anglican and attends the Church of St. Margaret, Liguanea, an Anglo-Catholic parish. On 1 July 2014, she was appointed the Chancellor of the Diocese of Jamaica and the Cayman Islands. In that role, she advises the bishop and the Diocese on matters of Canon Law.

== Honours ==
In 2007, McCalla was awarded the Order of Jamaica (OJ), and is therefore styled The Honourable. On 9 February 2016, she was made an Honorary Bencher of the Middle Temple, one of the English Inns of Court.
