= 1999 in Macau =

- Decades: 1970s; 1980s; 1990s; 2000s; 2010s
- See also: Other events of 1999; History of Macau

Events from the year 1999 in Macau.

== Incumbents ==
- Governor (Portugal): Vasco Joaquim Rocha Vieira
- Chief Executive (People's Republic of China): Edmund Ho
- President of the Legislative Assembly (People's Republic of China): Susana Chou

== Events ==
=== March ===
- 19 March - The opening of Macau Museum of Art in Sé.

=== December ===
- 5 December - The opening of Taipa Houses–Museum in Taipa.
- 11 December - The opening of Fire Services Museum in Santo António.
- 20 December
  - Transfer of sovereignty over Macau from Portugal to China.
  - The Macau Basic Law took effect.
  - The establishment of Monetary Authority of Macao.
