= 2000 in Macau =

- Decades: 1980s; 1990s; 2000s; 2010s; 2020s
- See also: Other events of 2000; History of Macau

Events from the year 2000 in Macau, China.

== Incumbents ==
- Chief Executive - Edmund Ho
- President of the Legislative Assembly - Susana Chou

== Events ==
=== January ===
- 18 January - The establishment of Liaison Office of the Central People's Government in the Macao Special Administrative Region.

=== May ===
- 28 May - 2000 Hong Kong–Macau Interport.
