= 2026 in Macau =

- Decades: 2000s; 2010s; 2020s
- See also: Other events of 2026; History of Macau

Events in the year 2026 in Macau, China.

== Incumbents ==
- Chief Executive: Sam Hou Fai
- President of the Legislative Assembly: Kou Hoi In

== Events ==
- 19 March – The Legislative Assembly approves a bill allowing closed-door trials for cases involving national security interests.
- 6 November – Au Kam San becomes the first person convicted in Macau on charges relating to the revised Macau National Security Law and is sentenced to 12.5 years' imprisonment.

== Holidays ==
- 1 January – New Year's Day
- 29 February – Chinese New Year's Eve
- 30–31 January – Chinese New Year
- 4 April - Qingming Festival
- 18 April - Good Friday
- 19 April - Holy Saturday
- 1 May - International Workers' Day
- 5 May - Buddha's Birthday
- 31 May - Dragon Boat Festival
- 1–2 October – National Day
- 7 October – Mid-Autumn Festival
- 29 October – Double Ninth Festival
- 2 November – All Souls' Day
- 8 December – Immaculate Conception
- 20 December – Macau S.A.R. Establishment Day
- 21 December – Winter Solstice Festival
- 24 December – Christmas Eve
- 25 December - Christmas Day
- 31 December – New Year's Eve
