= 2001 in Macau =

- Decades: 1980s; 1990s; 2000s; 2010s; 2020s
- See also: Other events of 2001; History of Macau

Events from the year 2001 in Macau, China.

== Incumbents ==
- Chief Executive - Edmund Ho
- President of the Legislative Assembly - Susana Chou

== Events ==
=== September ===
- 23 September - 2001 Macanese legislative election.

=== December ===
- 19 December - The opening of Macau Tower in Sé.
