= 2008 in Macau =

- Decades: 1980s; 1990s; 2000s; 2010s; 2020s
- See also: Other events of 2008; History of Macau

Events from the year 2008 in Macau, China.

== Incumbents ==
- Chief Executive - Edmund Ho
- President of the Legislative Assembly - Susana Chou

== Events ==
=== February ===
- 1 February - The opening of Ponte 16 in Santo António.
- 14 February - The habeas corpus case 3/2008 was heard before the Tribunal of Ultimate Instance.

=== June ===
- 15 June - 2008 Hong Kong–Macau Interport at Macau Olympic Complex.

=== August ===
- 1 August - The opening of Sofitel Macau At Ponte 16.
- 28 August - The premier of Zaia at The Venetian Macao.

=== November ===
- 8 November - Miss International 2008 at Venetian Arena.
