= 2002 in Macau =

- Decades: 1980s; 1990s; 2000s; 2010s; 2020s
- See also: Other events of 2002; History of Macau

Events from the year 2002 in Macau, China.

== Incumbents ==
- Chief Executive - Edmund Ho
- President of the Legislative Assembly - Susana Chou

== Events ==
=== April ===
- 21 April - 2002 Hong Kong–Macau Interport.

=== October ===
- 28 October - The launch of Lotus TV Macau.
