= 2004 in Macau =

- Decades: 1980s; 1990s; 2000s; 2010s; 2020s
- See also: Other events of 2004; History of Macau

Events from the year 2004 in Macau, China.

== Incumbents ==
- Chief Executive - Edmund Ho
- President of the Legislative Assembly - Susana Chou

== Events ==
=== May ===
- 18 May - The opening of Sands Macao in Sé.

=== June ===
- 11 June - 2004 Hong Kong–Macau Interport.

=== August ===
- 27 August - The launch of Macau Post Daily.

=== December ===
- 19 December - The opening of Sai Van Bridge connecting Taipa and Sé.
- 30 December - The opening of Handover Gifts Museum of Macao in Sé.
