= 2019 in Macau =

- Decades: 1990s; 2000s; 2010s; 2020s
- See also: Other events of 2019; History of Macau

Events from the year 2019 in Macau, China.

2019 Macau Grand Prix was held on the 17th of November, 2019.

== Incumbents ==
- Chief Executive: Fernando Chui
- President of the Legislative Assembly: Ho Iat Seng
