= 2015 in Macau =

- Decades: 1990s; 2000s; 2010s; 2020s
- See also: Other events of 2015; History of Macau

Events from the year 2015 in Macau, China.

== Incumbents ==
- Chief Executive - Fernando Chui
- President of the Legislative Assembly - Ho Iat Seng

== Events ==
=== March ===
- 25 March - 9th Asian Film Awards at The Venetian Macao.
- 31 March - Power outage hit Macau affecting 35 buildings and 4,200 households due to underground cable failure.

=== April ===
- 15 April - Power outage hit Macau affecting 100,000 customers in one third of Macau Peninsula due to malfunction in Canal dos Patos substation.

=== July ===
- 10 July - 2nd Macao Symposium on Biomedical Sciences by the Faculty of Health Sciences of University of Macau.

=== September ===
- 3 September - 70th anniversary of Chinese Victory over Japan commemorative ceremony at Tap Seac Square.
- 17–20 September - Men's Macau Open 2015.
- 17–21 September - Women's Macau Open 2015.

=== October ===
- 1 October - 66th National Day of the People's Republic of China ceremony at Macau Tower.
- 27 October - The opening of Studio City in Cotai.

=== December ===
- 17 December - The opening of St. Regis Macao in Cotai.
