= 2016 in Macau =

- Decades: 1990s; 2000s; 2010s; 2020s
- See also: Other events of 2016; History of Macau

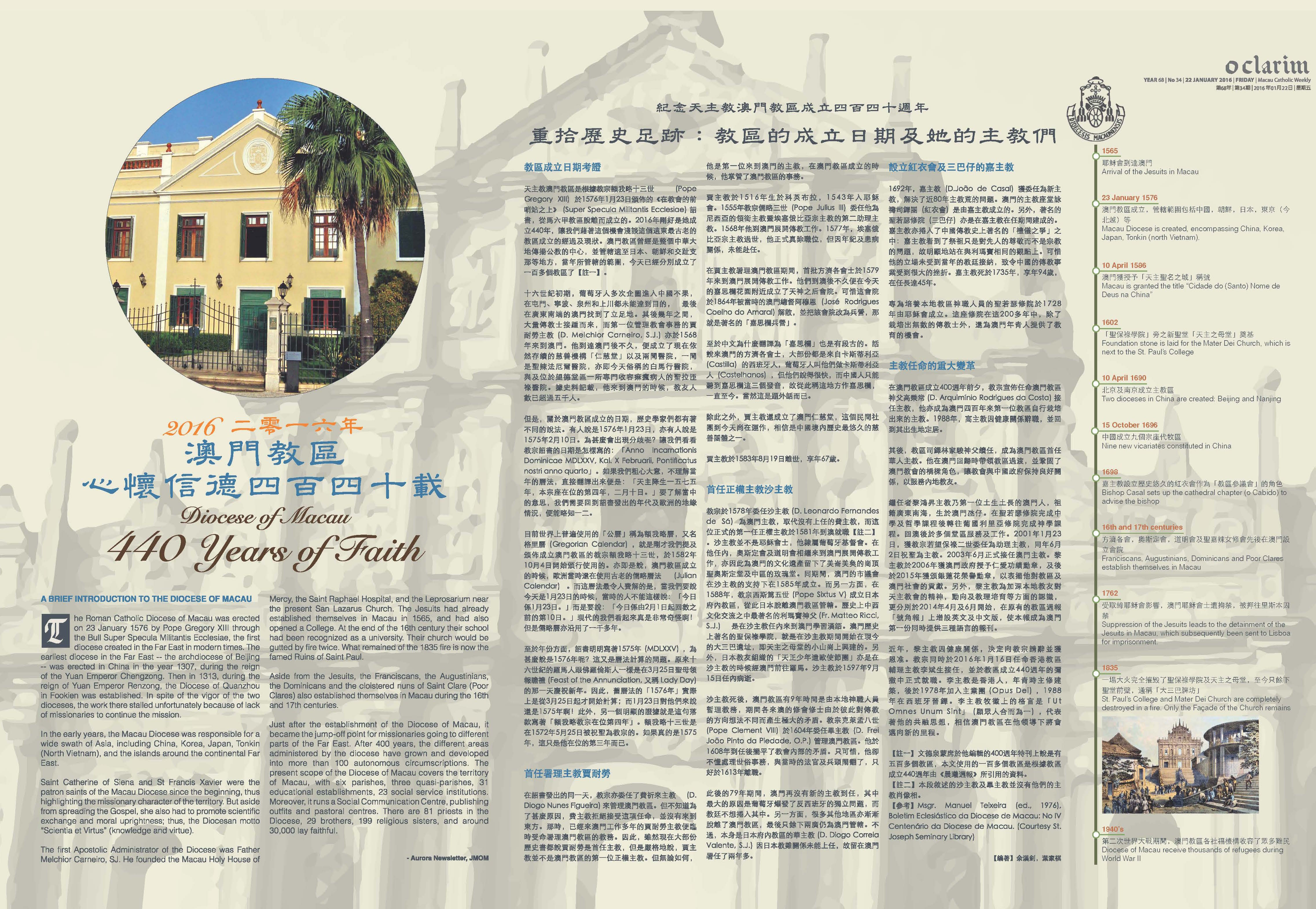
Diocese of Macau 440th Anniversary in 2016

Events from the year 2016 in Macau, China.

== Incumbents ==
- Chief Executive: Fernando Chui
- Legislative Assembly President: Ho Iat Seng

== Events ==
- 17 March - 10th Asian Film Awards
