= 2023 in Macau =

- Decades: 2000s; 2010s; 2020s
- See also: Other events of 2023; History of Macau

Events in the year 2023 in Macau, China.

== Incumbents ==
- Chief Executive: Ho Iat Seng
- President of the Legislative Assembly: Kou Hoi In

== Events ==
- 21 April – A court in Macao sentences businessman and notorious gangster Chan Weng Lin to 14 years in prison for illegal gambling and gang-related crimes.

== Deaths ==
- 11 January – Doming Lam, 96, Macanese-born Hong Kong classical composer.
