= 2006 in Macau =

- Decades: 1980s; 1990s; 2000s; 2010s; 2020s
- See also: Other events of 2006; History of Macau

Events from the year 2006 in Macau, China.

== Incumbents ==
- Chief Executive - Edmund Ho
- President of the Legislative Assembly - Susana Chou

== Events ==
=== January ===
- 23 January - Macau became the world's largest gambling center, surpassing Las Vegas Strip in the United States.

=== March ===
- 1 March - The opening of Communications Museum in Nossa Senhora de Fátima.

=== May ===
- 7 May - The opening of Museum of Taipa and Coloane History in Taipa.

=== June ===
- 3 June - 2006 Hong Kong–Macau Interport at Macau University of Science and Technology Sports Field.

=== July ===
- 19–23 July - 2006 Macau Open Badminton Championships at Tap Seac Multi-sports Pavilion.

=== September ===
- 6 September - The opening of Wynn Macau in Sé.

=== October ===
- 7–15 October - 2006 Lusophony Games at Macau Stadium.

=== December ===
- 31 December - The official opening of Macau Fisherman's Wharf in Sé.
