= 2020 in Macau =

- Decades: 2000s; 2010s; 2020s
- See also: Other events of 2020; History of Macau

Events in the year 2020 in Macau, China.

== Incumbents ==
- Chief Executive: Ho Iat Seng
- President of the Legislative Assembly: Chui Sai Cheong

== Events ==
- 22 January – The region confirmed its two first COVID-19 cases, that of a 52-year-old woman and of a 66-year-old man, both from Wuhan.
- 19 June – 300 Filipinos who were living in Macau were airlifted in an operation headed by the Philippine Consulate General of the territory.
