= 2005 in Macau =

- Decades: 1980s; 1990s; 2000s; 2010s; 2020s
- See also: Other events of 2005; History of Macau

Events from the year 2005 in Macau, China.

== Incumbents ==
- Chief Executive - Edmund Ho
- President of the Legislative Assembly - Susana Chou

== Events ==
=== June ===
- 1 June - The opening of Macau Tea Culture House in São Lázaro.

=== September ===
- 25 September - 2005 Macanese legislative election.

=== October ===
- 29 October - The start of 2005 East Asian Games.

=== November ===
- 6 November - The end of 2005 East Asian Games.

=== December ===
- 31 December - The start of trial operation of Macau Fisherman's Wharf.
