= 2013 in Macau =

- Decades: 1990s; 2000s; 2010s; 2020s
- See also: Other events of 2013; History of Macau

Events from the year 2013 in Macau, China.

== Incumbents ==
- Chief Executive - Fernando Chui
- President of the Legislative Assembly - Lau Cheok Va, Ho Iat Seng

== Events ==
=== October ===
- 17–20 October - Men's Macau Open 2013.

=== November ===
- 26 November - Start of 2013 Macau Open Grand Prix Gold at Macau Forum.

=== December ===
- 1 December - End of 2013 Macau Open Grand Prix Gold at Macau Forum.
