= 2014 in Macau =

- Decades: 1990s; 2000s; 2010s; 2020s
- See also: Other events of 2014; History of Macau

Events from the year 2014 in Macau, China.

== Incumbents ==
- Chief Executive - Fernando Chui
- President of the Legislative Assembly - Ho Iat Seng

== Events ==
=== March ===
- 27 March - 8th Asian Film Awards.

=== October ===
- 21–26 October - Women's Macau Open 2014.
- 23–26 October - Men's Macau Open 2014.

=== November ===
- 15 November - The establishment of Macau Design Centre in Nossa Senhora de Fátima.
- 25–30 November - 2014 Macau Open Grand Prix Gold at Tap Seac Multi-sports Pavilion.
