= 2021 in Macau =

- Decades: 2000s; 2010s; 2020s
- See also: Other events of 2021; History of Macau

Events in the year 2021 in Macau, China.

== Incumbents ==
- Chief Executive: Ho Iat Seng
- President of the Legislative Assembly: Kou Hoi In

== Events ==
- 4 August – Macau launches compulsory COVID-19 testing for all 680,000 people at 41 testing centres and will close all cinemas, gyms, bars, and other entertainment venues beginning midnight after the first local cases were reported in the city in more than 16 months. Four members of a family were infected with the Delta variant.
