= 2017 in Macau =

- Decades: 1990s; 2000s; 2010s; 2020s
- See also: Other events of 2017; History of Macau

Events in the year 2017 in Macau, China.

== Incumbents ==
- Chief Executive: Fernando Chui
- President of the Legislative Assembly: Ho Iat Seng

== Events ==
- 23 August - The landfall of Typhoon Hato in Macau.
- 25 August - The first deployment of People's Liberation Army Macau Garrison in Macau by cleaning the streets in the aftermath of Typhoon Hato.
