= 2012 in Macau =

- Decades: 1990s; 2000s; 2010s; 2020s
- See also: Other events of 2012; History of Macau

Events from the year 2012 in Macau, China.

== Incumbents ==
- Chief Executive - Fernando Chui
- President of the Legislative Assembly - Lau Cheok Va

== Events ==
=== April ===
- 11 April - The opening of Sands Cotai Central in Cotai.

=== June ===
- 16 June - 2012 Hong Kong–Macau Interport at Macau Stadium.

=== September ===
- 20 September - The opening of Sheraton Macao Hotel, Cotai Central in Cotai.

=== October ===
- 18–21 October - Men's Macau Open 2012.

=== November ===
- 27 November - The start of 2012 Macau Open Grand Prix Gold at Macau Forum.

=== December ===
- 2 December - The end of 2012 Macau Open Grand Prix Gold at Macau Forum.
