= 2022 in Macau =

- Decades: 2000s; 2010s; 2020s
- See also: Other events of 2022; History of Macau

Events in the year 2022 in Macau, China.

== Incumbents ==
- Chief Executive: Ho Iat Seng
- President of the Legislative Assembly: Kou Hoi In

== Events ==
- 21 June – Authorities in Macau place a casino and hotel with more than 700 people inside under lockdown due to an outbreak of COVID-19 in the territory.
- 11 July – Macau closes all of its casinos in order to contain an outbreak of COVID-19 in the city.
- 17-20 November – 2022 Macau Grand Prix

== Sports ==
- 2022 Liga de Elite
