= 2010 in Macau =

- Decades: 1990s; 2000s; 2010s; 2020s
- See also: Other events of 2010; History of Macau

Events from the year 2010 in Macau, China.

== Incumbents ==
- Chief Executive - Fernando Chui
- President of the Legislative Assembly - Lau Cheok Va

== Events ==
=== January ===
- 16 January - The opening of new building of Liaison Office of the Central People's Government in the Macao Special Administrative Region in Sé.

=== March ===
- 28 March - Viva Macau ceased from operation.

=== May ===
- 1 May - 2010 Macau labour protest

=== June ===
- 19–20 June - 2010 East Asian Judo Championships at Tap Seac Multi-sports Pavilion.
- 20 June - 2010 Hong Kong–Macau Interport at Macau Stadium.
- 29 June - The Mandarin Oriental, Macau at One Central opens.

=== September ===
- 15 September - The premier of The House of Dancing Water.
- 16 September - The inauguration of new road access to Coloane A Power Station.

=== December ===
- 20 December - 2010 Macau transfer of sovereignty anniversary protest
