= 2003 in Macau =

- Decades: 1980s; 1990s; 2000s; 2010s; 2020s
- See also: Other events of 2003; History of Macau

Events from the year 2003 in Macau, China.

== Incumbents ==
- Chief Executive - Edmund Ho
- President of the Legislative Assembly - Susana Chou

== Events ==
=== March ===
- 21 March - The opening of Heritage Exhibition of a Traditional Pawnshop Business in Sé.
- 28 March - The inauguration of Macau Olympic Aquatic Centre in Taipa.

=== April ===
- 8 April - The inauguration of Coloane B Power Station in Coloane.
