= 2018 in Macau =

- Decades: 1990s; 2000s; 2010s; 2020s
- See also: Other events of 2018; History of Macau

Events from the year 2018 in Macau, China.

== Incumbents ==
- Chief Executive: Fernando Chui
- President of the Legislative Assembly: Ho Iat Seng
