= 2007 in Macau =

- Decades: 1980s; 1990s; 2000s; 2010s; 2020s
- See also: Other events of 2007; History of Macau

Events from the year 2007 in Macau, China.

== Incumbents ==
- Chief Executive - Edmund Ho
- President of the Legislative Assembly - Susana Chou

== Events ==
=== February ===
- 11 February - The opening of Grand Lisboa in Sé.

=== May ===
- 1 May - 2007 Macau labour protest.
- 12 May - The opening of Crown Macau in Taipa.

=== June ===
- 10 June - 2007 Hong Kong–Macau Interport.

=== October ===
- 26 October - The start of 2007 Asian Indoor Games.

=== November ===
- 3 November - The end of 2007 Asian Indoor Games.

=== December ===
- 18 December - The opening of MGM Grand Macau in Sé.
- 20 December - 2007 Macau transfer of sovereignty anniversary protest.
