= 2009 in Macau =

- Decades: 1980s; 1990s; 2000s; 2010s; 2020s
- See also: Other events of 2009; History of Macau

Events from the year 2009 in Macau, China.

== Incumbents ==
- Chief Executive - Edmund Ho, Fernando Chui
- President of the Legislative Assembly - Susana Chou, Lau Cheok Vá

== Events ==
=== June ===
- 1 June - The opening of City of Dreams in Cotai.

=== July ===
- 26 July - 2009 Macanese Chief Executive election

=== September ===
- 20 September - The opening of L'Arc Casino in Sé.

=== December ===
- 20 December - Fernando Chui took office as the second Chief Executive of Macau.
- 26 December - The first showing of Macau International Movie Festival.
