= 2011 in Macau =

- Decades: 1990s; 2000s; 2010s; 2020s
- See also: Other events of 2011; History of Macau

Events from the year 2011 in Macau, China.

== Incumbents ==
- Chief Executive - Fernando Chui
- President of the Legislative Assembly - Lau Cheok Va

== Events ==
=== May ===
- 15 May - The opening of Galaxy Macau in Cotai.

=== July ===
- 4 July - The renaming of Taipei Economic and Cultural Center in Macau to Taipei Economic and Cultural Office in Macau.
- 19 July - The official opening of Taipei Economic and Cultural Office in Macau in Sé.
