= Yao Mou In =

Macau Chinese artist (born 2000)

- 姚慕然
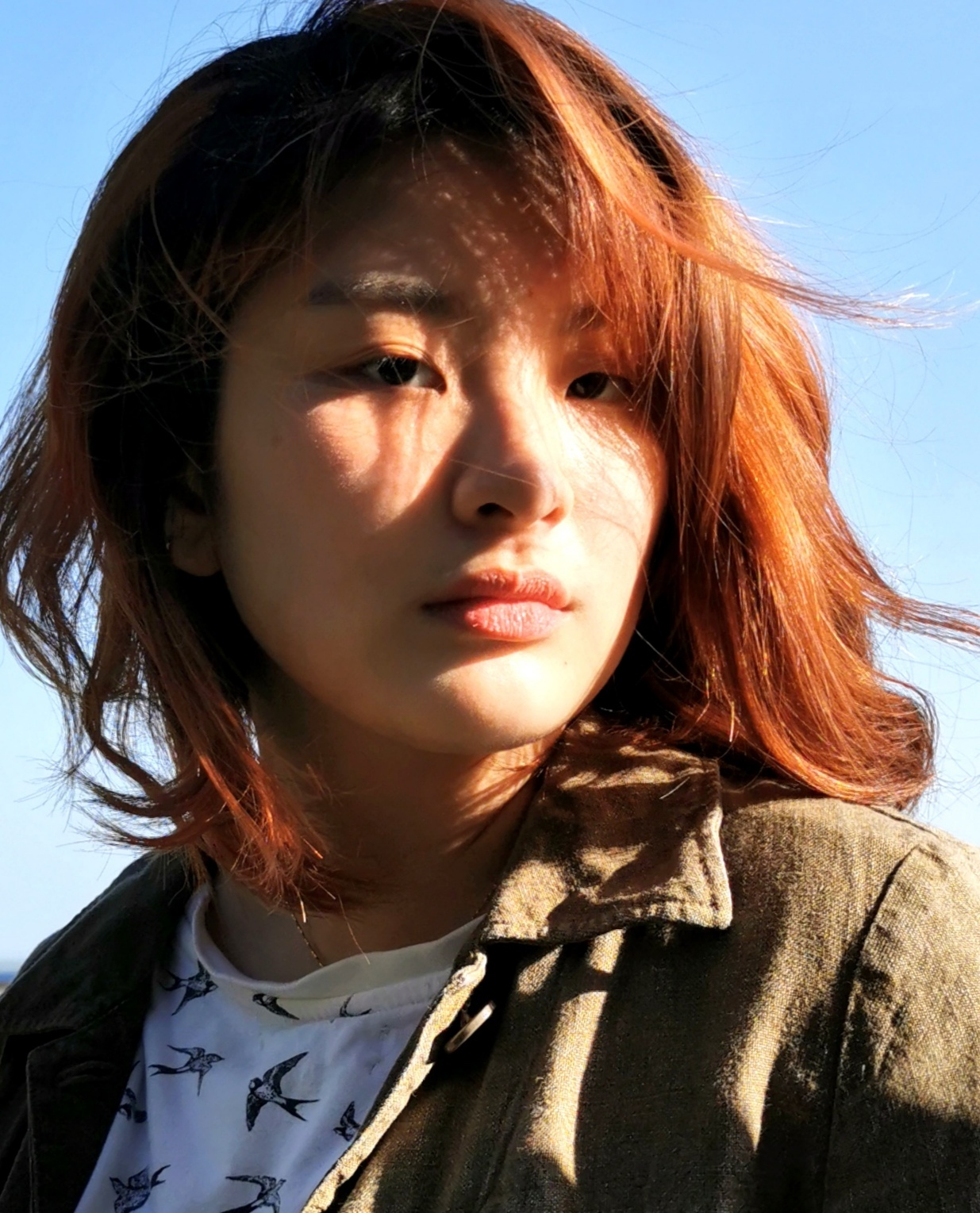
- Yao in 2019
- Born: Yao Mou In; 2000 (age 25–26); Macau, China
- Other names: Yao Muran, Sofia Yao
- Education: Rhode Island School of Design (BFA); Kellogg College, Oxford (MFA)
- Occupation: Artist
- Website: https://yaomouin.com/

Yao Mou In (Chinese: 姚慕然; pinyin: Yáo Mù Rán; Wade–Giles: Yao^{2} Mu^{4} Jan^{2}; born 2000), also known as Yao Muran or Sofia Yao, is a Macau-Chinese mixed-media painter, sculptor and video artist.

== Early life and education ==
Yao Mou In was born in Macau, China, in 2000 to a family of Beijing emigrants. Her father named her for the Song dynasty cí 'The Lantern Festival', by Xin Qiji, in which mòrán is used to describe the epiphanic recognition of a lover.

Yao was educated in Macau at a Roman Catholic girls' school until the age of 15. During this time she encountered Vincent Van Gogh's painting Café Terrace at Night (1888) which she has since cited as an early artistic inspiration. In 2019, she enrolled as a Bachelor of Fine Arts (BFA) student at New York University (NYU) before transferring to the Rhode Island School of Design (RISD), graduating in 2023 with a BFA in Glass and Painting. In 2025, she matriculated at the University of Oxford where she was enrolled at the Ruskin School of Art, reading for a Master of Fine Arts (MFA) degree.

== Work ==
=== Practice ===
In 2025, Yao was an artist-in-residence with the organisation AIR 3331 in Tokyo, Japan. There she researched shunga, traditional Japanese woodblock prints depicting erotic scenes, and its influence on doujinshi—contemporary popular print culture, often pornographic in nature. Yao also took inspiration from Eiji Ōtsuka's 2004 essay 'An Intellectual History of "Otaku": A Study of the 1980s' [「おたく」の精神史―一九八〇年代論] in which Ōtsuka, a novelist and anthropologist, explores the rise of otaku culture following the Japanese economic miracle; as well as the magazine Hey! Buddy, a now out-of-print publication which covered lolicon. Yao's work more generally responds to the culture of finding characters drawn in the style of anime or manga attractive, a feeling referred to as moe in Japanese.

=== Film ===
In 2026, Yao's short film A Perfect Shade of Pink premiered at the Ultimate Picture Palace (UPP), Oxford, as part of a limited theatrical release where it was shown before screenings of Raoul Peck's Orwell: 2+2=5 (2025). Yao described the film as a 'pig's soliloquy'; and is a collaboration with the composer Richard Meehan.

== Exhibitions ==
- Macau New Woman Contemporary Art Exhibition (Macau: Mong-Ha Villas, 2019)
- Undergraduate Student Art Organization Show (New York: The Commons and Rosenberg Gallery, 2019)
- Art Macao: Macao International Art Biennale (Macau: Macao Museum, 2021)
- Identity as Context, Memory as Content (Providence: David Winton Bell Gallery, 2022)
- The Space In-between (Providence: RISD Memorial Hall, 2023)
- Bliss Information (Providence: Gelman Gallery, 2023)
- What I Felt For You Was Love (Vancouver: 603 Powell St, 2023)
- Two Kilometers Away from the Chongqing Belt Express (Chongqing: Luo Zhongli Art Museum, 2023)
- Thin Sheets of Needs (Shanghai: Museum of Contemporary Art Shanghai, 2024)
- Unweave a Rainbow (Shanghai: MadeIn Gallery, 2024)
- Shuttlebus (Chongqing: Northwards Xu, 2024)
- Here and Now (Lisbon: Community of Portuguese Language Countries, 2024)
- Growth in Motion (Shanghai: ShanghART Gallery, 2024)
- Tides/Submerged Visions (Shanghai: Suhe Haus, 2025)
- Glorious Ashes (Chongqing: 59 Hubin East Rd, 2025)
- Arabesque (Chicago: Hard Boiled Gallery, 2025)
- Forget Your Body (Oxford: Dolphin Gallery, 2025)
- The 22^{nd} Century (Guangzhou: 5+1 Gallery, 2025)

== Awards ==
- Programa de Concessão de Subsídios para Realização de Estudos Artísticos e Culturais (Government of Macau Special Administrative Region, 2021).
- Florence Leif Scholarship (Rhode Island School of Design, 2021).
- Monika Tesarova Award (Kellogg College, Oxford, 2026).

== Select bibliography ==
- Yao, Mou In (2026). "Gochujang Blues" (PDF). Art Review Oxford (14): 3–9.
