= Kwong Tai Middle School =

Private school in Macau

Chinese name
- Traditional Chinese: 澳門廣大中學
- Simplified Chinese: 澳门广大中学
Transcriptions
Standard Mandarin
- Hanyu Pinyin: Àomén Guǎngdà Zhōngxué
Yue: Cantonese
- Jyutping: ou3 mun4*2 gwong2 daai6 zung1 hok6

Portuguese name
- Portuguese: Escola Kwong Tai

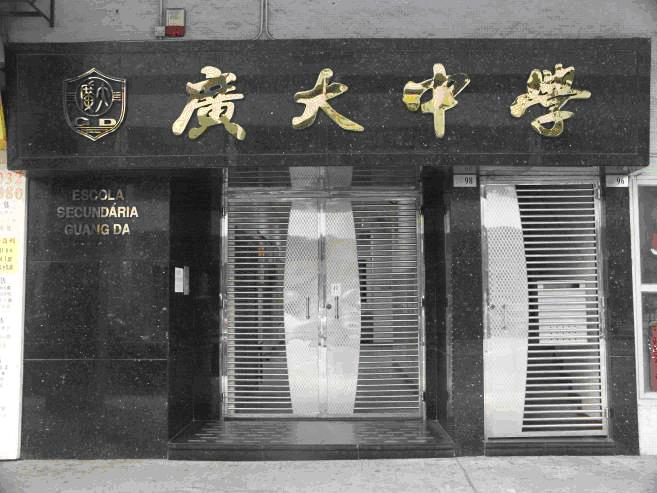
Secondary school entrance, branch campus at Luen San Square (聯薪廣場)

Kwong Tai Middle School or Guang Da Middle School (Portuguese: Escola Kwong Tai, Chinese: 澳門廣大中學) is a private school in Macau, serving pupils in preschool through secondary school. It has a main campus in Nossa Senhora de Fátima parish and a branch campus in Santo António parish.
