= Museum of Sacred Art and Crypt =

Museum in Santo António, Macau, China

- 天主教藝術博物館與墓室; Museu de Arte Sacra e Cripta
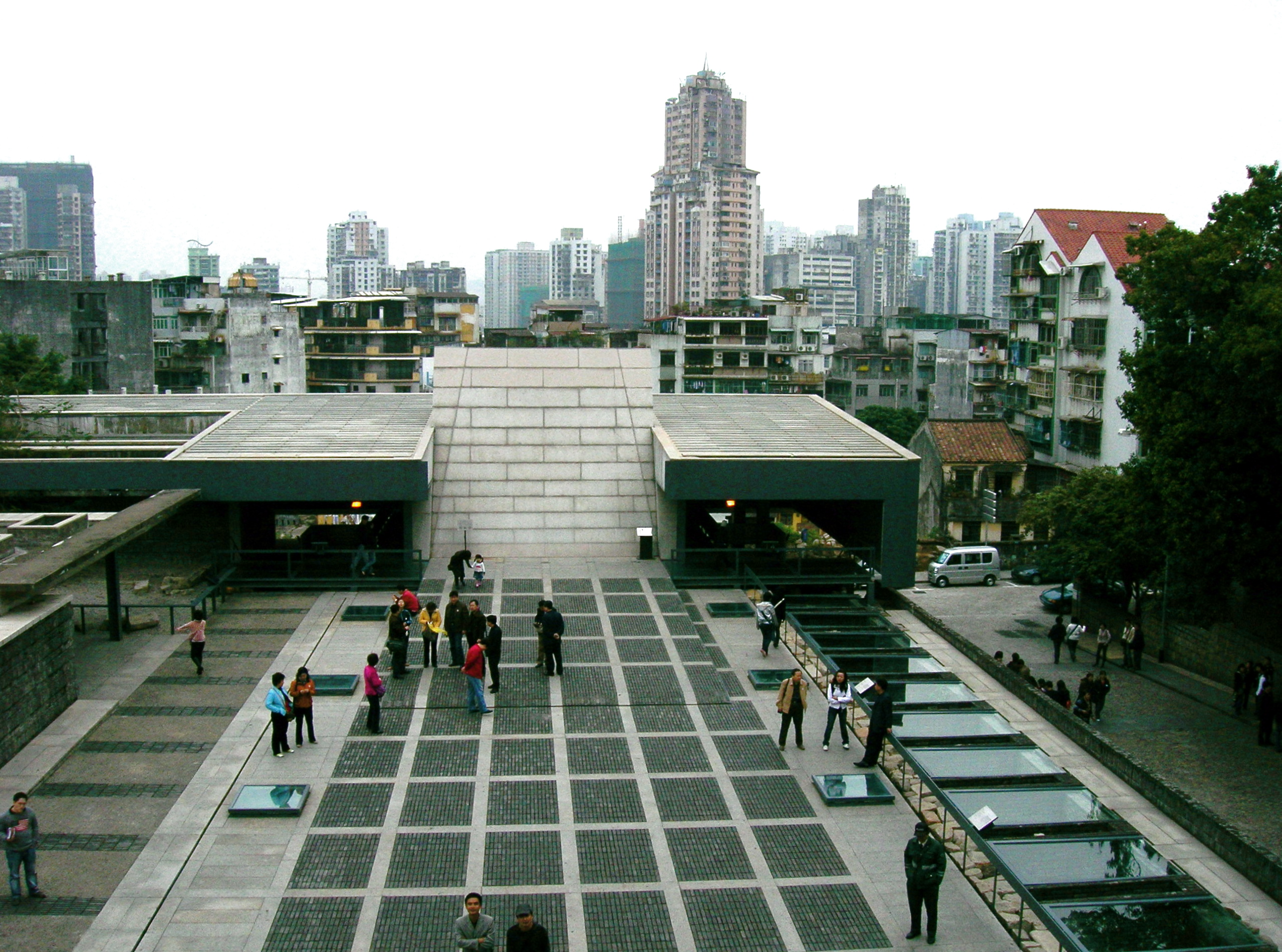
- Established: 23 October 1996
- Location: Santo António, Macau, China
- Coordinates: 22°12′11.8″N 113°33′17.6″E
- Type: museum
- Website: Official website

Museum of Sacred Art and Crypt

Chinese name
- Traditional Chinese: 天主教藝術博物館與墓室
- Simplified Chinese: 天主教艺术博物馆与墓室
Transcriptions
Standard Mandarin
- Hanyu Pinyin: Tiānzhǔjiào Yìshù Bówùguǎn yǔ Mùshì
Yue: Cantonese
- Jyutping: tin1 zyu2 gaau3 ngai6 seot6 bok3 mat6 gun2 jyu5 mou6 sat1

Portuguese name
- Portuguese: Museu de Arte Sacra e Cripta

The Museum of Sacred Art and Crypt (Chinese: 天主教藝術博物館與墓室; Portuguese: Museu de Arte Sacra e Cripta) is a public museum in Santo António, Macau, China.

== History ==
The museum was constructed at the former site of the College of the Mother of God and Church of Saint Paul. It was inaugurated on 23 October 1996.

== Exhibitions ==
The museum exhibits objects of high historical and artistic value from different churches and convents of Macau. The crypt exhibits granite rock at the center of its area where it lies a tomb with walls decorated with Japanese and Vietnamese martyrs relics.

== See also ==
- List of museums in Macau
