= 2004 Hong Kong–Macau Interport =

The 60th Hong Kong–Macau Interport was held in Macau on 11 June 2004. Hong Kong captured the champion by winning 2-1.

== Squads ==
=== Hong Kong ===
Hong Kong was represented by its under-20 team.

- Directors: Martin Hong, Lawrence Yu Kam-kee
- Coach: Lai Sun Cheung
- Goalkeeper coach: Chu Kwok Kuen
- Assistant coach: Chan Hiu Ming
- Physio: Lui Yat Hong

No.	Pos.	Player	Date of birth (age)	Caps	Club
4	DF	Chan Man Kin			
7	DF	Leung Chi Kei			
8	MF	Lam Ka Wai	5 June 1985 (age 19)		(Hong Kong) Buler Rangers
9	FW	Yip Chi Ho	21 October 1985 (age 18)		(Hong Kong) Kitchee
10	MF	Leung Chun Pong	1 October 1986 (age 17)		Hong Kong 08
13	DF	Yau Kam Leung	26 April 1985 (age 19)		
14	FW	Leung Tsz Chun	19 May 1985 (age 19)		(Hong Kong) South China
16	DF	Leung Kam Fai	17 July 1986 (age 17)		Hong Kong 08
19	GK	Tse Tak Him	10 February 1985 (age 19)		Hong Kong 08
20	FW	Sham Kwok Keung	10 September 1985 (age 18)		(Hong Kong) Happy Valley
23	FW	Chan Siu Ki	14 July 1985 (age 19)		(Hong Kong) Kitchee
24	FW	Cheng Lai Hin	31 March 1986 (age 18)		Hong Kong 08
25	MF	Chow Ka Wa	23 April 1986 (age 18)		
	GK	Ng Yat Hoi	6 November 1986 (age 17)		
	DF	Yau Ching On			
	MF	Fung Kai Hong	25 January 1986 (age 18)		
	MF	Kwok Wing Lok	15 January 1986 (age 18)		
	MF	Chan Kin On	15 July 1986 (age 17)		

=== Macau ===
The following only shows the players played in the match.

No.	Pos.	Player	Date of birth (age)	Caps	Club
1	GK	Domingos Chan	11 September 1970 (age 33)		(Hong Kong) Sun Hei
3	DF	Wong Kuok Leong			
4	DF	若瑟			
5	DF	Lam Ka Koi			
6	MF	Geofredo Cheung	18 May 1979 (age 25)		
7	MF	Chong Kun Kan			
8	DF	美基			
9	MF	Ian Chi Pang			
10	MF	亞文度			
11	FW	Cheang Chon Man			
12	FW	Lei Fu Weng			
13	DF	Lam Ka Pou			
15	FW	鄭正揚			
16	FW	巴路士			

== Results ==
11 June 2004

Macau	1 - 2	Hong Kong
Chong Kun Kan 66'	(Report) (in Chinese)	Leung Tsz Chun 10'; Chan Siu Ki 68'

Macau
