= 2024 in Macau =

- Decades: 2000s; 2010s; 2020s
- See also: Other events of 2024; History of Macau

Events in the year 2024 in Macau, China.

== Incumbents ==
- Chief Executive: Ho Iat Seng (until 20 December); Sam Hou Fai (since 20 December)
- President of the Legislative Assembly: Kou Hoi In

== Events ==
- 21 August: Chief Executive Ho Iat Seng announces that he would not seek another term in office in elections scheduled for October, citing ill health.
- 13 October: Sam Hou Fai, the former president of the Court of Final Appeal of Macau, is elected as the new Chief Executive of Macau, the first to have been born in mainland China.
- 20 December: Sam Hou Fai is inaugurated as Chief Executive of Macau.

== Holidays ==
- 1 January – New Year's Day
- 9 February – Chinese New Year's Eve
- 10 February – Chinese New Year
- 29 March - Good Friday
- 30 March - Holy Saturday
- 4 April - Qingming Festival
- 1 May - International Workers' Day
- 15 May - Buddha's Birthday
- 10 June - Dragon Boat Festival
- 17 September – Mid-Autumn Festival
- 1–2 October – National Day
- 11 October – Double Ninth Festival
- 8 December – Immaculate Conception
- 20 December – Macau S.A.R. Establishment Day
- 22 December – Winter Solstice Festival
- 24 December – Christmas Eve
- 25 December - Christmas Day
- 31 December – New Year's Eve
