= Fai Chi Kei =

Coordinates: 22°12′21.10″N 113°32′27.44″E

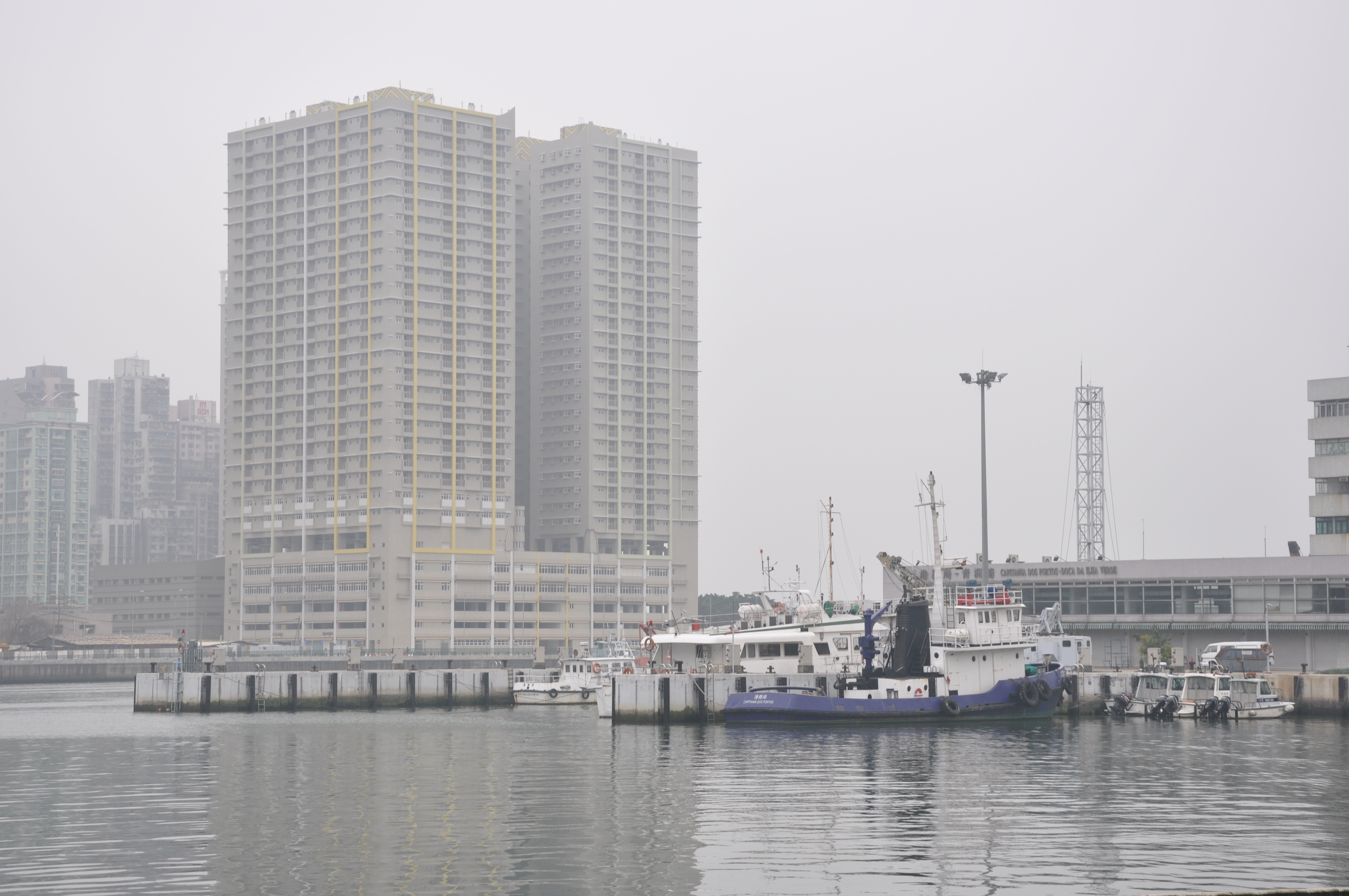
- Fai Chi Kei
- Chinese: 筷子基
Transcriptions
Standard Mandarin
- Hanyu Pinyin: Kuàizijī
Yue: Cantonese
- Jyutping: faai3 zi2 gei1

Fai Chi Kei (Chinese: 筷子基) is a place located in Nossa Senhora de Fátima, Macau. It was originally a sandbank near the peninsula. The area is bounded by Rua da Bacia Sul, Avenida Marginal do Lam Mau, Rua da Doca Seca and Rua Sul do Patane.

== History ==
The quarter was constructed in there in 1932, then known as the "May 28th Houses" in commemoration of the Portuguese Reformation Day.

The two-storey buildings stood in two lines on top of rectangular foundations with chopsticks shape, hence the name "Fai Chi Kei" in Cantonese.

Later, the original houses were rebuilt to become a public rental housing project surrounded by reclaimed land. Designed by Manuel Vicente, the complex was supposed to be four buildings, but instead two 6-storey complexes were built with an inner courtyard.

== Redevelopment ==
The housing project has since disappeared and demolished to make way for The Praia, a large residential development.

== Healthcare ==
The Macau government operates a public health centre in Santo António, near Bairro Fai Chi Kei.
