= 2025 in Macau =

- Decades: 2000s; 2010s; 2020s
- See also: Other events of 2025; History of Macau

Events in the year 2025 in Macau, China.

== Incumbents ==
- Chief Executive: Sam Hou Fai
- President of the Legislative Assembly: Kou Hoi In

== Events ==
- 30 July – Au Kam San, a former member of the Legislative Assembly of Macau, is arrested on charges of colluding with outside forces to disrupt the 2024 Macanese Chief Executive election, promote hatred against the Chinese and Macanese governments and trigger adverse reactions by foreign countries against Macau in violation of the Macau National Security Law.
- 14 September – 2025 Macanese legislative election.

== Holidays ==
- 1 January – New Year's Day
- 29 February – Chinese New Year's Eve
- 30–31 January – Chinese New Year
- 4 April - Qingming Festival
- 18 April - Good Friday
- 19 April - Holy Saturday
- 1 May - International Workers' Day
- 5 May - Buddha's Birthday
- 31 May - Dragon Boat Festival
- 1–2 October – National Day
- 7 October – Mid-Autumn Festival
- 29 October – Double Ninth Festival
- 2 November – All Souls' Day
- 8 December – Immaculate Conception
- 20 December – Macau S.A.R. Establishment Day
- 21 December – Winter Solstice Festival
- 24 December – Christmas Eve
- 25 December - Christmas Day
- 31 December – New Year's Eve

== Deaths ==
- 22 January – Vasco Joaquim Rocha Vieira, 85, last Portuguese governor of Macau (1992–1999).
