= 1998 in Macau =

Events from the year 1998 in Portuguese Macau.

== Incumbents ==
- Governor - Vasco Joaquim Rocha Vieira

== Events ==
=== April ===
- 18 April - The inauguration of the Museum of Macau in Santo António.
