= Lam Ka Koi =

Macau footballer

Personal information
- Date of birth: 6 January 1972 (age 54)
- Place of birth: Macau, China
- Height: 1.78 m (5 ft 10 in)
- Position: Defender

Senior career*
Years	Team	Apps	(Gls)
1996–2003	C.D. Monte Carlo		
2003–2011	G.D. Lam Pak		

International career
1997–2007	Macau	14	(0)
- * Club domestic league appearances and goals

Lam Ka Koi (林家駒; born 6 January 1972) is a former footballer who plays as a defender for C.D. Monte Carlo and G.D. Lam Pak.
