= 2002 Hong Kong–Macau Interport =

The 58th Hong Kong Macau Interport was held in Macau on 21 April 2002. Both Hong Kong and Macau sent their Olympic teams. Hong Kong captured the champion by winning 2–0.

== Results ==
21 April 2002

Macau	0 - 2	Hong Kong
		Lo Chi Kwan 49'; Chow Man Ho 62'

Macau
