= Names of Macau =

Macau in Cantonese pronunciation (translated as 'The Macao Special Administrative Region of the People's Republic of China')

Macau in Portuguese (translated as 'The Macao Special Administrative Region of the People's Republic of China')

The Macao Special Administrative Region (Chinese: 澳門特別行政區; pinyin: Àomén Tèbié Xíngzhèngqū; Portuguese: Região Administrativa Especial de Macau; [abbreviated as: RAEM]), commonly known as Macau or Macao (simplified Chinese: 澳门; traditional Chinese: 澳門; pinyin: Àomén, or informally as 馬交 Mǎjiāo) is one of the two special administrative regions (SARs) of the China (PRC), along with Hong Kong.

== Portuguese name ==
=== Legend ===
The name Macau (Portuguese pronunciation: [mɐˈkaw]) is thought to be derived from the Templo de A-Má (Temple of A-Ma or Ma Kok Temple) (媽閣廟, Cantonese Jyutping: Maa1 Gok3 Miu6, local pronunciation: Maa5 Gok3 Miu6 or Maa5 Gok3 Miu2), a still-existing landmark built in 1448 dedicated to the goddess Matsu - the goddess of seafarers and fishermen.

In keeping with saga, a fishing boat sailing across the sea one day found itself in an unexpected storm. Everyone on board was about to give up all hope of surviving this natural disaster when an attractive young lady, who had boarded the boat at the eleventh hour, stood up and ordered the tempest to calm down. The gale ceased and the sea became calm. The fishing boat, without further event, arrived safely at the port of Hoi Keang. The young lady walked ashore to the top of the Barra Hill where, in a glowing aura of light and fragrance; she immediately ascended into heaven. A temple was built on the specific location where she set foot.

Several hundred years later (circa 1513), when Portuguese sailors landed and asked the name of the place, the locals replied "媽閣" (Jyutping: "Maa1 Gok3"). The Portuguese then named the peninsula "Macao". A number of other legends exist, including a derivation from 馬交, which is more likely derived from the Portuguese name.

=== Textual evidence ===
Textual evidence points to the name "Macau" being derived from a local name 阿媽港 (Jyutping: "aa3 maa1 gong2"; lit. 'Port of A-Ma'), written as such in both Chinese and Japanese texts since the sixteenth century. The name was transcribed variously as "Amaquão" among other spellings, which is equivalent to "Amacão" (Portuguese pronunciation: [amɐˈkɐ̃w]) in sound. The corrupted "Macão" appeared in 1641, before finally losing the nasal tilde into the near-modern form of "Macao" in a 1652 Jesuit publication. The evolution to "Macau" is generally attributed to the 1911 Reforms of Portuguese orthography.

A Contemporary Spanish text used a name "Macan", pronounced similarly to "Macão". Batalha suggests that the loss of nasalization may have to do with association with the word cão (dog, devil).

== Chinese names ==
The Chinese name Aomen 澳門 (pinyin: Àomén, Cantonese: Ou3 Mun4*2 [ʔōu mǔːn]) means "Inlet Gates". The "gates" refer to two erect gate-like mountains of Nantai (Chinese: 南台; pinyin: Nántái) and Beitai (Chinese: 北台; pinyin: Běitái). Alternately, Ao may derive from Macau's previous name Heong San Ou, as it is geographically situated at "Cross' Door".

Macau is also known as:

- Hou Keng Ou (濠鏡澳 Oyster-mirror Inlet)
- Heong San Ou (香山澳 Xiangshan Ao; Fragrant-mountain Inlet)
- Lin Tou (蓮島 Liandao; Lotus Island)
- Soda Port (梳打埠)

While Ou3 Mun2 is the traditional Cantonese name of the place, it is common among the Cantonese-speaking to use the Portuguese-derived name 馬交 Maa5 Gaau1 [ma̬ː káːu].

== Duality in English ==
Two spellings of the name exist in English: "Macao", derived from the original Portuguese spelling; and "Macau", derived from the current orthography.

Dualism is visible in many English language government publications and documents, sometimes even within the same paragraph. For example, the spelling "Macao" appears on the local government's English language emblem as seen at its web portal and also at the official website of the Macao Government Tourism Office. Similarly, "Macao" is used on the Macau Special Administrative Region passport, but the government's official explanatory note on the passport spells it as "Macau". As of 2014 most English-language books use "Macau".

== Official and diplomatic status ==
There are two official versions of the Basic Law of Macau, one in Chinese and one in Portuguese. According to articles 136 and 137 of the Basic Law the place may represent itself as "中國澳門" or "Macau, China". The two names are specified in the versions of their respective languages only and not vice versa. The "unofficial" English translations from Government Printing Bureau and University of Macau adopt the "Macao" spelling throughout.

After the 1999 resumption of sovereignty the central government of China announced that Macao would be the spelling in English. The Macau authorities issued an internal circular on the matter since when government publications in English use the spelling Macao. Less commonly used is the pinyin transcription of 澳門 Aòmén, but its usage is not used officially. The decision not to adopt pinyin names after the handover to China appears to be consistent with the usual PRC policy of respecting the local linguistic traditions in the romanized version of names, as in other non-pinyin names like Lhasa, Ürümqi or Hohhot, for example. The preference for "Macao" may be explained by a similarity to 馬交 Mǎjiāo, in particular the pinyin pronunciation of "ao" is approximately as in cow; the a is much more audible than the o.

Notwithstanding the official Basic Law of Macau requirement to use "Macau, China", Macau participates in international organisations and international sport events like World Trade Organization and International Monetary Fund meetings and East Asian Games as "Macao, China".

"Macao" is also the designated name of the ISO 3166-1 country code MO, and of the top-level domain .mo.

== Historical names ==
In 1587, king Philip I of Portugal (II of Spain) promoted Macau from "Settlement or Port of the Name of God" to "City of the Name of God" (Cidade do Nome de Deus de Macau).

== Alternative names for Macau ==
Alternate Names or Name Variants for Macau Special Administrative Region (certain examples)
Language	Short Name	Formal Name
Arabic	ماكاو (Makaw)	المنطقة الإدارية الخاصة لماكاو (Almintaqat Al'iidariat Alkhasat Limakaw)
Catalan	Macau	Regió Administrativa Especial de Macau
Chinese	澳門(Aòmén) or 澳門特區 (Aòmén tèqū)	澳門特別行政區 (Aòmén tèbié xíngzhèngqū)
Czech	Macao	Zvláštní administrativní oblast Macao
Danish	Macau	Særlige Administrativ Region Macao
Dutch	Macau	Speciale Bestuurlijke Regio Macau
English (Australia)	Macau	Macau Special Administrative Region
English (Canada)	Macao	Macao Special Administrative Region
English (PRC government)	Macao	Macao Special Administrative Region
English (Singapore)	Macau	Macau Special Administrative Region
English (UK)	Macao	Macao Special Administrative Region
English (US)	Macau	Macau Special Administrative Region
French	Macao	Région Administrative Spéciale de Macao
German	Macao	Sonderverwaltungsregion Macao
Hebrew	מקאו (Makaw)	אזור מנהלי מיוחד של מקאו
Hiligaynon	Makáw	Bináhin nga may Pinasahî nga Pagpamalákad sang Makáw / Rehiyón nga Espesyál nga Adminitratíbo sang Makáw
Indonesian	Makau	Daerah Administratif Khusus Makao
Italian	Macao	Regione Amministrativa Speciale di Macao
Japanese	マカオ (Makao) / 澳門 (Makao; rare)	マカオ特別行政区 (Makao Tokubetsu Gyōsei-ku)
Kapampangan	Makau / Macau	Rehiyung Administratibung Espesyal ning Makau
Korean	마카오 (Makao) / 아오먼 (Aomeon) / 오문 (Omun)	마카오 특별 행정구 (Makao Teukbyeol Haengjeonggu)
Malay	Makau	Wilayah Pentadbiran Khas Makau
Persian	ماکائو (Mākāū)	بخش ویژه اداری ماکائو (Bakhshe Vizheye Edariye Macao)
Polish	Makau	Specjalny Region Administracyjny Makau
Portuguese	Macau	Região Administrativa Especial de Macau
Russian	Мака́о (Makao) / Аомы́нь (Aomyn')	Специальный Административный район Мака́о
Scots Gaelic	Macàthu	Sgìre Rianachd Shònraichte Macàthu
Spanish	Macao	Región Administrativa Especial de Macao
Tagalog	Makaw / Makao	Rehiyong Administratibong Espesyal ng Makaw
Turkish	Makao	Makao özel yönetim bölgesi
Vietnamese	Ma Cao	Đặc khu hành chính Ma Cao
