= 2000 Hong Kong–Macau Interport =

The 56th Hong Kong Macau Interport was held in Macau on 28 May 2000. Hong Kong captured the champion by winning 1-0.

The highlight of the match happened on the 36th minute. Lee Kin Wo of Hong Kong team was sent off by the Macanese referee Tsui Kwok Kuen(徐國權). He was unsatisfied with the judgment the referee and kicked the football to hit him. Tsui Kwok Kuen immediately fought back and hit Lee's head. They were then separated by other officials and teammates.

Tsui Kwok Kuen was penalized for a lifelong suspension of refereeing any matches organized by Associação de Futebol de Macau and any international matches. Lee Kin Wo was penalized by a suspension of one year and HKD10,000.

== Results ==
28 May 2000

Macau	0 - 1	Hong Kong
		Cheng Siu Chung 86'

Macau
