= Macao Museum =

Museum in Macau

- Museu de Macau (Portuguese) 澳門博物館 (Chinese)

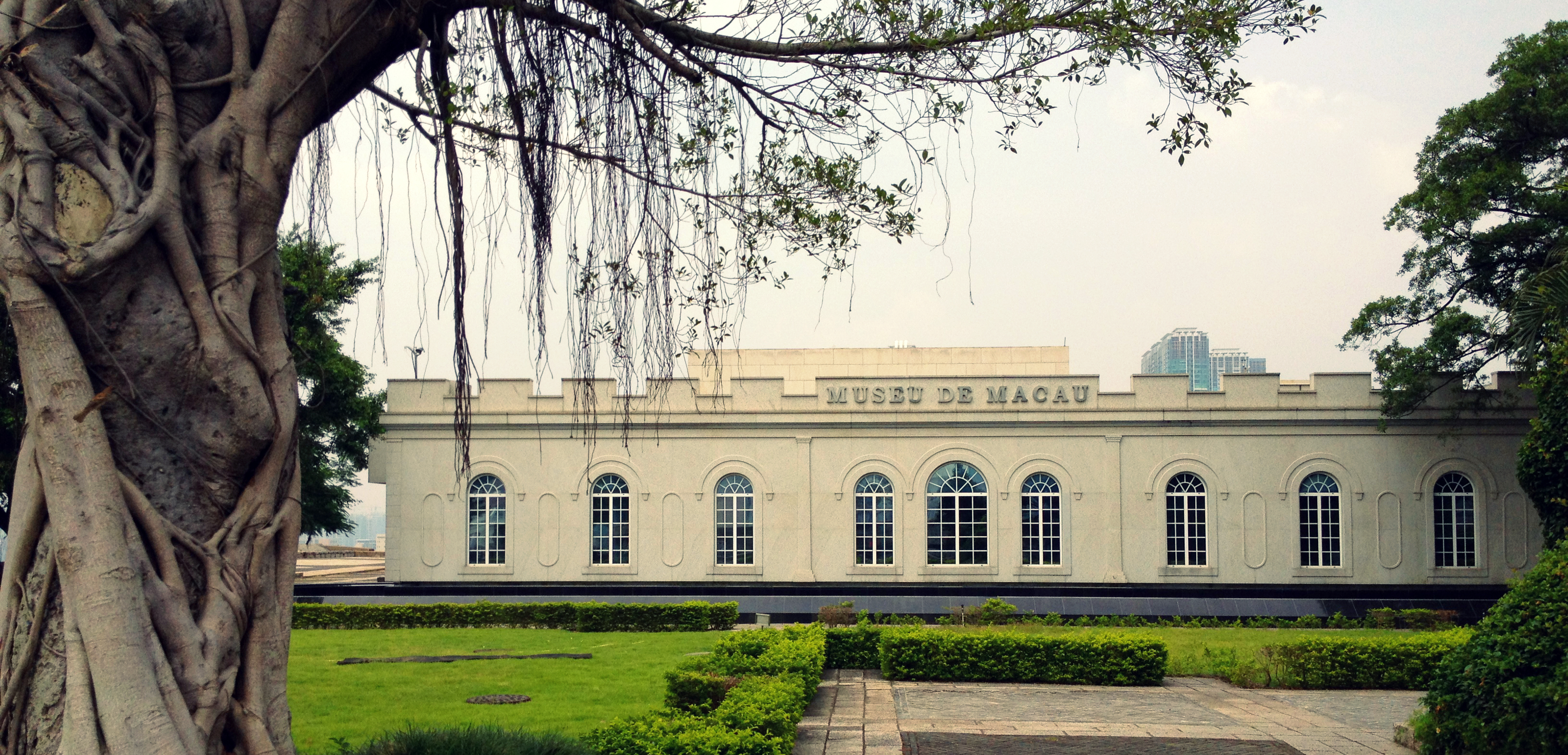
- Museum of Macau
- Established: 18 April 1998 (inaugurated)
- Location: Santo António, Macau, China
- Coordinates: 22°11′50″N 113°32′32″E
- Website: macaumuseum.gov.mo/en

Chinese Name

Chinese name
- Traditional Chinese: 澳門博物館
- Simplified Chinese: 澳门博物馆
- Jyutping: Ou^{3} mun^{4} Bok^{3} mat^{6} gun^{2}
Transcriptions
Standard Mandarin
- Hanyu Pinyin: Àomén Bówùguǎn
Yue: Cantonese
- Jyutping: Ou^{3} mun^{4} Bok^{3} mat^{6} gun^{2}

Portuguese name
- Portuguese: Museu de Macau

The Macao Museum (Chinese: 澳門博物館; Portuguese: Museu de Macau) is a public museum located on the hill of the Fortaleza do Monte in Santo António, Macau SAR. The museum presents the history of the city and territory of the former Portuguese colony of Macau, now a special administrative region of the People's Republic of China.

Planning for the museum started in April 1995, its construction began in September 1996. The museum was inaugurated on 18 April 1998. The museum building is located within the interior of the Fortaleza do Monte. Its total size is about 2,800 m^{2}, with around 2,100 m^{2} of exhibition space.

== Gallery ==
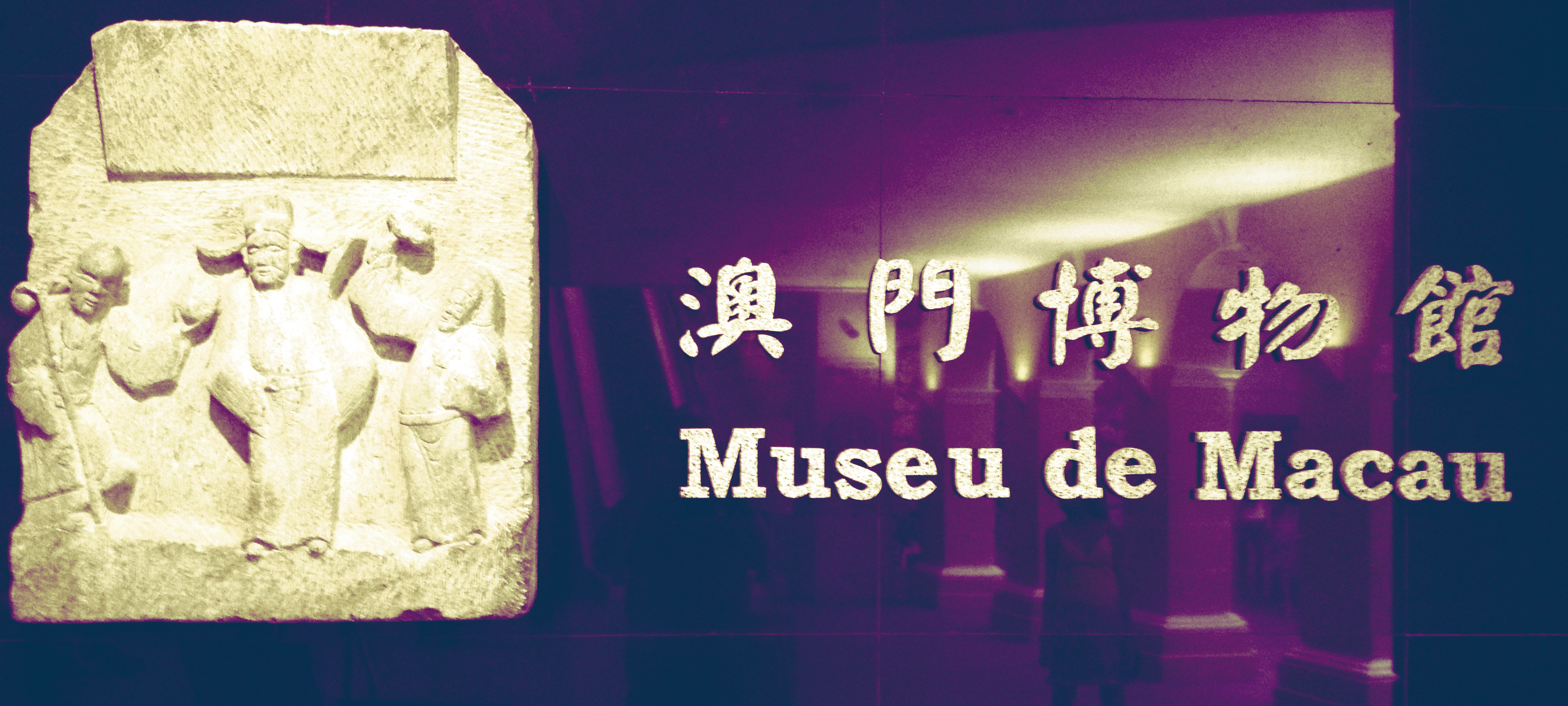
A sign at the entrance to the Macau Museum

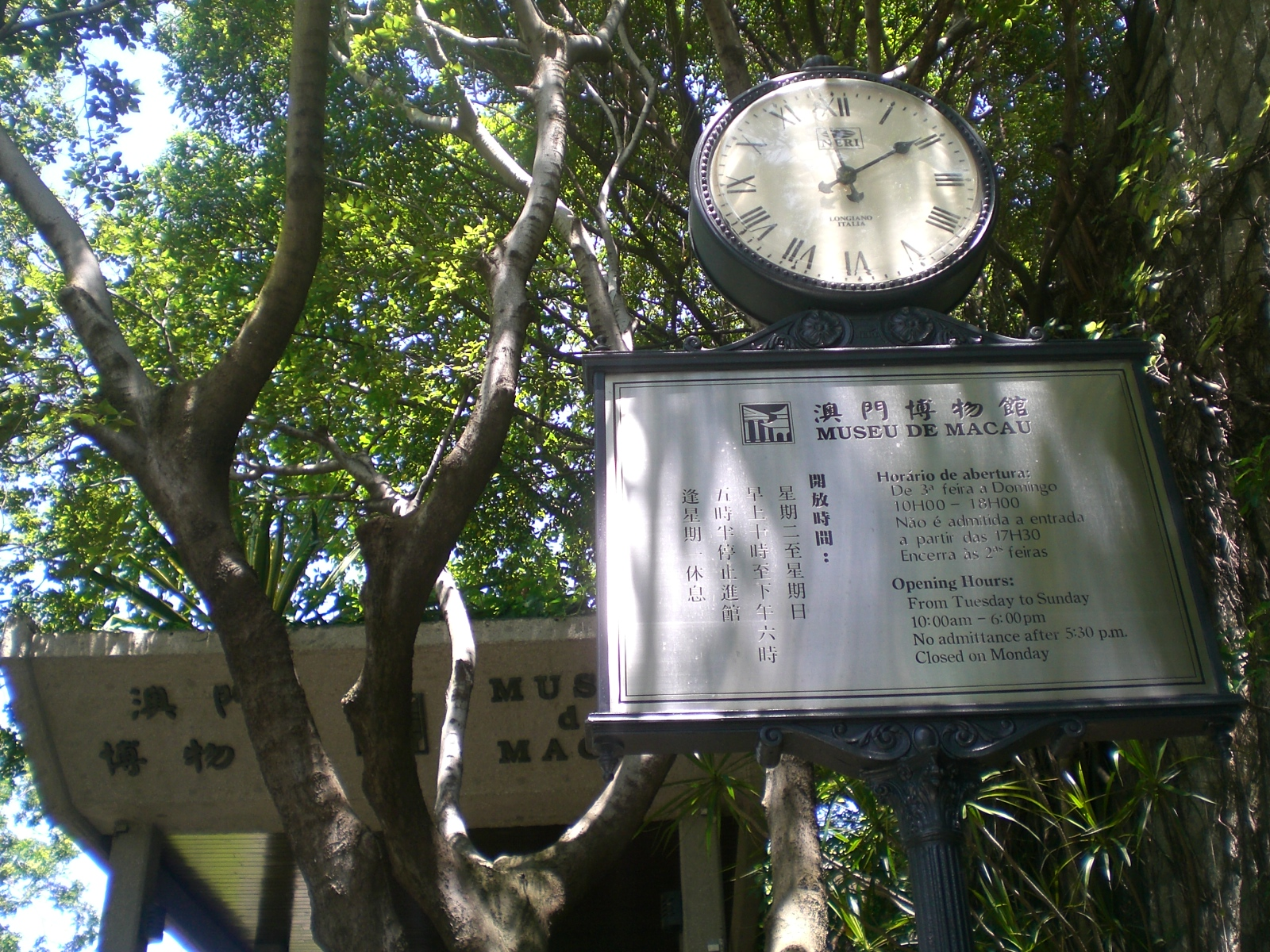
A sign outside the Macau Museum

== See also ==
- List of museums in Macau
