= 1997 in Macau =

Events from the year 1997 in Portuguese Macau.

== Incumbents ==
- Governor - Vasco Joaquim Rocha Vieira

== Events ==
- 21 March - The opening of Natural and Agrarian Museum in Coloane.
- 16 November - the 1997 Macau Grand Prix
