= Santo António, Macau =

Coordinates: 22.2009°N 113.5420°E

Santo António 花王堂區 Saint Anthony
- Freguesia
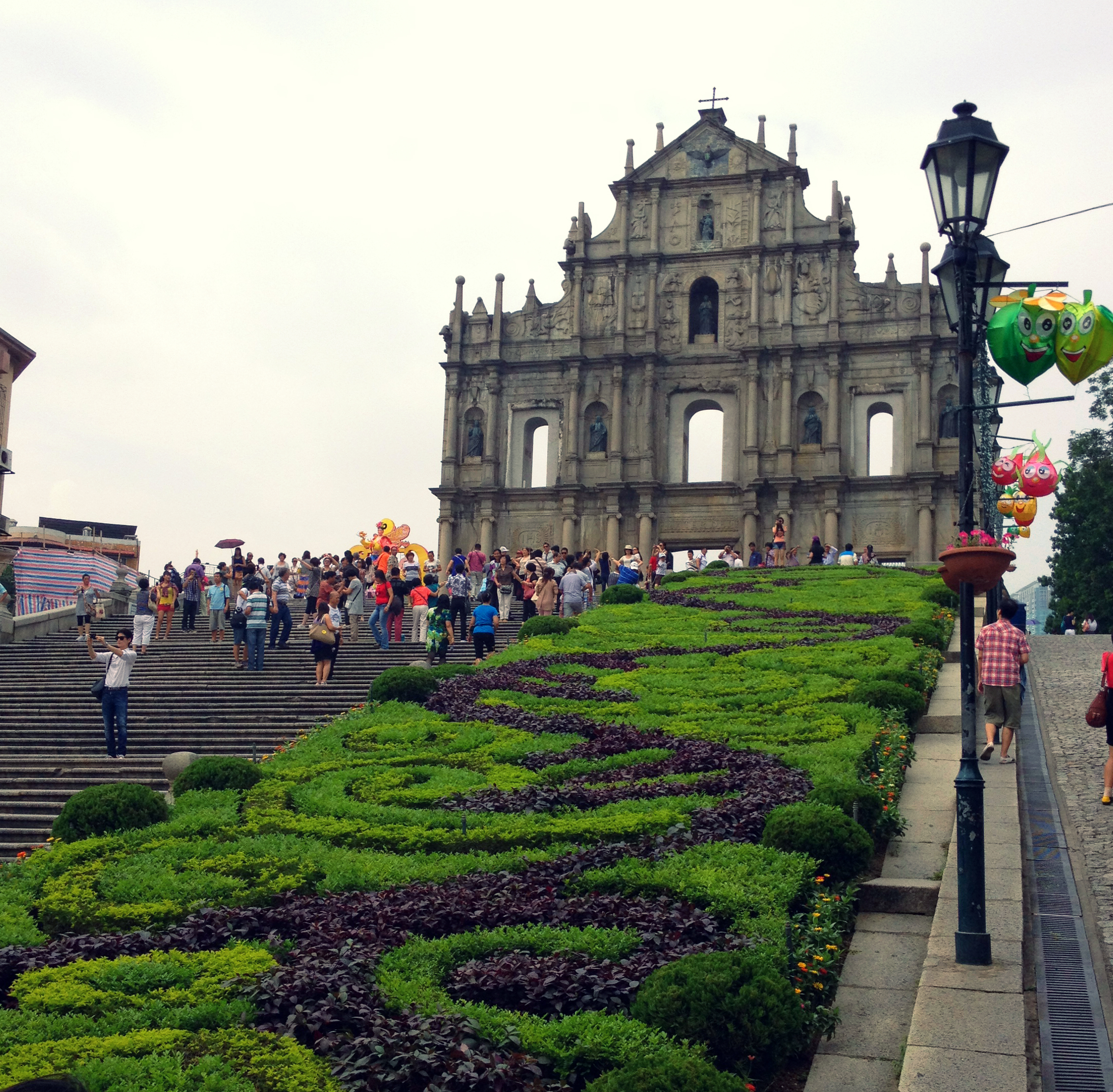
- Ruins of St. Paul's

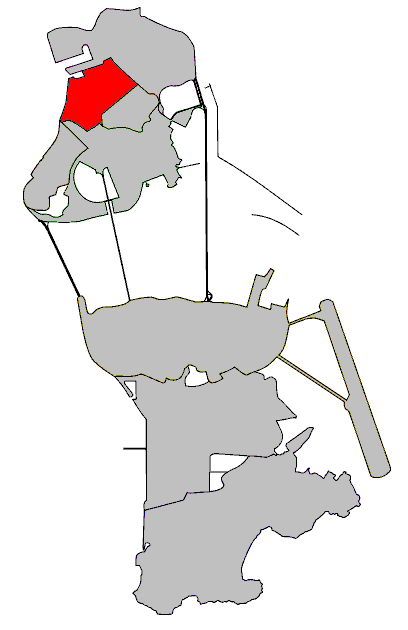
- Freguesia de Santo António in Macau
- Country: Macao

Area
  - Total: 1.1 km^{2} (0.42 sq mi)

Population (2013)
  - Total: 129,800
  - Density: 120,000/km^{2} (310,000/sq mi)
- Time zone: UTC+8 (Macau Standard)

Freguesia de Santo António

Chinese name
- Traditional Chinese: 聖安多尼堂區
- Simplified Chinese: 圣安多尼堂区
- Jyutping: Sing^{3} On^{1} Do^{1} Nei^{4} Tong^{4} Keoi^{1}
- Hanyu Pinyin: Shèng'ānduōní Tángqū
Transcriptions
Standard Mandarin
- Hanyu Pinyin: Shèng'ānduōní Tángqū
- IPA: [ʂə̂ŋˈántwónǐ tʰǎŋtɕʰý]
Yue: Cantonese
- Jyutping: Sing^{3} On^{1} Do^{1} Nei^{4} Tong^{4} Keoi^{1}
- IPA: [siŋ˧ʔɔːn˥tɔː˥nei˧˩ tʰɔːŋ˧˩kʰɵy˥]

Alternative name
- Traditional Chinese: 花王堂區
- Simplified Chinese: 花王堂区
- Jyutping: Faa^{1} Wong^{4} Tong^{4} Koe^{1}
- Hanyu Pinyin: Huāwáng Tángqū
- Literal meaning: the gardener's parish
Transcriptions
Standard Mandarin
- Hanyu Pinyin: Huāwáng Tángqū
Yue: Cantonese
- Jyutping: Faa^{1} Wong^{4} Tong^{4} Koe^{1}
- IPA: [fáːwɔ̏ːŋ tʰɔ̏ːŋkʰœ́ː]

Portuguese name
- Portuguese: Freguesia de Santo António

Santo António is a civil parish in the western portion of the Macau Peninsula of Macau. It has the highest population density in Macau (98,776 persons per km²).

This parish was one of five in the former Municipality of Macau, one of Macau's two municipalities that were abolished on 31 December 2001 by Law No. 17/2001, following the 1999 transfer of sovereignty over Macau from Portugal to China. While their administrative functions have since been removed, these parishes are still retained nominally.

It is north of the parish of Sé, south of Nossa Senhora de Fátima parish, west of São Lázaro parish, and east of the Inner Harbor (Porto Interior).

== Description ==
The entire area is reclaimed from the sea.

Population statistics as of 2006:

- Area: 1.1. km² (16.4% of the peninsula)
- Population: 109,000 (31.7% of the peninsular population)

It includes:

- Sha Kong (沙崗)
- San Kio (新橋)
- Patane (沙梨頭)

== Hotels ==
- Sofitel Macau At Ponte 16

== Healthcare ==
The parish houses a private hospital, Kiang Wu Hospital.

The Macau government operates the Fai Chi Kei Health Center (Centro de Saúde Macau Norte, 筷子基衛生中心) in Santo António, near Bairro Fai Chi Kei.

== Education ==
=== Primary and secondary schools ===
All primary and secondary schools in Santo António are private.

In the tuition-free school network:
- Colégio Mateus Ricci: One secondary campus and one primary/kindergarten campus
- Kwong Tai Middle School branch campus
- Sacred Heart Canossian College (Colégio do Sagrado Coração de Jesus; 嘉諾撒聖心中學) - Preschool through secondary school
- Sacred Heart Canossian College English section - Primary and secondary school
- Hou Kong Middle School Macau (Escola Hou Kong; 濠江中學) kindergarten and primary school campuses
- Escola Shá Lei Tau Cham Son (沙梨頭浸信學校) - Preschool and primary school
- Saint John de Brito School (Escola São João de Brito; 庇道學校) - Primary and secondary school
- Tong Nam School (Escola Tong Nam; 東南學校) - Preschool through senior high school
- Escola da Sagrada Família (聖家學校) - Preschool and primary school
- The Workers' Children High School (Escola para Filhos e Irmãos dos Operários; 勞工子弟學校) - Santo António - Operated by the Union for Development

Not in the tuition-free network:
- Chan Sui Ki Perpetual Help College (Branch) (Colégio Perpétuo Socorro Chan Sui Ki (Sucursal); 母佑會陳瑞祺永援中學(分校)) - Preschool and primary school

Former schools:

Tuition-free network:
- Escola do Santíssimo Rosário - Preschool through junior high school

=== Public libraries ===
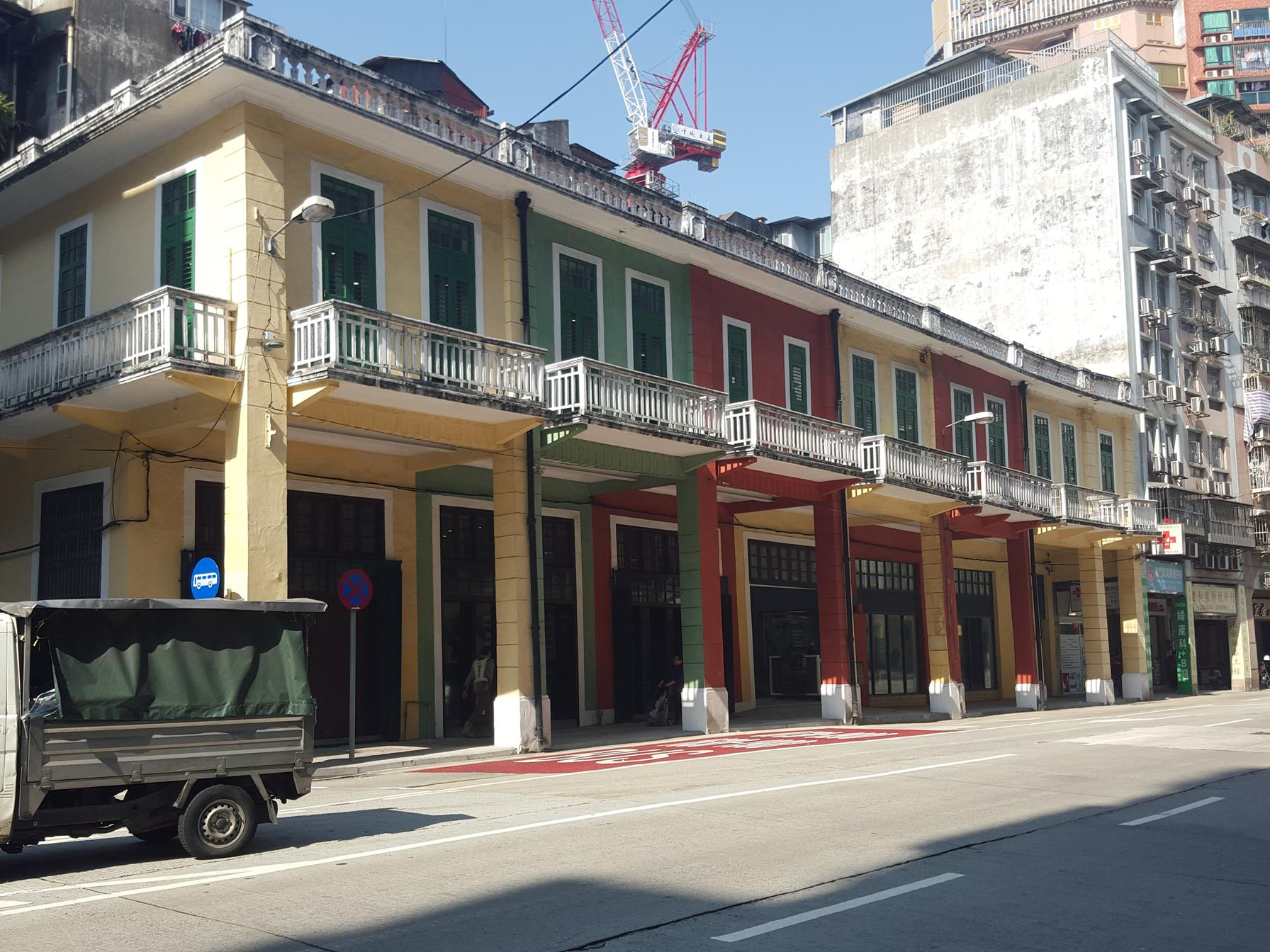
Patane Library

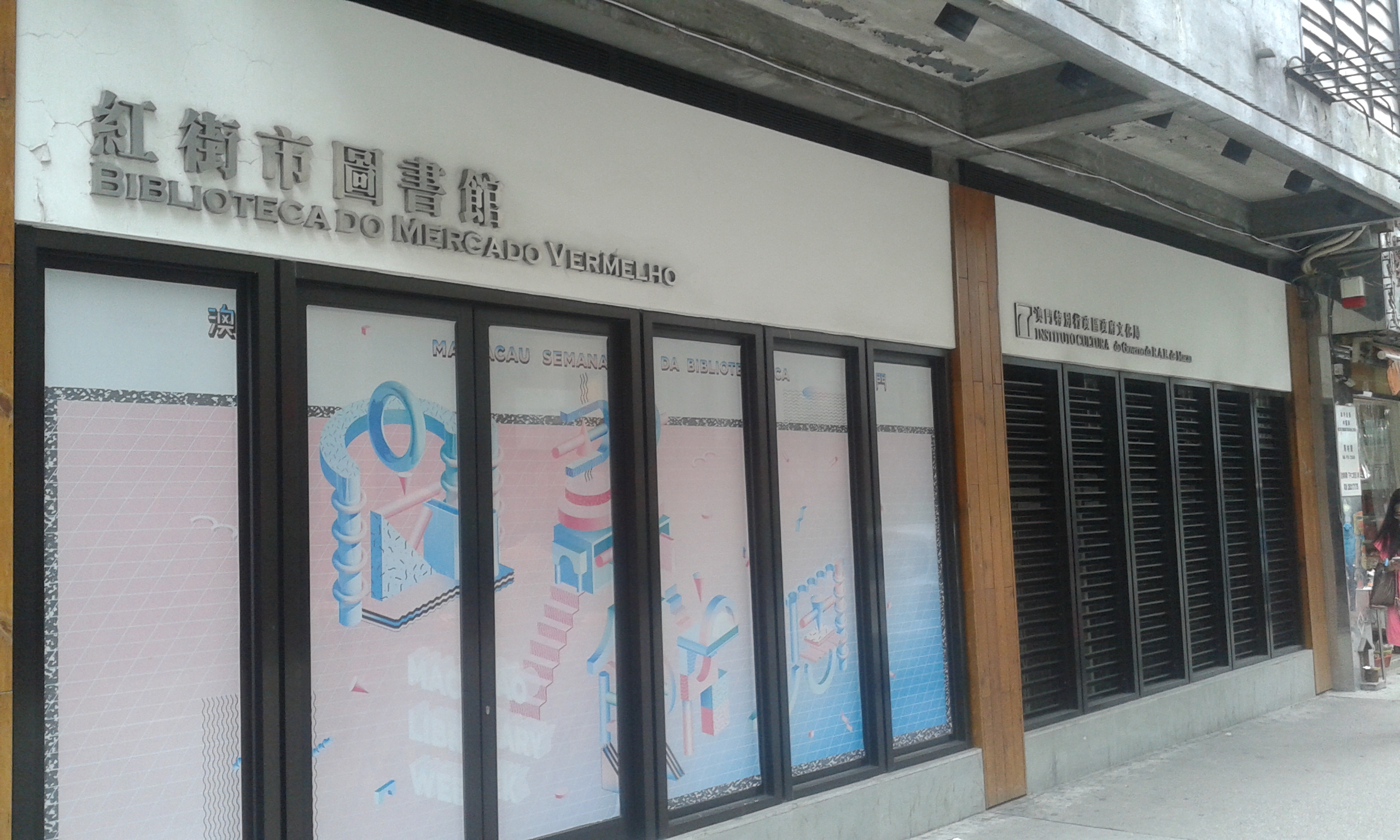
Red Market Library

Macao Public Library operates three two branches in the parish:

- Patane Library (Biblioteca do Patane; 沙梨頭圖書館)
  - It occupies seven buildings first built in the 1930s and renovated by the Macau Cultural Affairs Bureau. The library itself opened on 9 December 2016.
- Red Market Library (Biblioteca do Mercado Vermelho; 紅街市圖書館)
  - It occupies 260 m^{2} (2,800 sq ft) of a former post office, and first opened on 24 July 2012.
- Wong Ieng Kuan Library in Luis de Camões Garden (Biblioteca de Wong Ieng Kuan no Jardim Luis de Camões; 白鴿巢公園黃營均圖書館)
  - It is in a 675 m^{2} (7,270 sq ft), two story facility that first opened in 1999. It is one of several libraries built with funding by Wong Ieng Kuan (黃營均), a Chinese Peruvian.

== Tourist attractions ==
- Camões Grotto
- Casa Garden
- Fire Services Museum
- Mount Fortress
- Macau Protestant Chapel
- Museum of Macau
- Museum of Sacred Art and Crypt
- Na Tcha Temple
- Old Protestant Cemetery
- Ruins of St. Paul's

== See also ==
- List of the most densely populated administrative units in the world
