= Richmond Farm Correctional Centre =

Prison in Jamaica

- Interactive map of Richmond Farm Correctional Centre
- Location: Richmond, St Mary, Jamaica; 18.2330606°N 76.8866372°W
- Status: Operational
- Security class: Medium security
- Capacity: 235
- Managed by: Operated by the Department of Correctional Services for the Ministry of National Security

Richmond Farm Prison is a prison in Jamaica that houses up to 235 first offenders serving long-term sentences. It once incorporated a large banana farm, which was later destroyed. As of 2006, an attempt was under way to regenerate the farm with crops including bananas, corn, calaloo, string beans and cucumber.

Its most famous former ex inmate was Bunny Wailer who spent 14 months there in 1967/8. Other sources indicate Toots Hibbert served a year of an 18-month sentence there in 1966–7.

It is operated by the Department of Correctional Services for the Ministry of National Security.

== See also ==
- List of prisons in Jamaica
