= Tony Hart (businessman) =

Jamaican businessman, philanthropist, and politician (1932–2020)

The Honourable Anthony Keith Edmund Hart OJ CD
- Born: October 8, 1932; Kingston, Jamaica
- Died: August 20, 2020 (aged 87)
- Education: Queen's University, Canada
- Occupation: Businessman
- Spouse: Sheila Desnoes (m. 1960)
- Children: 4

Anthony Keith Edmund Hart OJ CD (October 8, 1932 – August 20, 2020) was a Jamaican businessman, philanthropist, and politician.

== Early life and education ==
Hart was born on October 8, 1932, in Kingston, Jamaica, but grew up in Montego Bay. He attended Munro College between 1941 and 1948, and worked briefly at the Casablanca Beach Hotel in Montego Bay, before enrolling at Queen's University in Kingston, Ontario, Canada.

== Business career ==
In 1950, Hart returned to Montego Bay after a fire destroyed his father's business establishment, Samuel Hart and Son. In 1951, He started Jamaica's first record manufacturing company, Records Ltd, in Kingston. The same year, he left Samuel Hart and Son and established Jamaica Electronics in Kingston, but returned to Montego Bay in early 1953. Soon after, he acquired the rights to a subagency for the dealership of Ford, the American automobile manufacturer. Hart called it the Northern Industrial Garage (NIG). NIG sold 300 cars in three months, at a time when cars were relatively few on Jamaican roads. He later also expanded the business to include a franchise for Avis Car Rental.

Hart is credited with starting the Montego Freeport deepwater pier, industrial hub, and Free Zone in 1967, and served as its founding Chairman and Managing Director from 1967 to 1980. He was chairman of Jamaica's national airline Air Jamaica from 1980 to 1988, and is attributed with bringing the only flights by the supersonic Concorde aircraft to Montego Bay airport in 1987. Hart is credited with establishing more than 50 companies.

== Political career ==
In 1962, Hart served as campaign manager for the successful campaign of Herbert Eldemire in the Saint James North Western constituency. He also served as a Parish Councillor for the St. James Parish Council during the sixties. In the 1972 general election, he unsuccessfully ran for office, representing the Jamaica Labour Party from the Saint James Central constituency. Hart received 4,101 votes, to 6,356 votes for the eventual winner, Francis Tulloch of the People's National Party.

== Philanthropy ==
Hart served as chairman and student mentor for the Montego Bay Branch of the Branson School of Entrepreneurship. With his assistance, the St. Mary's Preparatory School in Montpelier, St. James, increased enrollment from 70 to 430 students.

== Honors and awards ==
- Order of Distinction, Commander Class, Jamaica
- LL.D. (Hon.), University of Technology, Jamaica (2009)
- LL.D. (Hon.), University of the West Indies (2012)
- Hall of Fame, Private Sector Organization of Jamaica (2013)
- DCom (Hon.), Northern Caribbean University (2014)
- Order of Jamaica, Jamaica (2017)

== Personal life and death ==
Hart married Sheila Hart (née Desnoes) on August 26, 1960. The couple have four children: A. Mark Hart, Blaise Hart, Bruce Hart, and Wendy Schrager (née Hart). Hart died on August 20, 2020, at the age of 87.
