= Chinese Jamaicans =

Jamaicans of Chinese ancestry

Total population
- 50,228 (2011 census)

Regions with significant populations
- Saint Andrew, Saint James, Westmoreland, Manchester, Kingston Parish, Trelawny, Saint Mary, Saint Thomas, Saint Catherine

Languages
- Jamaican English, Jamaican Patois, Hakka; recent immigrants and businesspeople also speak Mandarin

Religion
- Christianity (primarily Catholicism and Anglicanism) with some elements of Chinese folk religion, Buddhism

Related ethnic groups
- Hakka people, Ethnic Chinese in Panama, Jamaican Americans, Jamaican Canadians

Chinese Jamaicans are Jamaicans of Chinese ancestry, who include descendants of migrants from China to Jamaica. Early migrants came in the 19th century; there was another wave of migration in the 1980s and 1990s. Many descendants of early migrants have moved abroad, primarily to Canada and the United States. Most Chinese Jamaicans are Hakka and many can trace their origin to the indentured Chinese laborers who came to Jamaica from the mid-19th to early 20th centuries. According to one study, approximately 4% of Jamaican men have a direct Chinese paternal ancestor.

== Migration history ==
Despite an old census record stating a "Chinese Painter" named Isaak Lawson lived in Montego Bay, St. James, in the year 1774, most Chinese Jamaicans are Hakka and can trace their origin to the indentured labourers who came to Jamaica in the mid-19th to early 20th centuries. The British parliament studied the prospects of Chinese migration to the West Indies in 1811, and in 1843 made an attempt to recruit Chinese workers to come to Jamaica, British Guiana and Trinidad and Tobago, but nothing came of it. The two earliest ships of Chinese migrant workers to Jamaica arrived in 1854—the first directly from China, the second of onward migrants from Panama who were contracted for plantation work. A further 200 arrived in the years until 1870, mostly from other Caribbean islands. In 1884, a third group of 680 Chinese migrants arrived. Records from the Jamaica Archives show that some Chinese immigrants arriving in 1884 traveled from Hong Kong under labor contracts and were assigned to work on estates in Jamaica. With the exception of a few from Sze Yup, most of these migrants were Hakka people from Dongguan, Huiyang and Bao'an. This third wave of migrants later supported more of their relatives to come from China.

Early Chinese migrants, primarily male, often entered into common-law unions with the Afro-Jamaican women who worked in their businesses. However, Chinese women rarely married Afro-Jamaican men. Interracial marriage became less common as the number of women of Chinese descent in Jamaica grew. Nevertheless, in the 1943 census, the government classified the nearly 45% of Jamaicans with some Chinese ancestry as "Chinese coloured" (mixed Chinese and African descent).

When black and Indian women had children with Chinese men, the children were called 'chaina raial' in Jamaican English. The Chinese community in Jamaica was able to consolidate as men were open to marrying Indian women as there were fewer Chinese women in the community. According to Jamaican social historian Verene A. Shepherd, the sharing of women was less common among Indians in Jamaica. Indian men fought over the small number of Indian women, which contributed to an increase in the number of Indian men murdering their wives. From 1845 to 1847, Indian women made up 11 percent of the annual Indian indentured migrants in Jamaica.

The influx of Chinese indentured immigrants aimed to replace the outlawed system of black slavery. It entailed signing a five-year contract that bound the laborers physically to specific planters and their estates and subjected them to physical and financial penalties whenever any contractual conditions were broken. The contracts consisted of a $4 wage for a 12-hour work day, also including food, clothing, medical care, and housing, although these contracts were regularly violated. Chinese immigrants could also arrive independent of the indentured system. These independent immigrants could come by paying their own way as an individual free migrant, or they could come sponsored and have their passage paid for reimbursement later. In 1917, the entire indentured immigration system was outlawed, largely due to pressure from Gandhi, who was then leading the nationalist movement in India.

From 1910, Chinese immigrants were required to pay a £30 deposit and pass a written test to demonstrate that they could write 50 words in three different languages. The restrictions on Chinese migrants were tightened even further in 1931, but relaxed again by 1947 due to lobbying by the Chinese consulate. The 1943 census showed 12,394 Chinese residing in Jamaica. These were divided into three categories by the census, namely "China-born" (2,818), "local-born" (4,061) and "Chinese coloured" (5,515), the latter referring to multiracial people of mixed African and Chinese descent. This made Chinese Jamaicans the second largest Chinese population in the Caribbean, behind Chinese Cubans. By 1963, the Chinese had a virtual monopoly on retail trade in Jamaica, controlling 90% of dry goods stores and 95% of supermarkets, along with extensive holdings in other sectors such as laundries and betting parlours.

In the 1970s, thousands of Chinese Jamaicans fled a wave of inter-ethnic violence against them; at first, they went primarily to Canada, which was more open to immigration than the United States, with the U.S. becoming a major immigration destination later on. As a result, clusters of Chinese Jamaicans can be found outside Jamaica primarily in locales like Toronto, New York City and South Florida. However, in the 1980s and 1990s, there was a new wave of Chinese migration to Jamaica, consisting of Hong Kong and Taiwanese entrepreneurs who set up textile factories on the island targeting the U.S. market and often brought in migrant workers from China to staff their ventures.

== Community organizations ==
In comparison to Overseas Chinese communities elsewhere, hometown associations related to migrants' places of origin in China were not very influential among migrants to Jamaica. Some secret societies such as the Hongmenhui were active in organizing plantation workers in the 1880s; however, the first formal Chinese organization in Jamaica was a branch of the Freemasons. Later, the Chinese Benevolent Association (中華會館) was founded in 1891. The CBA established a Chinese Sanatorium, a Chinese Public School, a Chinese Cemetery and a Chinese Almshouse. It also published its own newspaper. The CBA helped maintain a strong connection between Chinese Jamaicans and China, while simultaneously preparing Chinese Jamaican students for the Jamaican school system. The CBA continues to operate from a two-story building with guardian lion statues in the front; the ground floor is occupied by the Jamaican-Chinese Historical Museum. The building has been featured on a Jamaican postage stamp.

The first Chinese-language newspaper in Jamaica, the Zhonghua Shang Bao (中華商報), was founded in 1930 by Zheng Yongkang; five years later, it was taken over by the Chinese Benevolent Association, who renamed it Huaqiao Gongbao (華僑公報). It continued publication until 1956, and was revived in 1975. The Chinese Freemasons also published their own handwritten weekly newspaper, the Minzhi Zhoukan (民治周刊) until 1956. The Pagoda, started in 1940, was the first English-language newspaper for the Chinese community. The local branch of the Kuomintang (Chinese Nationalist Party) also began publishing their own paper, The Chung San News (中山報) in 1953.

Prior to Jamaican independence, there was an annual Miss Chinese Jamaica pageant, initially organized as a fundraiser for the CBA. It came to be supported by The Pagoda, which wrote editorials exhorting girls from the Chinese community to join, and in some years offered sponsorship prizes such as, in 1955, a two-week trip to Miami for the winner, in an effort to spark participation in what was sometimes a sparsely attended event. However, as the pageant grew in popularity, it drew charges from Afro-Jamaican journalists that the ethnic pride on display there was "unpatriotic" and "un-Jamaican". The pageant renamed itself to the Miss Chinese Athletic Club, in an effort to avoid controversy, but nevertheless, held its final "openly racialised beauty contest" in 1962. Over the following years, Chinese Jamaican women did not participate in the Miss Jamaica pageant for fear of racial controversy. However, this informal colour line was broken in 1973, when Patsy Yuen entered and earned the Miss Jamaica title in 1973, going on to place third in the Miss World competition in London; however, Yuen publicly portrayed herself as a completely assimilated Jamaican with little connection to her Chinese heritage, claiming in media statements that she didn't even like Chinese food, in order to avoid "disrupt[ing] the official picture of the country's identity".

There was also a Chinese Jamaican community school, the Chinese Public School. It was set up first by the Chinese Freemasons in 1920 (under the Chinese name 華僑公立學校), and operated until 1922; a Chinese drama club revived the school in 1924 (and gave it a new Chinese name 新民學校, literally "New People's School"), charging tuition fees of £6. The drama club continued to operate the school until 1928, when the CBA purchased it for £2,300 and gave it its present name, and moved it into a larger building. The CBA promulgated a new constitution for the school in 1944, which stated that it would follow the curriculum of the Republic of China's Ministry of Education and that Chinese was the primary medium of instruction while "foreign languages" were secondary. In 1945, with enrollments booming to 300 students and competitor schools being established as well, the Republic of China consulate called for donations to renovate the school, eventually raising £10,000. In the 1950s, there was heated debate in the community over the medium of instruction, with some suggesting curriculum localisation in the name of practicality, while others saw abandonment of Chinese-medium instruction as tantamount to abandonment of Chinese identity. Practical considerations won out; the curriculum was reorganised with English as the primary instructional medium in 1952 and by 1955, the school only had two teachers who could speak any Chinese. After that, the school's fortunes fluctuated and it was finally closed down in the mid-1960s.

The Chinese-Jamaican community remains prominent. In 1970, there were still 11,710 Chinese living in Jamaica. The community remains strong and they continue to celebrate traditional Chinese holidays, such as the Harvest Moon and Chinese New Year.

== Interethnic relations ==
The Chinese establishment of grocery shops throughout Jamaica had provoked concern amongst whites and blacks in Jamaica as early as 1911. It was widely believed that the Chinese were guilty of arson against their own property for insurance purposes, whereas previously they were only accused of sharp business practices.

Along with other immigrant ethnic groups to Jamaica that had made significant entrepreneurial achievements such as Lebanese, Syrians and Cubans, Chinese entrepreneurs were ready targets for the frustrations of some of the local Jamaican poor.

According to a newspaper report (31 March 1934) on "pernicious drugs" in Jamaica, the issue concerning opium became one of the early roots of xenophobic attitudes against the new Chinese immigrants of the early 1900s. The white elites became intolerable of this new wave of Chinese migrants coming in large numbers as shopkeepers. The newspaper editorial (10 June 1913) made the distinction between the earlier Chinese migrants and their present "poverty stricken, ignorant fellow countrymen", who were blamed for the 'opium scare' in Jamaica now that the "natives are succumbing to the vile and deadly habit". This first anti-Chinese thrust was rooted in the opium drug trade. The foundation was set for the first and a massive anti-Chinese riot in 1918.

In his book, Howard Johnson (1982) argued that, when compared to other anti-Chinese events, the 1918 event was a massive expression of anti-Chinese sentiments in Jamaica. It began in Ewarton and spread quickly to other parts of St Catherine, and other parishes such as St Mary, St Ann and Clarendon. The events were incited by a story that a Chinese shopkeeper in Ewarton caught a Jamaican off-duty policeman in a romantic liaison with his Jamaican "paramour". The shopkeeper and several of his Chinese friends brutally thrashed the Jamaican man. It was then rumoured that the policeman was killed which led to violence breaking out against the Chinese shopkeepers.

During the late 1920s letters (22 September 1926) the colonial secretary L P Waison held meetings with the police. According to the letter, Waison accused the government for its failure to employ the law against Chinese immigrants: "such as the open exploitation of shop assistants; the breaking of the spirit and gambling laws" (peaka-pow). Waison's threats were drastic. He advocated extreme violence against Chinese, "that their shops will be burnt down".

Newspaper reports in January and March 1934 described this "pernicious" drug traffic by the Chinese and expressed concern that it was spreading among the lower class of that community who were becoming "chronic opium addicts".

=== Racial discrimination and anti-Chinese riots, identity ===
Chinese Jamaicans and their descendants have described experiences of racialized stigma and complex negotiations of belonging. In her memoir Finding Samuel Lowe: China, Jamaica, Harlem, Paula Williams Madison recounts how her family was labeled “Chiney” in Jamaica and reflects on identity pressures faced by mixed-race children of Chinese shopkeepers.

The documentary Finding Samuel Lowe: From Harlem to China (directed by Jeanette Kong) records first-hand interviews with Chinese Jamaicans, Afro-Chinese family members, and relatives in China. Interviewees discuss migration-related family separation and describe how race and belonging are negotiated across Jamaica, the United States, and China.

Historical context also appears in Walton Look Lai’s The Chinese in the West Indies, 1806–1995: A Documentary History, which compiles original documents related to Chinese migration and public attitudes in the Caribbean, including Jamaica. These documents provide evidence of restrictive sentiments and episodes of anti-Chinese tension linked to economic resentment.

== Religion ==
Early Chinese migrants to Jamaica brought elements of Chinese folk religion with them, most exemplified by the altar to Lord Guan which they erected in the old CBA building and which remains standing there, even as the CBA moved its headquarters. However, with the passage of long decades since their ancestors first migrated from China, traditional Chinese religious practices have largely died out among Chinese Jamaicans. Some traditional practices persisted well into the 20th century, most evident at the Chinese Cemetery, where families would go to clean their ancestors' graves during the Qingming Festival in what was often organised as a communal activity by the CBA (referred to in English as Gah San, after the Hakka word 掛山); however, with the emigration of much of the Chinese Jamaican community to the North American mainland, the public, communal aspect of this grave-cleaning died out and indeed it was not carried out for more than a decade before attempts by the CBA to revive it in 2004.

Christianity has become the dominant religion among Chinese Jamaicans; they primarily adhere to the Catholic Church rather than the Protestantism of the majority establishment. Anglicans can also be found in the Chinese Jamaican community, but other denominations which are widespread in Jamaica such as Baptist (traditionally connected with the Afro-Jamaican community) are almost entirely absent among Chinese Jamaicans. Conversion of Chinese Jamaicans to Christianity came about in several ways; some made conversions of convenience in order to obtain easy legal recognition for marriages and births, while Chinese men who entered into relationships with local women were often absorbed into church community through the selection of godparents for their children and the attendance of children at Sunday schools. Furthermore, Catholic teachers taught English at the Chinese Public School up until its closure in the mid-1960s, which facilitated the entry of Chinese Jamaicans to well-known Catholic secondary schools. There were a large number of conversions in the mid-1950s, evidence that the Chinese were "increasingly trying to adapt themselves to local society"; a former headmaster of the Chinese Public School, He Rujun, played a major role in attracting Chinese converts to Christianity in those years.

The newest wave of Chinese migrants from Hong Kong and mainland China are mainly non-Christians, but they have not brought with them any widely visible Chinese religious practises. A few of them were already Protestants and have formed their own churches, which conduct worship services in Chinese; due to language barriers, they have little connection to the more assimilated segments of the Chinese Jamaican community.

== Cultural syncretism ==
Chinese Jamaicans have also affected the development of reggae. The trend of Chinese Jamaican involvement in reggae began in the 1960s with Vincent "Randy" Chin, his wife Patricia Chin, and their label VP Records, where artists such as Beenie Man and Sean Paul launched their careers; it remains common to see Chinese surnames in the liner notes of reggae music, attesting to the continuing influence.

Assimilation has taken place through generations and few Chinese Jamaicans can speak Chinese today; most of them speak English or Jamaican Patois as their first language. The vast majority have anglicized given names and many have Chinese surnames. The Chinese food culture has survived to a large degree among this group of people.

Common surnames among the Chinese population in Jamaica include Chai, Chan, Chang, Chen, Chin, Chong, Chung, Chow, Fong, Fung, Hugh, Kong, Leung, Li, Lim, Ling, Lowe, Lyn, Ng, Wan, Wang, Wong, Yap, Yapp, Young, Yuen, Yang, Zhang, Zheng and Zhu.

== Notable people ==
- Kyle Anderson, NBA player
- Tyson Beckford, model
- Naomi Campbell, model, actress and businesswoman
- Horace Chang, deputy prime minister of Jamaica
- Phil Chen, bass guitarist
- Ashley Chin, actor
- Clive Chin, record producer
- Tessanne Chin, singer
- Vincent Chin, record producer and VP Records label founder and owner
- Herman Chin Loy, record producer
- Cornel Chin-Sue, football player
- Delroy Chuck, cabinet minister
- Geoffrey Chung, musician
- Mark Chung, footballer
- Mikey Chung, guitarist and percussionist for notable Jamaican music groups
- Patrick Chung, American football player
- Sarah Cooper, comedian
- Ayesha Curry, actress and author
- Dennis Dun, actor
- Supa Dups, record producer
- Josh Ho-Sang, ice hockey player
- Vincent HoSang, businessman
- Leslie Kong, music producer
- Byron Lee, musician, record producer, and entrepreneur
- Robinne Lee, actress and author
- Michael Lee-Chin, billionaire businessman, philanthropist; chairman and CEO of Portland Holdings Inc
- Rose Leon, cabinet minister
- Robert Lue, biologist and professor
- Nicole Lyn, actress
- Paula Madison, journalist, writer, and businesswoman
- Sean Paul, recording artist, producer and actor
- Rachelle Smith, football player
- Karin Taylor, model and actress
- Kreesha Turner, record artist and songwriter
- Tom Wong, creator of the Tom the Great Sebastian sound system
- Henry Vernon Wong, physicist
- Lola Young, singer

== See also ==
- Caribbean–China relations
- China–Jamaica relations
- Chinese Caribbeans

== Bibliography ==
- Barnes, Natasha B. (1997), "Face of the Nation: Race, Nationalisms, and Identities in Jamaican Beauty Pageants", in López Springfield, Consuelo (ed.), Daughters of Caliban: Caribbean women in the twentieth century, Indiana University Press, pp. 285–306, ISBN 978-0-253-33249-3
- Bouknight-Davis, Gail. "Chinese Economic Development and Ethnic Identity Formation in Jamaica". In Wilson (2004), pp. 69–93.
- Lacey, Terry (1977), Violence and politics in Jamaica, 1960-70: internal security in a developing country, Manchester University Press, ISBN 978-0-7190-0633-3
- Lai, Walton Look (1993), "The people from Kwangtung", Trinidad and Tobago Review, 15 (8/9): 49–51, archived from the original on 12 May 2013
- Lai, Walton Look (1998), The Chinese in the West Indies, 1806-1995: a documentary history, University of the West Indies, ISBN 978-976-640-021-7
- Lai, Walton Look (2005), "Images of the Chinese in West Indian History", in Anderson, Wanni Wibulswasdi; Lee, Robert G. (eds.), Displacements and diasporas: Asians in the Americas, Rutgers University Press, pp. 54–77, ISBN 978-0-8135-3611-8
- Li, Anshan. "Survival, Adaptation, and Integration: Origins and Development of the Chinese Community in Jamaica". In Wilson (2004), pp. 41–68.
- Shibata, Yoshiko (2006), "Searching for a Niche, Creolizing Religious Tradition: Negotiation and Reconstruction of Ethnicity among Chinese in Jamaica", in Kumar, P. Pratap (ed.), Religious Pluralism in the Diaspora, Brill, pp. 51–72, ISBN 978-90-04-15250-2
- Wilson, Andrew R., ed. (2004), The Chinese in the Caribbean, Markus Wiener Publishers, ISBN 978-1-55876-315-9
