= New Broughton Sunset Correctional Centre =

Prison in Jamaica

- Interactive map of New Broughton Sunset Correctional Centre
- Location: Broughton, Manchester, Jamaica; 17.8972686°N 77.5176752°W
- Status: Operational
- Security class: Open
- Capacity: 80
- Managed by: Operated by the Department of Correctional Services for the Ministry of National Security

New Broughton Sunset Correctional Centre, also known as the Old Man's Prison, was built in 1916 and rebuilt in 2005 following severe damage by Hurricane Ivan the previous year. It houses up to 80 low risk and ageing (aged over 54) male inmates in open dormitories with little or no fencing and 30 warders.

This facility provides its inmates with the opportunity to grow crops and raise livestock which they sell to members of the surrounding community. It is operated by the Department of Correctional Services for the Ministry of National Security.

== See also ==
- List of prisons in Jamaica
