= South Camp Adult Correctional Centre =

Prison in Jamaica

South Camp Prison
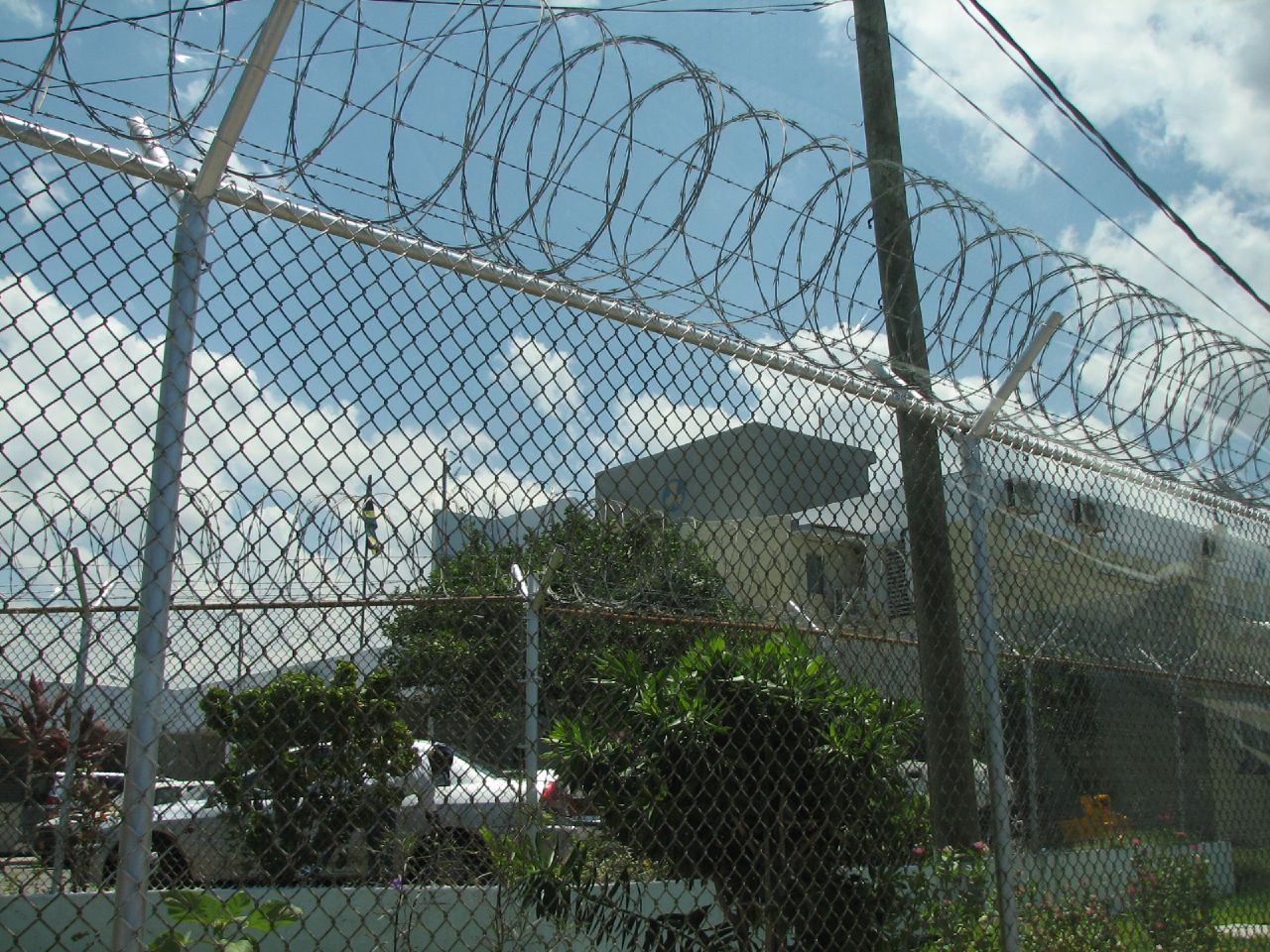
- Interactive map of South Camp Prison
- Location: Up Park Camp, Kingston, Jamaica; 17.9894°N 76.7799°W
- Status: Operational
- Security class: Maximum security
- Population: Up to 330
- Managed by: Operated by the Department of Correctional Services for the Ministry of National Security

South Camp Prison, also known as the Gun Court prison, opened in 1974 as a combined court and prison to combat the increase in violent crimes involving firearms. A single resident magistrate can issue prison sentences to those convicted of illegal possession of firearms or ammunition. It has accommodated over 330 inmates on occasions.

It is operated by the Department of Correctional Services for the Ministry of National Security.

== See also ==
- List of prisons in Jamaica
