= Tamarind Farm Correctional Centre =

Prison in Jamaica

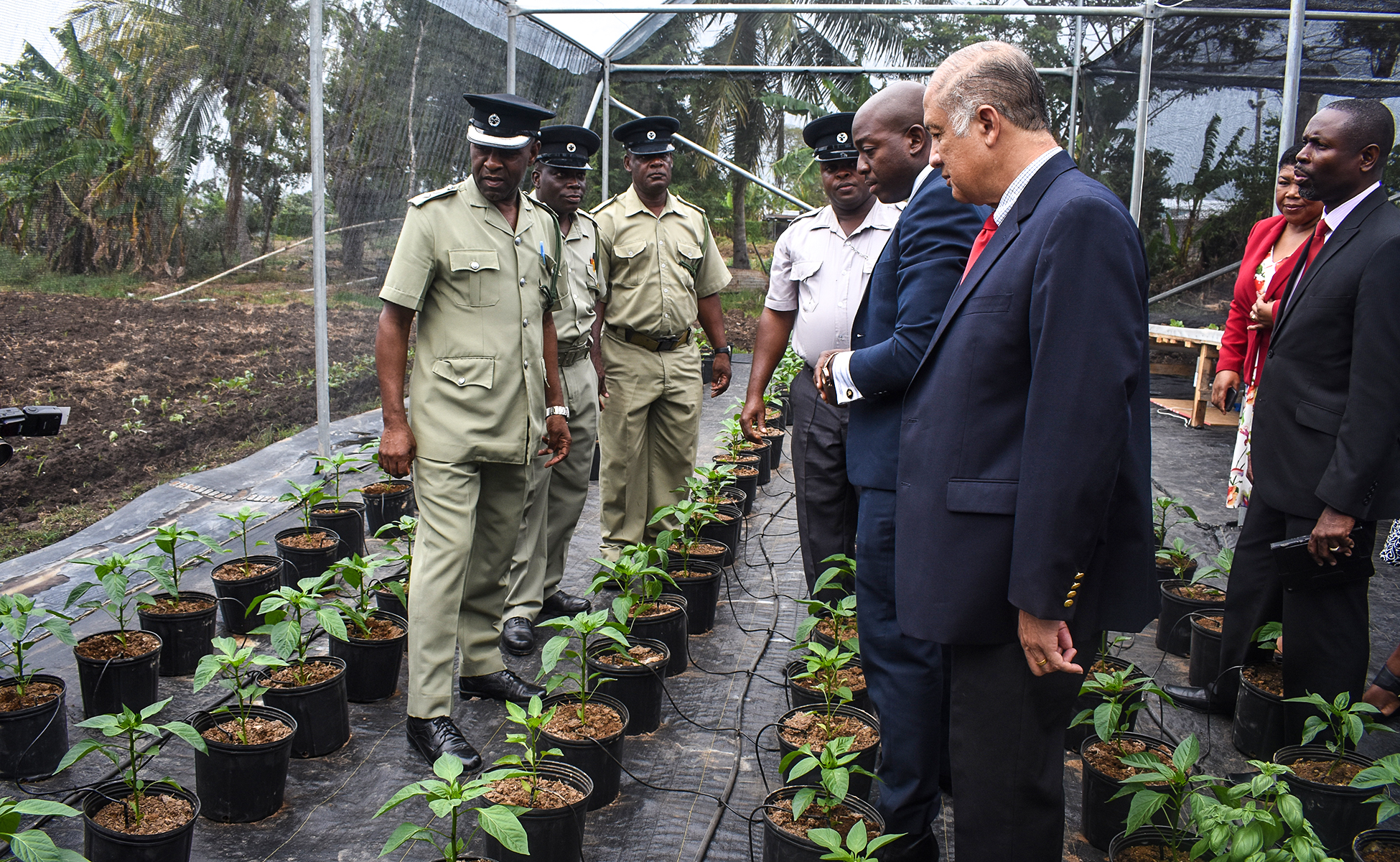
- Politicians look on as Correctional Officers show the crops that inmates of Tamarind Farm Adult Correctional Centre have planted
- Interactive map of Tamarind Farm Correctional Centre
- Location: Near Spanish Town, St Catherine, Jamaica; 17.9805904°N 76.9476467°W
- Status: Operational
- Security class: Medium security
- Population: Over 275 on occasions
- Managed by: Operated by the Department of Correctional Services for the Ministry of National Security

Tamarind Farm Correctional Centre has accommodated over 275 male inmates on occasions.

It is operated by the Department of Correctional Services for the Ministry of National Security.

== See also ==
- List of prisons in Jamaica
