= St. Catherine Adult Correctional Centre =

Correctional facility on Jamaica

Saint Catherine Prison
- Interactive map of Saint Catherine Prison
- Location: Spanish Town, St Catherine, Jamaica; 17.9930°N 76.9508°W
- Status: Operational
- Security class: Maximum security
- Capacity: approximately 700
- Population: Up to 1300
- Managed by: Operated by the Department of Correctional Services for the Ministry of National Security

St. Catherine Adult Correctional Centre, Jamaica, formerly Saint Catherine District Prison and sometimes called Spanish Town Prison, was built to accommodate 850 male inmates but has held over 1300 on occasions. It contains the only death-row on the island.

It is operated by the Department of Correctional Services for the Ministry of National Security

== See also ==
- List of prisons in Jamaica
- Capital punishment in Jamaica
