= Herbert Eldemire =

Jamaican politician (1930–2010)

The Honourable Dr. Herbert Wellesley Eldemire CD

Minister of Health
- In office 6 August 1962 – 1 March 1972
- Monarch: Elizabeth II
- Governors General: Sir Kenneth Blackburne; Sir Clifford Campbell
- Prime Minister: Alexander Bustamante; Donald Sangster; Hugh Shearer
- Succeeded by: Kenneth McNeill

Member of Parliament for Saint James North Western
- In office 1962–1967
- Preceded by: Allan G. S. Coombs
- Succeeded by: Howard Cooke

Member of Parliament for Saint James Central
- In office 1967–1972
- Succeeded by: Francis Tulloch

Member of Parliament for Saint James East Central
- In office 1976–1980
- Succeeded by: Winston Spaulding

Personal details
- Born: 16 October 1930 Montego Bay
- Died: 20 May 2010 (aged 79)
- Party: Jamaica Labour Party
- Education: Royal College of Surgeons in Ireland

Herbert Wellesley Eldemire, CD (16 October 1930 – 20 May 2010), was a Jamaican politician who served as independent Jamaica's first Minister of Health from 1962 to 1972.

== Early life and education ==
Eldemire was born to father Arthur Wellesley Eldemire and mother Alice Hyacinth Eldemire (née Holmes) in Montego Bay, Jamaica on 16 October 1930. He was educated at Munro College.

== Career ==
=== Medical career ===
Eldemire was trained as a medical doctor at the Royal College of Surgeons and Physicians (Ireland). He was a medical professional and ran a practice in Montego Bay for over 40 years. Eldemire founded the Herbert Eldemire Hospital, a private healthcare institution, in Montego Bay.

=== Political career ===
Eldemire was first elected to Parliament in 1962 from the Saint James North Western constituency, representing the Jamaica Labour Party. He was Jamaica's Minister of Health from 1962 to 1972. Eldemire pioneered the development of the health system immediately after the country gained independence. One of the most significant advances during his tenure was the introduction of the National Family Planning Program. He also campaigned for the development of medical infrastructure, such as the Cornwall Regional Hospital and the Cornwall School of Nursing.

From 1967 to 1972 he was also Chairman of the Jamaica Labour Party. In 1976, Eldemire was elected a third time to the House of Representatives as the first Member of Parliament from the newly created Saint James East Central constituency. He was a member of parliament as a member of the opposition until 1980.

== Personal life and death ==
Eldemire was married and had four children. His daughter Denise Eldemire-Shearer was married to Hugh Shearer, who was Prime Minister from 1967 to 1972. He died at his home in Reading, St, James, on 20 May 2010, at the age of 79.

== See also ==
- List of ministers of health of Jamaica

Government offices
Preceded by Ivan Lloyd	Minister of Health of Jamaica; 1962–1972	Succeeded by Kenneth McNeill
