= List of prisons in Jamaica =

Twelve correctional institutions in Jamaica are operated by the Department of Correctional Services for the Ministry of National Security.

== Contemporary institutions ==
=== Adult ===
Centres for men and women:

- The South Camp Adult Correctional Centre (SCACC)
- New Broughton Sunset Adult Correctional Centre (NBSACC) - For elderly men
- Richmond Farm adult Correctional Centre (RFACC)
- St. Catherine Adult Correctional Centre (ST.CACC) - Reception centre
- Tamarind Farm Correctional Centre (TFACC)
- Tower Street Adult Correctional Centre (TSACC) - Reception centre

Centres for women:

- Fort Augusta Adult Correctional Centre (FAACC) – Reception centre

=== Juvenile ===
There are three juvenile correctional centres:

- Armadale Juvenile Correctional Centre. (Alexandria, St. Ann Parish) - This is the centre for girls - Capacity of 40
- Hill Top Juvenile Correctional Centre. (Bamboo, St. Ann Parish) - Capacity of 98
- Rio Cobre Juvenile Correctional Centre. (Tredegar Park, Spanish Town, St. Catherine Parish) - Capacity of 120

=== Remand ===
There are two remand centres:

- Horizon Adult Remand Centre (HARC)
- Saint Andrew Juvenile Remand Centre. (Stony Hill, St. Andrew Parish) - Capacity of 48

In addition, many remand prisoners are held in police station gaols.

== Historic institutions ==
- Old Jail in St Ann's Bay
- Saint Jago Women's Centre

== See also ==
- List of schools in Jamaica
