= Horizon Adult Remand Centre =

Prison in Jamaica

- Interactive map of Horizon Adult Remand Centre
- Location: 68 Spanish Town Road, Kingston, Jamaica; 17.9827334°N 76.8092823°W
- Status: Operational
- Security class: Maximum security
- Capacity: 1026
- Opened: 2002
- Managed by: Department of Correctional Services for the Ministry of National Security

Horizon Adult Remand Centre opened in 2002 with a capacity of 1026.

It is operated by the Department of Correctional Services for the Ministry of National Security. The prison was featured in Vybz Kartel's music video for the song Conjugal Visit featuring Spice. This is possibly an allusion to his sentencing April 2014.

== See also ==
- List of prisons in Jamaica
