= Tower Street =

Tower Street is the name of:

- Great Tower Street, originally named "Tower Street", in the City of London
- Tower Street, Covent Garden, in London
- Tower Street (York), in England

== See also ==
- Tower Street Adult Correctional Centre, a prison in Jamaica
- Tower Street GAA, a former sports club in Ireland
