= Rio Cobre Juvenile Correctional Centre =

Prison in Jamaica

- Interactive map of Rio Cobre Juvenile Correctional Centre
- Location: Spanish Town, St Catherine, Jamaica; 18.0125542°N 76.952126°W
- Status: Operational
- Security class: Open
- Capacity: 120
- Managed by: Operated by the Department of Correctional Services for the Ministry of National Security

Rio Cobre Juvenile Correctional Centre was built to accommodate 120 male inmates.

It is operated by the Department of Correctional Services for the Ministry of National Security.

== See also ==
- List of prisons in Jamaica
