= Rachelle Smith =

Rachelle Smith may refer to:

- Rachelle Smith (footballer), Jamaican international female footballer
- Rachelle Boone-Smith, American former sprint athlete

== See also ==
- Rachelle Smit, American politician from Michigan
