= Francis Tulloch =

Jamaican politician (1940–2022)

The Honourable Francis Anthony Tulloch

Minister of Tourism
- In office 13 April 1997 – 1999
- Monarch: Elizabeth II
- Governor General: Sir Howard Cooke
- Prime Minister: P. J. Patterson
- Preceded by: John Junor
- Succeeded by: P. J. Patterson

Member of Parliament for Saint James Central
- In office 1972–1976
- Preceded by: Herbert Eldemire

Member of Parliament for Saint James West Central
- In office 1976–1980
- Succeeded by: Carl Rhoden

Member of Parliament for Hanover Eastern
- In office 1993–1997
- Preceded by: Aston King
- Succeeded by: Canute Brown

Member of Parliament for Saint James North Western
- In office 1997–2001
- Preceded by: Carl Miller
- Succeeded by: Horace Chang

Personal details
- Born: 5 August 1940 Kingston, Colony of Jamaica, British Empire
- Died: 23 June 2022 (aged 81)
- Party: People's National Party
- Spouse: Doreen Perry Ellis (m. 1989)
- Education: Lincoln's Inn

Francis Anthony Tulloch (5 August 1940 – 23 June 2022) was a Jamaican politician, lawyer and diplomat who served as Minister of Tourism from 1997 to 1999.

== Early life and education ==
Tulloch was born to father Samuel Vincent Tulloch and mother Rhea Henriques-Tulloch in Kingston, Jamaica on 5 August 1940. He was educated at St. George's College.

== Career ==
=== Legal career ===
Tulloch was admitted to Lincoln's Inn on 23 September 1959. He was called to the bar on 5 February 1963. On his return to Jamaica, he practised as a barrister. From 1964 to 1969 he practiced law in Nassau, Bahamas serving as Legal Professional Assistant to Sir Lynden Pindling, future Prime Minister of The Bahamas. Tulloch later returned to Jamaica and resumed his law practice, this time doing less criminal law and engaging himself in political work on behalf of the People's National Party (PNP).

=== Political career ===
Tulloch was first elected to Parliament in 1972 from the Saint James Central constituency, representing the People's National Party. From 1976 to 1980, he represented the Saint James West Central constituency. After the People's National Party decided not to contest the 1983 general election, Tulloch returned to his law practice. From 1993 to 1997 he was Member of Parliament for the Hanover Eastern constituency, and from 1997 to 2002, he represented Saint James North Western.

Tulloch was Minister of State in the Ministry of Tourism from 1993 to 1995. He served as Jamaica's Minister of Tourism from 1997 to 1999 in the government of P. J. Patterson.

=== Diplomatic career ===
Tulloch was appointed Honorary Consul of the Russian Federation in Montego Bay on 27 May 2014.

== Personal life ==
Tulloch married Doreen Perry Ellis on 19 August 1989. He is the father of four sons and two daughters. Tulloch died on 23 June 2022.

Government offices
Preceded by John Junor	Minister of Tourism of Jamaica; 1997–1999	Succeeded by P. J. Patterson
