= Ivy Cooke =

The Most Honourable Ivy, Lady Cooke

Wife of the Governor-General of Jamaica
- In office 1 August 1991 – 15 February 2006
- Preceded by: Josephine Glasspole
- Succeeded by: Rheima Hall

Personal details
- Born: Ivy Sylvia Lucille Tai; 27 June 1916
- Died: 5 June 2017 (aged 100)
- Spouse: Howard Cooke (m. 1939)
- Children: Howard Jr. Richard; Audrey

Ivy Sylvia Lucille Cooke, Lady Cooke (née Tai; 27 June 1916 – 5 June 2017) was a Jamaican educator who was best known as the wife of Sir Howard Cooke, the Governor-General of Jamaica from 1991 to 2006. She was known as Lady Cooke after her husband's knighthood.

== Biography ==
Ivy Sylvia Lucille Tai was the daughter of a "successful merchant" of Chinese descent.

She attended the Warsop All-Age School in Trelawny, and then went on to the Bethlehem Teacher Training College. Cooke taught for periods at Montego Bay High School for Girls (guidance counsellor), Montego Bay Boys' School (assistant principal), and Bell Castle All-Age School (assistant principal and acting principal). She later worked for the Ministry of Education as a supervisor of teacher colleges and an early childhood education officer. Her husband, Howard Cooke, also trained as a teacher; they married in July 1939, and had three children together – Howard Jr., Richard, and Audrey. After their marriage they initially taught together in a remote community in Portland Parish.

In 1991, Cooke's husband was appointed Governor-General; he had previously been a People's National Party politician. She supervised the running of King's House during his 15-year tenure, and cultivated vegetable gardens on the grounds as well as raising goats, rabbits, cattle, and chickens. She had a particular interest in music, serving as patron of the Jamaica Independence Festival and starting the tradition of annual Christmas concerts at King's House.

Cooke was 89 years when her husband left office, and he was 90. They retired to Brandon Hill, in Montego Bay Jamaica, and celebrated their 70th wedding anniversary in 2009. Sir Howard Cooke died in July 2014, aged 98, mere days before the couple's 75th wedding anniversary. Lady Ivy Cooke died in June 2017, 22 days before what would have been her 101st birthday. She was given a state funeral, and interred at the National Heroes Park in Kingston.

Her death was noted in the Parliament of Jamaica, with both Prime Minister Andrew Holness and Leader of the Opposition Peter Phillips making condolence statements.
