= Headley Cunningham =

Jamaican politician

The Honourable Headley Washington Cunningham OJ CD QC MP

8th Speaker of the Jamaica House of Representatives

Member of the Jamaica House of Representatives
- In office 1989–1993

Member of the Jamaica House of Representatives
- In office 1989–1993

Personal details
- Born: October 12, 1929 Darliston, Westermoreland, Jamaica
- Died: September 22, 2023 (aged 93)
- Party: People's National Party
- Profession: Lawyer

Headley Washington Cunningham, OJ (12 October 1929 – 22 September 2018) was a Jamaican politician. A member of the People's National Party, he was Speaker of the House of Representatives from 1989 to 1993.

== Early life ==
Cunningham was born on 12 October 1929 in Darliston, Westermoreland, Jamaica, the youngest of three children to Frank and Estella (née Maxwell). He was educated at Cornwall College in Montego Bay, St James, after which he found employment as an accountant at the Kingston-based Public Works Department. Cunningham subsequently left for England to study law.

== Career ==
Returning from England, Cunningham became president of the Cornwall Bar Association. He entered electoral politics in 1989, when he was elected as a member of parliament. From 1989 to 1993, he was Speaker of the House of Representatives. From 1992 to 1993, he sat on the executive committee of the Commonwealth Parliamentary Association, of which he was vice-chairperson. In 1998, Cunningham became a member of the Privy Council of Jamaica.

== Death ==
Cunningham died on 22 September 2018 aged 88, after struggling with health issues. Official funerary rites were conducted by the government of Jamaica on 25 October at the Mount Carey Baptist Church in Anchovy, St James. Cunningham was buried on the same day at the church cemetery.

== Recognition ==
In 2007, Cunningham was awarded the Order of Jamaica (OJ) for "outstanding service in the field of Law".

== See also ==
- List of speakers of the House of Representatives of Jamaica
