= Tower Street Adult Correctional Centre =

Prison in Jamaica

Tower Street Prison (formerly The General Penitentiary)
- Interactive map of Tower Street Prison (formerly The General Penitentiary)
- Location: Tower Street, Kingston, Jamaica; 17.9668337°N 76.7808509°W
- Status: Operational
- Security class: Maximum security
- Capacity: 650
- Population: 2000
- Managed by: Department of Correctional Services for the Ministry of National Security
- Director: Kevin Wallen

Tower Street Adult Correctional Centre is a prison in Jamaica.

== History ==
In 1840, a statute was passed to establish a General Penitentiary in Jamaica. The preamble to the law stated that it was necessary "not only for the safe custody of convicted criminals, but to ensure the more important object of their restoration to society, in a state of reformation and improvement, by a uniform course of well regulated labour, and judicious instruction." This followed a report in 1838 by J. W. Pringle into prison conditions in the British West Indies, wherein he had concluded "a proper penitentiary in Jamaica is indispensable towards carrying out any plan of prison reform." The foundation stone was laid by the Earl of Elgin, the governor, in 1845, and was "so general a holiday we have rarely seen." In 1847, the walls enclosing the penitentiary were completed, and work on the cells and hospital began.

It was formerly the General Penitentiary, and was built to accommodate 650 male inmates but has held over 1700 on occasions. Construction of the current building began in 1845, shortly after the end of slavery. Previously, the Kingston House of Correction stood on the same site. The new penitentiary was designed according to the 'separate system' in which prisoners are held in isolation, although in practice sharing of the small cells has been common.

It is operated by the Department of Correctional Services for the Ministry of National Security.

== See also ==
- List of prisons in Jamaica
