= Cornwall College, Jamaica =

Public college in Saint James Parish, Jamaica

Cornwall College
- Shield of Cornwall College, Jamaica

Location
- 1 Orange Street; Montego Bay, Cornwall; Jamaica
- 18.4790°N 77.9213°W

Information
- Other names: C.C.; CC; College; Cornwall
- Former name: Montego Bay Government Secondary School
- Motto: Disce aut Discede (Learn or Leave)
- Denomination: Non-denominational
- Founded: 1896; 130 years ago
- School code: 08035
- Chair: Patrick Reid
- Principal: Michael Ellis
- Years offered: 7–13
- Gender: Boys
- Age range: 10–19
- Enrolment: 1,317 (2018)
- Student to teacher ratio: 19:1
- Language: English, Jamaican Patois
- Hours in school day: 6
- Campus type: Urban
- Colours: Red and gold
- Rival: Munro College
- Yearbook: The Cornwallian
- Website: cornwallcollege.edu.jm

Cornwall College is a public high school for boys established in 1896 and located on Orange Street in Montego Bay, Saint James, Jamaica. It is the third oldest high school in the county of Cornwall. As of the 2022-23 school year, the school had an enrollment of just over 1,500 students and 80 classroom teachers, for a student–teacher ratio of 19:1.

== History ==
=== 1841–1895 ===
The school in St. James dates to the 19th century, when secondary education was greatly needed in the parish and George Millar, a teacher from Scotland, opened the Montego Bay Academy in 1841. In 1952, the academy was moved to the Presbyterian House, which was at the time located at 56 Union Street. In 1871 the academy closed its doors when representatives from Scotland encouraged the government of Jamaica to establish a Queen's College in Spanish Town. This institution also did not last long and again government-sponsored secondary education was lacking in the country. In 1895, a Presbyterian minister, Rev. Adam Thomson, and a government representative for St. James and Trelawny, Hon. John Kerr, petitioned the government to allocate 500 pounds for secondary education in Montego Bay.

=== 1896–1921 ===
Thus, in 1896, Cornwall College was born. The school was at that time located on Barracks Road (site of the Public Works Office) and was called Montego Bay Government Secondary School.

Mr. E. Lockett, B.A., was named the first headmaster and he served until 1903. He was succeeded by Anglican priest, Rev. George Hibbert Leader, in 1904. Leader served some 19 years at the helm of the institution, which ran into difficulties due to the rapid growth of the student body and the resulting lack of classroom space. It was then that in 1909 the Hon. D. A. Corinaldi stepped in and used his considerable influence and status to procure 2,500 pounds from the government to assist in the establishment of a new school site.

Between 1910 and 1911, 34 acres of land were bought at the Pleasant Hill Estate where the institution was constructed. The school was officially opened at its new location in 1911 by the then governor of Jamaica, Sir Sidney Olivier.

=== 1922 – present ===
In 1922, Montego Bay Government Secondary School was renamed Cornwall College after Cornwall County, Jamaica in which it is located. In 1953, Cornwall College came under the leadership of Mr. E.A. Barrett, the school's first Jamaican-born headmaster. Under Barrett's leadership, the school's population grew to over 650 boys. During his tenure, the institution was named the first government school in Jamaica and also the first high school in the West Indies to offer chemistry and physics as subjects in its curriculum, and for many years the majority of doctors and pharmacists in Jamaica were graduates of the school.

Cornwall College now houses some 52 classrooms and 1,245 students. Former principal, Dr. Lennox Rowe, took office from acting principal Vinette Virgo in 2016. He left the institution in 2017, upper school vice principal, Mrs. Lecia Allen took the role of acting principal. On 8 May 2018, Mr. Michael Ellis, former principal of Green Pond High School for 13 years, took office from acting principal Lecia Allen. The buildings are very colourful, sporting the school colours of red and gold.

Many well-known figures have passed through the gates of Cornwall College including Speaker of the House of Representatives: Hon. Headley Cunningham; Chief Justices Sir Rowland Phillips, Sir Herbert Duffus and Kenneth Smith; Members of Parliament: Dr. Horace Chang, Dr. Kenneth Baugh, Dr. Karl Blythe, Arthur Nelson, Lloyd B. Smith (Editor of the Western Mirror) and the late Patrick Rosegreen; Ambassador Derrick Heaven; the late Dr. Garth Taylor; the late Walt Crooks, owner of Club Inferno Resort; William "Billy" Craig, former Custos Rotulorum of St. James; Montego Bay businessman Carlton Chin; American businessman Vincent HoSang; Physics professors Dr. H. Vernon Wong and Dr. Paul M. Shand; Chemistry professor Dr. Vernon G. S. Box.

=== Enrollment of girls ===
Cornwall College no longer enrolls female students in their Sixth Form programme as of 2015–2016. The programme began at the start of the academic year 2013–2014, 117 years after the school's establishment as an all-male institution. It ended as mentioned earlier in the academic year of 2015–2016. The programme has reverted to its original state of being unisex.

== List of headmasters and principals ==
- Mr. E. V. Lockett (1896–1903)
- Rev. George Hibbert Leader (1904–1923)
- Rev. E. B. Baker (1924–1940)
- Mr. John Hardie (1940–1942)
- Lt. Col. Norman E. Jackson ( –1953)
- Mr. Everald Arthurton Barrett (1956–1966)
- Mr. James Arthur William Crick (1966–1976)
- Mr Bevill St Elmo deBruin (actg.) (1976–1978)
- Dr. Dudley Clifford Stokes (1978–1984)
- Mrs Vilma Baugh (actg.) (1984–1986)
- Mr. Noel Monteith (1986 - 1990)
- Mr. Croswell Taylor (1990? – 2006?)
- Mr. Denham McIntyre (2006–2014?)
- Mrs. Vinette Virgo (actg.) (2014–2016)
- Dr. Lennox Rowe (2016–2017)
- Mrs. Lecia Allen (actg.) (2017–2019)
- Mr. Michael Ellis (2018– )

== Historic buildings ==
Harrison House, one of the original boarding houses at Cornwall College was declared a National Heritage site by the Jamaica National Heritage Trust in 1999.

== Motto ==
The school's motto is Disce aut Discede — Learn or Leave.

== Academics ==
School Profile
Year	Enrollment	Student-Teacher Ratio
2018	1,317	19:1
2017	1,436	21:1
2016	1,462	22:1
2015	1,420	22:1
2014	1,380	21:1
2013	1,385	21:1
2012	1,396	21:1

=== Jamaica Scholars ===
- Henry Vernon Wong (1957)
- Eddison Leighton (1983)

=== Rhodes Scholars ===
- Rex Nettleford (1957)
- Henry Vernon Wong (1961)
- Ernest Milton Hew (1964)
- David McBean (1988)

=== Extracurricular activities ===
Cornwall has been successful in extracurricular activities such as the performing arts, essay competitions, and debating competitions.

Additionally, achievements in the performing arts, one of the school's oldest and most successful, yet under-appreciated/supported societies has done excellently over the years. The young men have copped several gold and silver medals and national awards in the annual JCDC festival of the arts competition (Music & Speech) and have performed nationally at several functions island wide. Recently, the performing arts society underwent a change in the operations of its award-winning boys choir (CCBC). The school's closest neighboring all-girls school, Mount Alvernia High School, was incorporated into the school's performing arts society. They are dubbed the MACC (pronounced 'mak') Singers - (Mount Alvernia Cornwall College Singers) and serve as the combined choir for both schools. The choir has lived up to the expectations of both schools' high performance in music and have won numerous awards at music festival and the Dr. Olive Lewin Award for best choral music presentation twice (2012 and 2013).

Cornwall College has an adequate Interact Club (of Rotary International) which is a major club of its sort in western Jamaica. Their ruling government is unknown.

The art department is a well-known patron of many national poster competitions.

The Geography Club of Cornwall has participated in several events and return many trophies to the institution.

The Cornwall College Chess Club has a history of being one of the stronger chess teams in western Jamaica.

The Cornwall College cadet unit was placed first in the 4th battalion and third in the 2011 annual inspection. Cadets from Cornwall captured the top four positions on the star four examinations in February 2011. This was the first time the top four positions were taken by cadets from the same unit. Cadets from Cornwall were engaged in World War II.

== Sports ==
Upon entering Cornwall College, each student is assigned to one of six houses. The houses are named after prominent past principals.

- Baker
- Barrett
- Jackson
- Kerr
- Leader
- Lockett

The school hosts an annual inter-house sporting competition called Sports Day. Students compete in football, track and field, basketball, inter-house quiz and other events to earn points for their respective houses. The winning house will be crowned champion for that year. There are also team and individual medals.

The school has excelled in sports and was named one of the top male institution in football (soccer), holding the famous Olivier Shield over 11 times. Upon the inception of the schoolboy daCosta Cup competition, Cornwall College also displayed their talents and skills to grab a hold of the trophy in 1953, 55, 56, 58, 59, 63, 82, 83, 95, 2000, 2001 and 2016. Furthermore, they are currently the defending champions of the ISSA basketball U19 and U16 competitions for the last three years.

== Notable alumni ==
=== Arts and humanities ===
- John Ebenezer Clare McFarlane, Poet Laureate of Jamaica
- Professor Hon. Ralston Milton "Rex" Nettleford, former vice-chancellor of the University of the West Indies
- Maurice Tomlinson, Esq., attorney, law lecturer, prominent LGBTQ+ advocate, and HIV/AIDS activist
- Anthony C. Winkler, Jamaican novelist

=== Business ===
- Vincent Hosang, OD, entrepreneur and philanthropist
- Denham Jolly, Canadian businessman

=== Judiciary ===
- Sir Herbert Duffus, Chief Justice (1968–1973) and acting governor-general of Jamaica
- Sir Rowland Phillips, Chief Justice of Jamaica (1963-1968) and acting governor-general of Jamaica
- Hon. Kenneth Smith, OJ, Chief Justice of Jamaica (1973-1984).

=== Politics ===
- Hon. Dr. Kenneth Baugh, former deputy prime minister and minister of foreign affairs and trade
- Hon. Dr. Horace Chang, member of Parliament for North-West St. James and minister of water and housing
- Hon. Headley Cunningham, OJ, speaker of the House of Representatives (1989-1993)
- Hon. Heroy Clarke, member of Parliament for St. James Central Constituency
- Hon. Homer Davis, CD, JP member of Parliament for St. James Southern

=== Science, technology, engineering and medicine ===
- Dr. Andre Haughton, Jamaican economist and politician
- Dr. The Hon. Garth Taylor, OJ, ophthalmologist and philanthropist
- Professor H. Vernon Wong, Ph.D., plasma physicist.

=== Sports ===
- Warren Barrett, Jamaican international footballer
- Hon. Steve Bucknor, OJ, international cricket umpire and coach
- Jourdaine Fletcher, Jamaican international footballer
- Esmond Kentish, West Indian cricketer
- Dane Richards, Jamaican international footballer
- Donovan Ricketts, Jamaican international footballer

== Former teachers ==
- Rt. Hon. P. J. Patterson, former prime minister of Jamaica
