= Hill Top Juvenile Correctional Centre =

Prison in Jamaica

- Interactive map of Hill Top Juvenile Correctional Centre
- Location: Bamboo, St Ann, Jamaica; 18.379523°N 77.239852°W
- Status: Operational
- Security class: High
- Capacity: 98
- Managed by: Operated by the Department of Correctional Services for the Ministry of National Security

Hill Top Correctional Centre was built to accommodate ninety eight boys. It is operated by the Department of Correctional Services for the Ministry of National Security.

== See also ==
- List of prisons in Jamaica
