= Saint Jago Women's Centre =

Closed prison of women in Jamaica

- Interactive map of Saint Jago Women's Centre
- Location: Spanish Town, St Catherine, Jamaica; 18.0011°N 76.9520°W
- Status: Closed
- Capacity: Unknown
- Closed: Unknown

Saint Jago Women's Centre has been closed, making Fort Augusta the only women's prison on the island.

== See also ==
- List of prisons in Jamaica
