= Fort Augusta Adult Correctional Centre =

Prison in Jamaica

Fort Augusta Prison
- Interactive map of Fort Augusta Prison
- Location: Portmore, St Catherine, Jamaica; 17.96662°N 76.84795°W
- Status: Closed
- Security class: Maximum security
- Capacity: 250
- Population: Up to 280
- Managed by: Operated by the Department of Correctional Services for the Ministry of National Security

Fort Augusta is a fortification in the parish of St Catherine, Jamaica. Originally built in the 1740s, from 1954 to 2017 the fort was used as a prison.

== History ==
Fort Augusta was originally a fortress built by the English in the 1740s to provide the main defence for Kingston Harbour’s west side. It was completed in the 1750s and named Fort Augusta in honour of the mother of King George III. In 1763 lightning struck the fort and its three thousand barrels of gunpowder causing an explosion that broke windows 17 miles away and killed three hundred people. The shocks created a crater which had to be filled before reconstruction could begin. During the American Revolution the fort was occupied by the Duke of Cumberland's Regiment. The remains of the fortress now consists of massive crumbling walls of brick that have been fortified with other materials (including barbed wire).

The fort was located on the north side of the harbor mouth near the main channel. Built near a mangrove swamp, the garrison had a high death rate from tropical diseases. Some time around 1850 the garrison was moved to the isolated Newcastle, Jamaica, 12 miles northeast and 3500 feet higher.

In 1954, the fort was opened as a prison.

In March 2017, inmates in Fort Augusta were relocated to the South Camp Rehabilitation Centre.

In April 2020 it was announced that the Jamaican government intends to use Fort Augusta as a half way house and counselling center for returning deportees.

== See also ==
- List of prisons in Jamaica
