= Armadale Juvenile Correctional Centre =

Prison in Jamaica

- Interactive map of Armadale Juvenile Correctional Centre
- Location: Diamond Crest Villa, Manchester Parish Previous location: Alexandria, St Ann, Jamaica; 18.294639°N 77.361292°W
- Status: Operational
- Security class: Medium
- Capacity: 40
- Managed by: Operated by the Department of Correctional Services for the Ministry of National Security

Armadale Juvenile Correctional Centre was built to accommodate 40 girls. It is operated by the Department of Correctional Services for the Ministry of National Security.

On 22 May 2009 a fire went through the facility, killing 5 girls and injuring 13 girls. The 45 surviving prisoners, who were aged 13 to 16, were temporarily placed in the Stony Hill Heart Academy in St. Andrew Parish and the Horizon Remand Centre in west Kingston. Prime Minister of Jamaica Bruce Golding ordered the closure of the burned Armadale facility. Government investigations showed that the incident occurred after a Jamaican Police officer set the place on fire after having been rejected by a young teen girl he had tried to lure into sexual relations with him. The replacement facility is located in Diamond Crest Villa near Alligator Pond in Manchester Parish.

== See also ==
- List of prisons in Jamaica
