= Disce aut discede =

Disce Aut Discede (Latin literally "Learn or Depart"; idiomatically "Learn or leave", "Get on or get out" or "Up or out") is a phrase used as the motto of many institutions and schools.

== Educational institutions ==
Disce Aut Discēde is the motto at King's School, Rochester, the second-oldest school in the world, established in 604 AD. It is also the traditional motto of Penistone Grammar School (founded 1392).

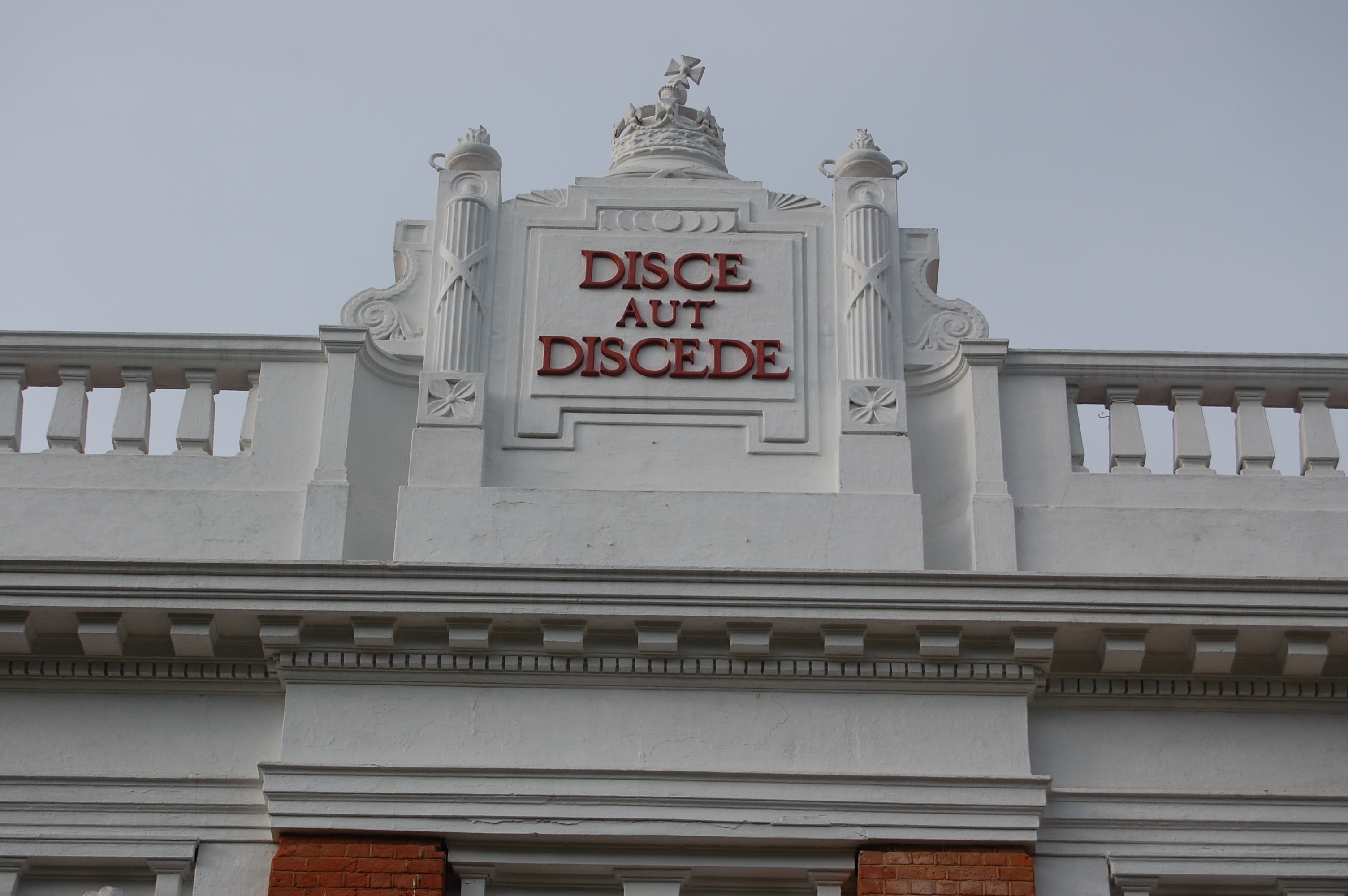
The Royal College motto on top of the main building in Colombo, Sri Lanka.

The Royal College, Colombo in Sri Lanka also uses "Disce aut Discēde" as one of its official mottoes. The author and the date that the motto was adopted by the Royal are unknown. The first mention of the motto was during the tenure of Principal Todd (1871–1878) who constantly reminded dullards that they must learn or depart.

It is also the motto of Gosfield Independent School in Essex, England, and the variation "Aut Disce, Aut Discēde" ("Either Learn or Leave") is the motto of Hutton Grammar School in Preston, Lancashire. It was the motto for Middlesbrough High School, and is also carved above the entrance to the old school and almshouse building in Bunny, Nottinghamshire, built by Sir Thomas Parkyn in 1700.

"Disce aut Discēde" is also the motto of the male only high school, Cornwall College located in Montego Bay, Jamaica.

The coat of arms of the University of Manchester Surgical Society contains the motto "disce aut discede".

An old painting at Winchester College contains an expanded version in the form of a hexameter: "Aut disce, aut discēde; manet sors tertia, caedī" ("Either learn or leave: there remains a third Chance to be Defeated/Stricken/beaten", or more vulgarly "learn, leave or be licked".) "Aut disce" is surmounted by a bishop's mitre; "aut discēde" by a sword and an inkpot, to denote secular professions; the last part of the verse by a rod.

== In fiction ==
"Aut disce aut discede" appears as the motto of the fictitious Roosevelt High School, which April O'Neil attends in the 2012 Teenage Mutant Ninja Turtles TV series.

"Aut disce aut discede" also appears as the motto of National City University, a ficticitious University in CW's Supergirl universe (Season 3: Ep. 5).
