= Saint James West Central =

Election constituency of Jamaican parliament

Saint James West Central is a parliamentary constituency represented in the House of Representatives of the Jamaican Parliament. It elects one Member of Parliament by the first past the post system of election. The constituency was first contested in the 1976 general election. The current MP is the Hon. Marlene Malahoo Forte of the Jamaica Labour Party who has been in office since 2016.

== Boundaries ==
The constituency covers the Granville, Mount Salem, and Spring Garden electoral divisions in St. James.

== Members of Parliament ==
Election	Member	Party
1976	Francis Tulloch	People's National Party
1980	Carl Rhoden	Jamaica Labour Party
1983	Carl Rhoden	Jamaica Labour Party
1989	Patrick Rose-Green	People's National Party
1993	Arthur Nelson	People's National Party
1997	Arthur Nelson	People's National Party
2002	Clive Mullings	Jamaica Labour Party
2007	Clive Mullings	Jamaica Labour Party
2011	Sharon Ffolkes-Abrahams	People's National Party
2016	Marlene Malahoo Forte	Jamaica Labour Party
2020	Marlene Malahoo Forte	Jamaica Labour Party

== Elections ==
=== Elections from 2000 to Present ===
General Election 2020: Saint James West Central
Party	Candidate	Votes	%	±%
JLP	Marlene Malahoo Forte	6,144	58.3	▲3.6
PNP	Andre Haughton	4,389	41.7	▼2.6
Turnout		10,533		
Registered electors				
JLP hold				

General Election 2016: Saint James West Central
Party	Candidate	Votes	%	±%
JLP	Marlene Malahoo Forte	6,635	54.7	▲7.9
PNP	Sharon Ffolkes-Abrahams	5,374	44.3	▼8.2
MGPPP	Clifford Barnett	40	0.3	▲0.1
Turnout		12,127	45.0	▼3.9
Registered electors		26,975		▲11.7
JLP gain from PNP				

General Election 2011: Saint James West Central
Party	Candidate	Votes	%	±%
PNP	Sharon Ffolkes-Abrahams	6,208	52.5	▲4.7
JLP	Clive Mullings	5,535	46.8	▼4.5
MGPPP	Clifford Barnett	21	0.2	
Turnout		11,824	48.9	▼7.5
Registered electors		24,159		▼9.8
PNP gain from JLP				

General Election 2007: Saint James West Central
Party	Candidate	Votes	%	±%
JLP	Clive Mullings	7,752	51.3	▼1.9
PNP	Francis Tulloch	7,216	47.8	▲3.1
NDM	Apollone Reid	51	0.3	▲1.2
Turnout		15,106	56.4	▼0.5
Registered electors		26,779		▲13.9
JLP hold				

General Election 2002: Saint James West Central
Party	Candidate	Votes	%	±%
JLP	Clive Mullings	7,121	53.2	▲8.8
PNP	Hugh Solomon	5,980	44.7	▼5.1
NDM	Juan Reid	204	1.5	▼3.7
Turnout		13,380	56.9	▲1.3
Registered electors		23,516		▲10.8
JLP gain from PNP				

=== Elections from 1980 to 1999 ===
General Election 1997: Saint James West Central
Party	Candidate	Votes	%	±%
PNP	Arthur Nelson	5,873	49.8	▼9.9
JLP	Anthony Lewin	5,246	44.4	▲4.4
NDM	Ainsley Blair	618	5.2	
Turnout		11,804	55.6	▲0.0
Registered electors		21,229		▲39.5
PNP hold				

General Election 1993: Saint James West Central
Party	Candidate	Votes	%	±%
PNP	Arthur Nelson	5,215	59.7	▲1.0
JLP	Anthony Lewin	3,439	39.4	▼0.2
Turnout		8,735	57.4	▼18.5
Registered electors		15,215		▼11.5
PNP hold				

General Election 1989: Saint James West Central
Party	Candidate	Votes	%	±%
PNP	Patrick Rose-Green	7,651	58.7	
JLP	Winston Watt	5,165	39.6	
Turnout		13,035	75.9	
Registered electors		17,184		▲12.9
PNP gain from JLP				

General Election 1983: Saint James West Central
Party	Candidate	Votes	%	±%
JLP	Carl Rhoden			
Turnout				
Registered electors		15,226		
JLP hold				

General Election 1980: Saint James West Central
Party	Candidate	Votes	%	±%
JLP	Carl Rhoden	7,884	59.7	▲24.1
PNP	Clive Dobson	5,285	40.0	
Turnout		13,199	86.7	
Registered electors		15,226		▲20.7
JLP gain from PNP				

=== Elections from 1976 to 1979 ===
General Election 1976: Saint James West Central
Party	Candidate	Votes	%	±%
PNP	Francis Tulloch	6,708	64.1	
JLP	Winston Watt	3,725	35.6	
Turnout		10,464	83.0	
Registered electors		12,612		
PNP win (new seat)				

== See also ==
- Politics of Jamaica
- Elections in Jamaica
