= Marlene Malahoo Forte =

Jamaican politician

The Honourable Marlene Malahoo Forte KC MP JP
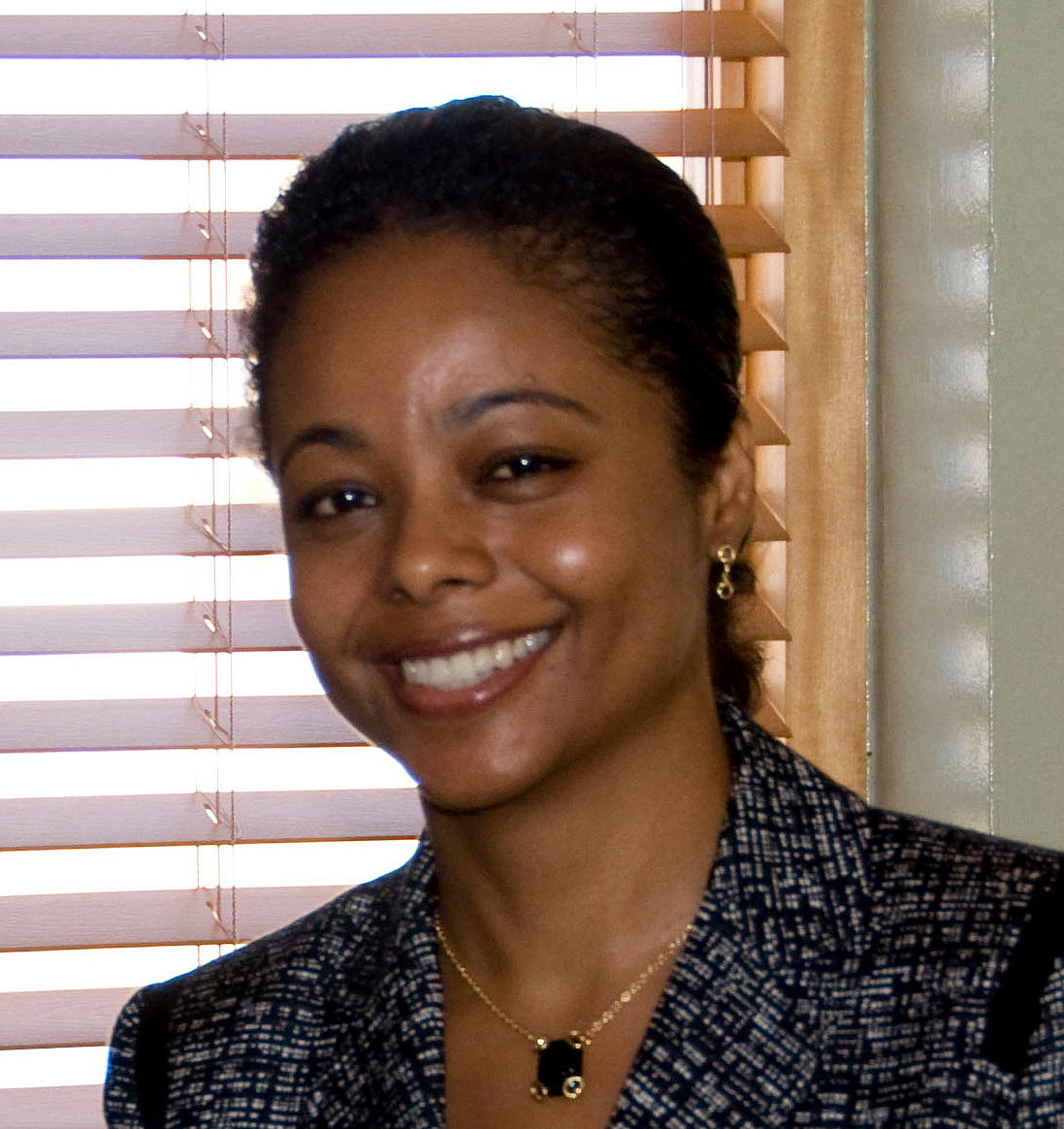
- Forte in 2010.

Minister of Legal and Constitutional Affairs
- In office January 2022 – September 2025

Attorney General of Jamaica
- In office 7 March 2016 – 10 January 2022
- Prime Minister: Andrew Holness
- Preceded by: Patrick Atkinson
- Succeeded by: Derrick McKoy

Member of Parliament for Saint James West Central
- Incumbent
- Assumed office March 2016
- Preceded by: Sharon Ffolkes-Abrahams

Personal details
- Born: Marlene Patricia Malahoo; 14 February 1966 (age 60)
- Spouse: Ian Forte
- Education: Harvard University (MPA); Norman Manley Law School; University of the West Indies

Marlene Patricia Malahoo Forte (born 14 February 1966) is a Jamaican politician. She was the Minister of Legal and Constitutional Affairs from January 2022, until September 2025 when the role was terminated. She also was the Attorney General of Jamaica from 7 March 2016 to 10 January 2022. She served as a Senator for the Jamaica Labour Party from 2009 to 2016, and served as State Minister of Foreign Affairs and Foreign Trade from 2009 to 2012. Prior to entering politics, she served as a Resident Magistrate.

Forte received her early education at the Manning's School in Savanna-la-Mar, Westmoreland. She studied at the University of the West Indies, Norman Manley Law School and King's College London (LLM, 1999), obtained a master's degree in public administration from the Kennedy School of Government at Harvard University, and has lectured in criminal practice and procedure at the Norman Manley Law School.

Forte was elected to the House of Representatives as MP for Saint James West Central in March 2016 after the Jamaica Labour Party won the 2016 general election on 25 February by one seat.

In June 2016, Forte criticized the U.S. Embassy in Jamaica for flying a rainbow flag following the Orlando nightclub shooting. Forte said it was "disrespectful of Jamaica's laws". Forte's comments were in turn criticized by others.

She used the Coronation of Charles III and Camilla to emphasise the Jamaican government's intention to transition to being a republic as early as 2024, and that the coronation had accelerated the government's plans for a referendum on the subject. On 11 December 2024, she presented a bill in Parliament to abolish the monarchy and make the country a republic
