= Saint James Parish, Jamaica =

Parish of Jamaica

Coordinates: 18°23′N 77°53′W

Saint James
- Parish
- Saint James in Jamaica
- Country: Jamaica
- County: Cornwall
- Capital: Montego Bay
- Major towns: Adelphi, Cambridge, Montpelier, Catadupa, Fairfield, Somerton, Irwin, Granville, Dumfries, Bogue

Area
  - Total: 595 km^{2} (230 sq mi)
  - Rank: 11

Population (2012)
  - Total: 184,662
  - Density: 310/km^{2} (804/sq mi)

St. James is a suburban parish, located on the north-west end of the island of Jamaica in the county of Cornwall. Its capital is Montego Bay (derived from the Spanish word manteca (lard) because hogs were cultivated there, from which lard was made). Montego Bay was officially named the second city of Jamaica, behind Kingston, in 1981, although Montego Bay became a city in 1980 through an act of the Jamaican Parliament. The parish is the birthplace of the Right Excellent Samuel Sharpe (died 1833), one of Jamaica's seven National Heroes.

== History ==
When the Spanish occupied Jamaica, Montego Bay was an export point for lard, which was obtained from wild hogs in the forests. In many of the early maps of Jamaica, Montego Bay was listed as "Bahia de Manteca" (Lard Bay). The parish was given the name "St. James" in honour of King James II by Sir Thomas Modyford, the island's first English Governor. At the beginning of the English rule, the parish was one of the poorest; it had no towns, few inhabitants and little commerce, except for the exported lard. However, after the treaty with the Maroons in 1739, St. James became one of the most important sugar-producing parishes. Annually, more than 150 ships arrived in Montego Bay bringing slaves and supplies, and taking sugar. Commerce developed as wealthy merchants and planters erected many elaborate town houses. In 1773, Montego Bay had the only newspaper outside of Kingston - The Cornwall Chronicle.

Fire, in 1795 and again in 1811, destroyed much of Montego Bay. After being rebuilt, it was again destroyed in 1831 by a rebellion led by Sam Sharpe. This rebellion was as a result of slave owners' reluctance to free the slaves, even after England proposed an end to slavery. Sam Sharpe had advocated passive resistance but this was met by violence. As a result, a group of slaves responded in turn with and began setting fire to buildings and the surrounding plantations and cane fields. As a result of being the main planner of the rebellion, Sam Sharpe was hanged in the Montego Bay market place, which is today known as Sam Sharpe Square.

After emancipation in 1834, the fortunes of the town and parish declined until the banana trade was promoted by J. E. Kerr and Co. This prompted the start of tourism in Jamaica. A Freeport was constructed in the 1960s, and later, a cruise ship terminal was opened. Montego Bay was accorded city status on 1 May 1980. The Sangster International Airport, the busiest airport in Jamaica and the Anglophone Caribbean and one of two international airports on the island, is located in Montego Bay.

== Geography ==
The parish is bordered by Trelawny in the east, St. Elizabeth in the south and Hanover and Westmoreland in the west. It covers an area of 594.9 km^{2}, making it one of the smallest parishes in Jamaica. The population was 184,662 in 2012.

About two-thirds of the parish consists of limestone. The Nassau Mountains, which rise from St. Elizabeth, south of the parish, extend diagonally across St. James. The range then declines to a point just south of Montego Bay. Its highest point is approximately 1524 metres above sea level.

Great River, which serves as the boundary between St. James and its neighboring parishes Hanover and Westmoreland, and the Montego River, which rises in central St. James and flows north, then west to Montego Bay, are the two main rivers.

The city of Montego Bay may be roughly divided into two sections: the tourist area, which occupies the northern section of the bay along the shore line, and the commercial and industrial sections, which are second only to Kingston in size and volume of trade.

== Politics ==
Saint James Parish has five MPs based in five constituencies; Saint James Central, Saint James East Central, Saint James North Western, Saint James Southern and Saint James West Central.

== Commerce ==
Today, Saint James is one of the fastest growing parishes on the island with large credits going to Montego Bay, because it is seen as an alternative to the overpopulated Kingston and Saint Andrew Corporate Area.

Agricultural activities include forestry, and the production of sugar cane and other domestic crops. There are approximately 60 manufacturing establishments in the south of the parish, mainly for garment, woodwork, and food processing. There are also many industrial zones, including The Montego Free Zone, Bogue Industrial Estate and Ironshore.

Tourism is the main source of employment in the parish; one in four persons are employed in tourism. The major forms of employment in tourism are:

1. craft vending in one of the three craft markets in the parish, Harbour Street Craft Market, Old Fort Craft Market and Success Craft Market;
2. tour bus operating for such companies as JUTA and JCAL tours; and,
3. various positions in the many hotels located in the parish. Over 500,000 tourists annually visit St. James, and this accounts for one-third of the revenue generated by tourism islandwide; Montego Bay is often called the Mecca of tourism in Jamaica.

== Hotels ==
There are many famous hotels located in the parish of St. James, most of them in the Rose Hall area, including Doctors Cave Beach Hotel, Riu Hotels, Wyndham Rose Hall, Sandals and Beaches Resorts, the Ritz Carlton Hotel, Hyatt Ziva, Riu, Holiday Inn, Half Moon Hotel and the Iberostar Hotel located in Lilliput.

=== Sites ===
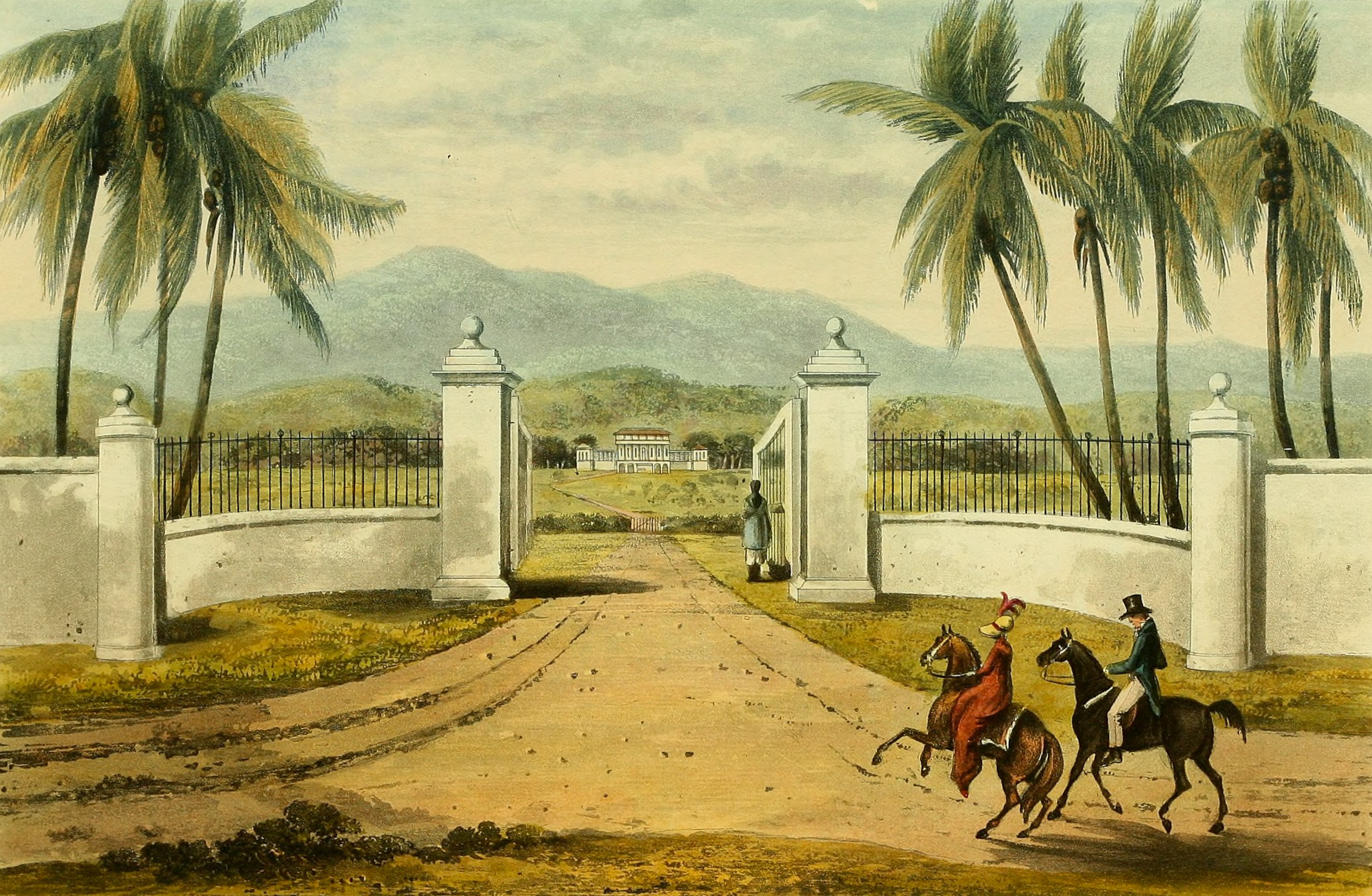
Rose Hall Plantation 1821

- Rose Hall Great house is the most famous in the parish. It was built on a hill two miles (3 km) east of Ironshore in 1770 by John Palmer, the Custos of St. James, who named the house after his wife, Rose. The house attracts over 100,000 visitors per year, attracted by the legend of 'The White Witch Of Rose Hall', who allegedly murdered all three of her husbands, before being strangled by her slaves. The story that her ghost still haunts the property is still promoted. John Rollins, a wealthy American, bought the property in 1966, and restored the house to its former grandeur.
- Sam Sharpe Square is located in the centre of town. It displays a life-sized sculpture of Sam Sharpe and his men during the Christmas rebellion in 1831.
- The Creek Dome, or ‘the Dome’ is located at the corner of Creek Street and Dome Street in downtown Montego Bay. Built in 1836, the Dome was built to protect the head of el Rio de Camarones (The River of Crabs) which served as the only source of Montego Bay's water supply until 1894. Up to the late 1960s, the dome was utilized as an emergency resource of water in times of drought. Today, there is no longer water underneath the Dome. The Jamaica National Heritage Trust declared the Creek Dome a national historic monument.
- Old Fort was built in 1774 to protect the town. The old cannon is still pointing out to sea.
- The Cage was a jail for recaptured runaway slaves. It is now used as a tourist information centre and museum.
- St. James is noted for its fine beaches, which include Greenwood, Rose Hall, Ironshore, Mahoe Bay, Aquasol Theme Park, Doctor's Cave, Cornwall Beach, Montego Freeport and Spring Gardens.

== Notable people ==
- Alia Atkinson, multiple time Olympian in swimming.
- Kenneth Baugh, Jamaican politician and surgeon, who served as Jamaica's Minister of Health.
- Yohan Blake, Jamaican sprinter (as of September 2011) the second fastest man over 200 metres in history behind fellow Jamaican Usain Bolt.
- Jimmy Cliff, ska and reggae singer, musician and actor; inducted into the Rock and Roll Hall of Fame in 2010.
- Howard Cooke, former Governor-General of Jamaica.
- Abdullah el-Faisal, Muslim cleric who preached in the UK until imprisoned for stirring up hatred; deported to Jamaica in 2007.
- Tony Hart, Jamaican businessman, philanthropist, and politician.
- Andre Haughton, Jamaican economist and politician.
- Herbert Eldemire, Jamaican politician and medical doctor. former Minister of Health
- Vincent HoSang, Businessman and Philanthropist.
- Rowland Phillips, Jamaican judge, former Chief Justice of Jamaica from 1963 to 1968.
- Max Romeo, Jamaican reggae musician.
- Garth Taylor, Jamaican ophthalmologist, professor, and humanitarian.
- Donnette Zacca (1957), Jamaican photographer, lecturer, and artist.
- Jourdaine Fletcher, Jamaican professional footballer.
