= Sharon Ffolkes-Abrahams =

Jamaican attorney-at-law and politician

Sharon Annette Ffolkes-Abrahams

Minister of State in the Ministry of Industry, Investment and Commerce
- In office 5 January 2012 – 3 March 2016
- Monarch: Elizabeth II
- Governor General: Sir Patrick Allen
- Prime Minister: Portia Simpson-Miller
- Succeeded by: Floyd Green

Member of Parliament for Saint James West Central
- In office 2012–2016
- Preceded by: Clive Mullings
- Succeeded by: Marlene Malahoo Forte

Personal details
- Born: Kingston, Jamaica
- Party: People's National Party
- Spouse: Peter Abrahams
- Education: University of the West Indies

Sharon Annette Ffolkes-Abrahams is a Jamaican attorney-at-law and politician who served as member of parliament and Minister of State in the Ministry of Industry, Investment and Commerce from 2012 to 2016.

== Early life and education ==
Ffolkes-Abrahams is the daughter of Eugene Ffolkes and Greta Ffolkes. She received her early education at the Immaculate Conception High School in Kingston, Jamaica. She is a graduate of the University of the West Indies, Cave Hill, Barbados, where she obtained her first degree in law.

== Career ==
=== Legal career ===
Ffolkes-Abrahams was called to the Jamaican Bar in 1981. She moved to Canada, where she qualified for the Bar at Osgoode Hall Law School and was called to the Ontario Bar on 18 April 1985. She received her master's degree in administrative law in 2003 from Osgoode Hall Law School, York University. Ffolkes-Abrahams is a trained human rights lawyer who has practiced in Ontario courts and tribunals in the areas of immigration, human rights and criminal law. She is a former legal counsel with both the Ontario Human Rights Commission and the Advocacy Resource Centre for the Handicapped (ARCH). She is a former member of the York Region Accessibility Advisory Committee under the Ontarians with Disabilities Act. Upon her return home to Jamaica and prior to entering representational politics, she lectured in law at the University of Technology in Montego Bay.

=== Political career ===
Ffolkes-Abrahams was first elected to the House of Representatives in 2011 from the Saint James West Central constituency, representing the People's National Party. She was Minister of State in the Ministry of Tourism in the government of prime minister Portia Simpson-Miller from 2012 to 2016.

== Personal life ==
Ffolkes-Abrahams is married to Peter Abrahams. The couple have three children.

== See also ==
- Women in the House of Representatives of Jamaica
- List of female members of the House of Representatives of Jamaica
