= Kenneth Baugh =

Jamaican politician and surgeon (1941–2019)

Dr. The Honourable Kenneth Baugh OJ
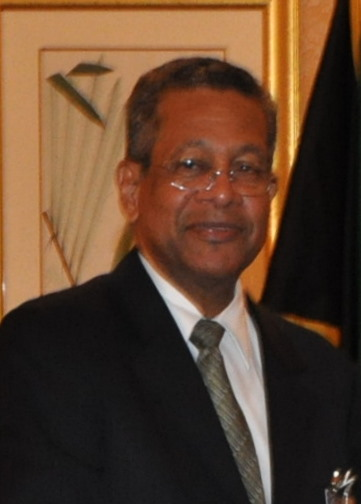

Deputy Prime Minister of Jamaica
- In office September 2007 – January 2012
- Prime Minister: Bruce Golding; Andrew Holness
- Preceded by: Vacant
- Succeeded by: Peter Phillips

Leader of the Opposition
- In office 21 January 2005 – 24 January 2005
- Prime Minister: P.J. Patterson
- Preceded by: Edward Seaga
- Succeeded by: Bruce Golding
Early political career
Minister of Foreign Affairs and Trade
In office 2007–2011
Preceded by	Anthony Hylton
Succeeded by	Arnold Joseph Nicholson
Member of Parliament for Saint James North Western
In office 1989–1993
Preceded by	Howard Cooke
Succeeded by	Carl Miller
Member of Parliament for Saint Catherine West Central
In office 1997–2016
Prime Minister	P.J. Patterson; Portia Simpson-Miller; Bruce Golding; Andrew Holness
Minister of Health
In office 1980–1989
Preceded by	Douglas Manley
Succeeded by	Easton Douglas

Personal details
- Born: Kenneth Lee O'Neil Baugh; 24 February 1941 Montego Bay, Jamaica
- Died: 1 September 2019 (aged 78)
- Party: Jamaica Labour Party

Kenneth Lee O'Neil Baugh, OJ (24 February 1941 – 1 September 2019) was a Jamaican politician and surgeon. A member of the Jamaica Labour Party, he served as Deputy Prime Minister, Minister of Foreign Affairs and Foreign Trade, and Minister of Health.

== Early life ==
Kenneth Lee O'Neil Baugh was born on 24 February 1941 in Montego Bay, St. James, Jamaica. He attended Cornwall College and the University of the West Indies. Before entering politics, Baugh worked as a surgeon and Senior Medical Officer at the Cornwall Regional Hospital.

== Career ==
Baugh served as general secretary and chairman of the Jamaica Labour Party. He represented Saint James North Western as a Member of Parliament from 1980 to 1989, then as a senator from 1989 to 1993. From 1997 till his retirement in 2016, Baugh was a Member of Parliament for West Central St. Catherine. Baugh also held various ministerial portfolios, including Minister of Health (1980–1989) and Minister of Foreign Affairs and Foreign Trade (2007–2011). In his first speech at the United Nations General Assembly (UNGA), Baugh "lustily condemned" how the European Union negotiated the Economic Partnership Agreements (EPA).

== Later years and death ==
Baugh retired from politics in 2015 due to ill health. He had brain surgery later that year. Baugh died on 1 September 2019 from a long illness at the age of 78. An official funeral for Baugh was approved by the Cabinet of Jamaica on 9 September. The service was held at the University Chapel at The University of the West Indies in Mona, St. Andrews.

== Recognition ==
In 2016, Baugh was awarded the Order of Jamaica for his political contributions to Jamaica. In October 2019, following Baugh's death, the Point Hill Medical Centre was renamed after him.
