= Herbert Atkinson Barker =

English surgeon (1869-1950)

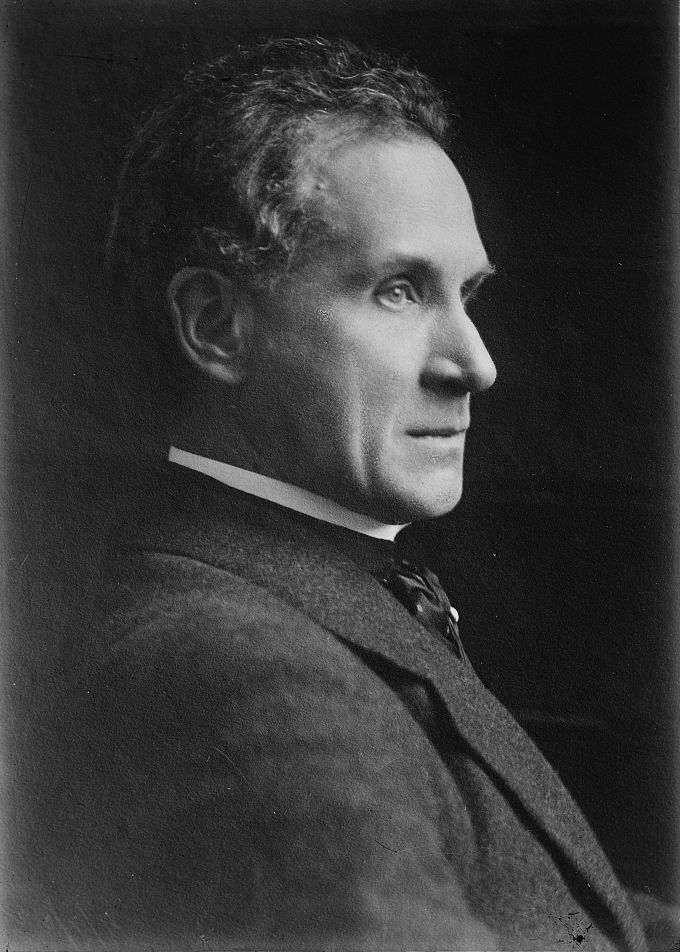
- Born: 21 April 1869
- Died: 21 July 1950 (aged 81)
- Known for: osteopathic
- Scientific career
- Fields: manipulative surgeon

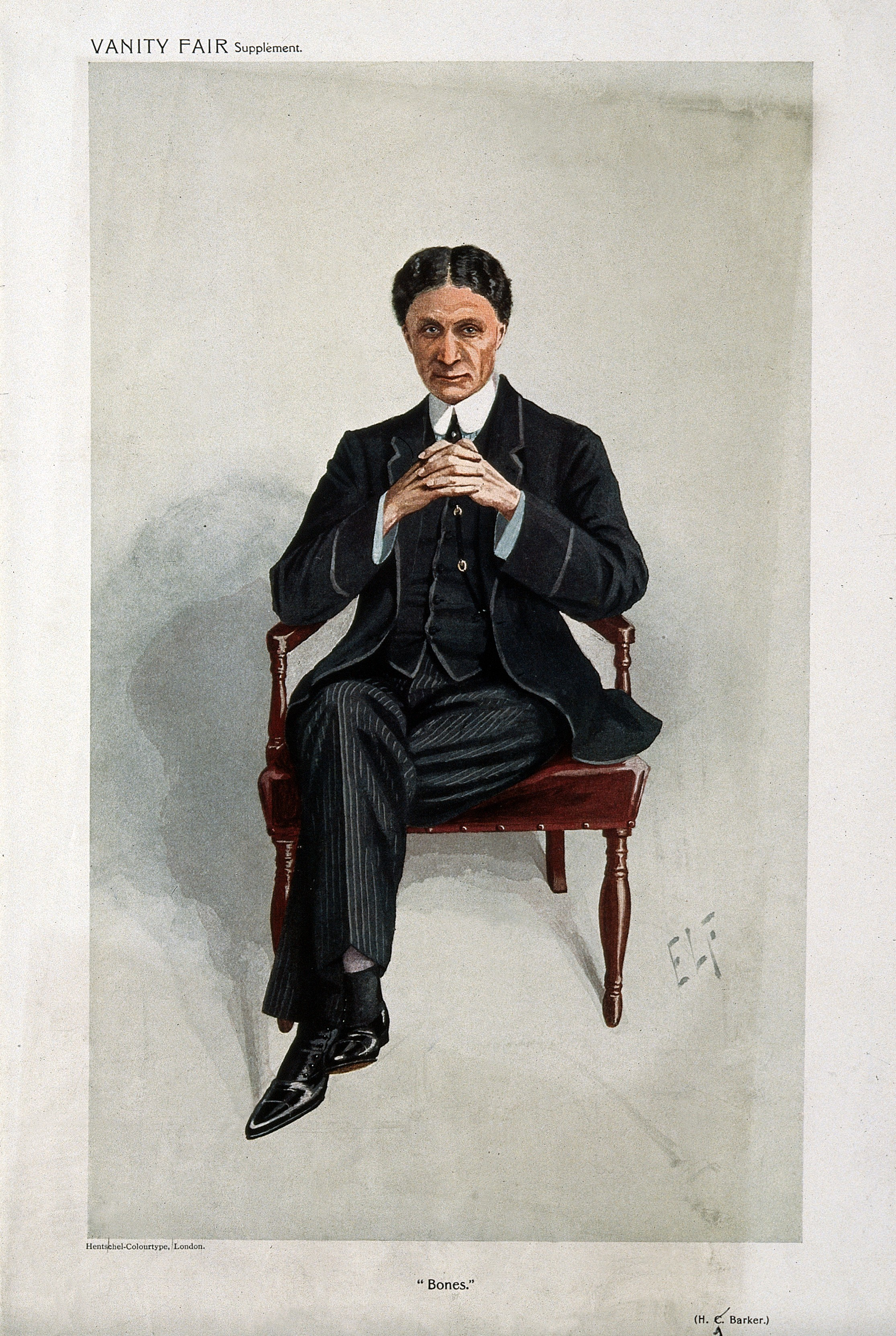
Men of the Day portrait in Vanity Fair, 1909.

Sir Herbert Atkinson Barker (21 April 1869 – 21 July 1950) was an English manipulative surgeon. He developed a highly successful technique, specialising in knee and other damaged joints both in the top sportsmen and the general public. He advocated the avoidance of surgery. However, his methods were never formally approved by the medical establishment. Because of opposition towards a Lambeth degree or honorary degree for him, he was instead honored with a knighthood in 1922, nominally for services in World War I.

In the 1920s he visited Doctor's Cave Beach Club in Montego Bay, Jamaica, and was most impressed by the curative powers of the waters. His subsequent articles about the beach lead to it becoming a popular destination for those seeking cures, and this was the start of the tourist industry in Montego Bay.

He wrote Leaves from My Life: Reminiscences by the famous Manipulative Surgeon, published in 1927.
