= Andre Haughton =

Jamaican economist and politician

Opposition Senator

University Lecturer
- Incumbent
- Assumed office April 26, 2019

Personal details
- Citizenship: Jamaica
- Children: 2
- Education: University of the West Indies- (BSc) (MSc) The University of Essex (PhD)
- Alma mater: Cornwall College

Andre Haughton is a Jamaican economist and politician.

Haughton was raised in Mount Salem, Saint James Parish, and attended Cornwall College before earning his master's degree in economics at the University of the West Indies, Mona. Haughton taught at UWI for two years, then began doctoral studies at the University of Essex, funded by the British Commonwealth Scholarship. Upon completing his doctoral degree, Haughton resumed teaching at UWI. He was later appointed a member of the board for the Students’ Loan Bureau.

In January 2019, Haughton accepted a nomination as People's National Party parliamentary candidate for Saint James West Central. On 14 April 2019, Haughton was appointed to the Senate of Jamaica to replace Noel Sloley. Haughton was sworn into office as a senator on 26 April 2019.
