= China–Jamaica relations =

- China: Jamaica

Diplomatic relations between China and Jamaica were established on 21 November 1972. The Chinese government established an embassy in Kingston in 1973. There was no formal representation from Jamaica to China until 1992, when the Jamaican ambassador to Tokyo, Japan was accredited as a non-resident ambassador to Beijing. Jamaica later established a formal embassy in Beijing, and the current ambassador is Courtenay Rattray. The current Chinese ambassador to Jamaica is Chen Jinghua. In 2007, China announced it would provide technical training for more than 2,000 Jamaicans in 2008. A growing number of Jamaican products have been promoted through the China International Import Expo (CIIE) and gained interest in the Chinese market.

In 2014 China Harbour Engineering Company (CHEC) opened the 67 kilometre Jamaica North South Highway.

Jamaica joined the Belt and Road Initiative (BRI) in 2019.

In 2021, Prime Minister Andrew Holness announced furtherance of a technology partnership with Huawei which had increased its investment in the Jamaican economy.

== See also ==
- Chinese Jamaicans
