= Jamaica Workers and Tradesmen's Union =

General union in Jamaica

The Jamaica Workers and Tradesmen's Union (JWTU) was a general union in Jamaica.

The union was established in 1937, by Allan Coombs, and the Marxist Hugh Clifford Buchanan. Soon after, Percy A. Aiken led a breakaway, the Builders and Allied Trade Union.

Alexander Bustamante joined the union, and soon became prominent by writing letters to the press regarding a strike wave in Jamaica. In 1937, he was appointed as the union's treasurer. However, at the end of the year, he demanded that the union's president should resign, in order that he could take up the post. He was expelled from the union, and founded the rival Bustamante Industrial Trade Union.

The JWTU survived the splits, but was weakened. By the start of 1939, it had only 946 members. Its main area of strength was among port workers in Montego Bay. In February 1939, Bustamante led a campaign to recruit those workers to his union, culminating in a national strike in the industry. This led to the dissolution of the JWTU.
