= Heroy Clarke =

Jamaican politician

Heroy Clarke MP

Deputy Speaker of the Jamaica House of Representatives
- Incumbent
- Assumed office September 2025

Member of the Jamaican Parliament for Saint James Central
- Incumbent
- Assumed office 2016
- Preceded by: Lloyd B. Smith

Personal details
- Party: Jamaica Labour Party
- Education: Cornwall College, Jamaica

Heroy Anthony Clarke, was first elected on February 25, 2016 and is currently serving his second term as a Member of Parliament in the St. James Central Constituency. He was Vice President of the JLP’s youth arm, Young Jamaica from 1996-2000 and JLP Councillor for Montego Bay South East (Rose Heights) Division (1998)Heroy Clarke is a Jamaican politician from the Labour Party.

He became the Deputy Speaker of the House of Representatives on 2025.

Education: Cornwall College, Associate Degree in Business, UCC and completed his LLB at UTech Ja.
