= Bamboo, Jamaica =

Settlement in Jamaica

Coordinates: 18.3851°N 77.2662°W

Location of Bamboo in Jamaica

Bamboo is a settlement in The Saint Ann Parish, Jamaica. Its population as of a 1991 census was 3,732 inhabitants.

The Hill Top Juvenile Correctional Centre of the Department of Correctional Services, Jamaica is located in Bamboo.

Bamboo used to be known as Little Kent.
