= Alexandria, Jamaica =

Alexandria
- Town
- Location within Jamaica
- Coordinates: 18°17′54″N 77°21′27″W
- Country: Jamaica
- Parish: Saint Ann
- Elevation: 648 m (2,125 ft)

Population (1991)
  - Total: 1,672
  - Estimate (2010): 1,957
- Time zone: UTC-5 (EST)

Alexandria is a town in the parish of Saint Ann, Jamaica.

The Armadale Juvenile Correctional Centre of the Department of Correctional Services, Jamaica was located in Alexandria. On May 22, 2009, a fire went through the facility, killing 5 girls and injuring 13. The replacement facility is located in Diamond Crest Villa near Alligator Pond in Manchester Parish.
