= Kenneth McNeill =

Jamaican political figure and surgeon

The Honourable Kenneth McNeill OJ MD MP

MP for Saint Andrew East Central
- In office 1969–1977

Minister of Health
- In office 1972–1977
- Preceded by: Herbert Eldemire
- Succeeded by: Douglas Manley

Minister of Public Service
- In office 1977–1980

Personal details
- Born: 1938
- Died: 2001 (Aged 83)
- Children: Wykeham McNeill

Kenneth McNeill, MD, MP, OJ (1918 – 2001), was a Jamaican political figure and a renowned surgeon. He died at the age of 83 in Jamaica. He is the father of five children including present politician Wykeham McNeill.

== Political career ==
He first entered Parliament as a Senator in 1962, and between 1969 and 1977 served as Member of Parliament for East Central St. Andrew, and then for the Northwest St. Andrew constituency. He held several ministries including Health and Environmental Control, the Public Service and Minister of Parliamentary Affairs.

== Awards ==
In 1977 he was awarded the Order of Jamaica for his public service.

== Death ==
The political community including members of the House of Representatives were shocked when Deputy House Leader Terry Gillette announced his death and a number of tributes ensued. "Prime Minister P.J. Patterson said he had a feeling of profound loss on hearing the news. He said Dr. McNeill had come from a family that had made substantial contribution to the country."
