= Doctor's Cave Beach Club =

- Beach
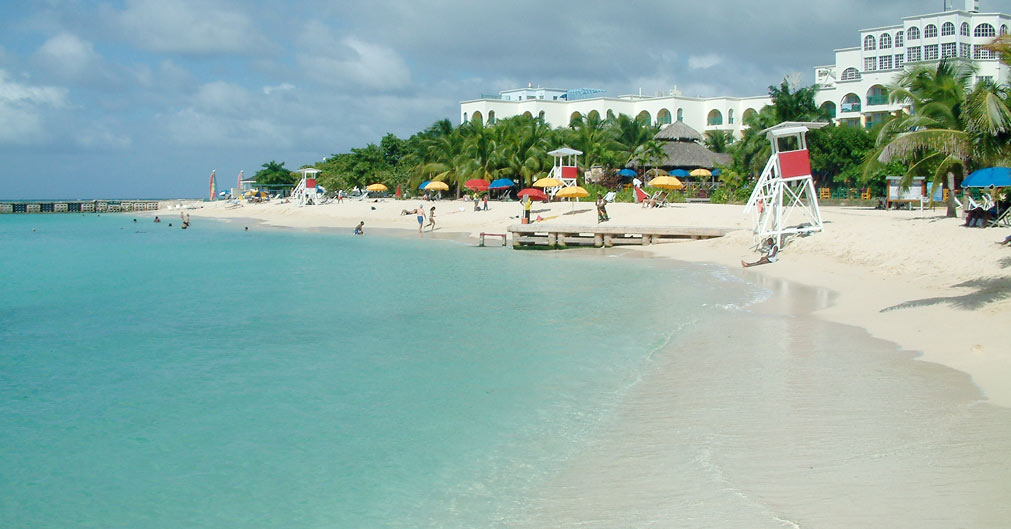
- Doctor's Cave Beach Club

- Location within Jamaica
- Coordinates: 18.4870778°N 77.9294318°W
- Country: Jamaica
- Parish: St James
- Time zone: UTC-5 (EST)

Doctor's Cave Beach Club, located in Montego Bay, Jamaica, is a beach. It is part of the protected Montego Bay Marine Park.

== History ==
Alexander James McCatty founded a sanatorium in Montego Bay in 1880. He allowed his friends to bathe at his small beach, which was entered through a cave. In 1906, he donated the property, and the private members club was formed, which still exists. In the 1920s, Herbert Barker, an English osteopath, visited the beach and wrote an article which helped the beach become well-known.

== See also ==
- List of beaches in Jamaica
