= Horace Chang =

Jamaican politician

The Honourable Dr Horace Chang OJ CD MP

Deputy Prime Minister of Jamaica
- Incumbent
- Assumed office 7 September 2020
- Prime Minister: Andrew Holness
- Preceded by: Kenneth Baugh (2012)

Minister of National Security
- Incumbent
- Assumed office 26 March 2018
- Prime Minister: Andrew Holness
- Preceded by: Robert Montague

Member of Parliament
- Incumbent
- Assumed office 2002
- Constituency: Saint James North Western
- In office 1980–1989
- Preceded by: Roy Robinson
- Succeeded by: Benjamin Clare
- Constituency: Hanover Western

General Secretary of Jamaican Labour Party
- Incumbent
- Assumed office 1976
- President: Andrew Holness

Personal details
- Born: Horace Anthony Chang; 10 November 1952 (age 73) Westmoreland Parish, Jamaica
- Party: JLP
- Spouse: Paulette Chang (m. 1978)
- Education: Cornwall College; University of the West Indies

Horace Anthony Chang (born 10 November 1952) is a Jamaican doctor and politician who is both the current Deputy Prime Minister of Jamaica and the Minister of National Security. He was formerly the Minister of Water, Environment, and Housing from September 2007 to December 2011.

== Early life ==
Chang was born on 10 November 1952 in New Roads, Westmoreland, Jamaica. He attended the New Roads All-age School, Cornwall College, and the University of the West Indies. In university, Chang was the president of the Guild of Undergraduates and led the University Games Committee. During this time, he solved the organisation's financial problems and re-established a relationship with their Cuban counterparts.

== Career ==
Trained as a medical doctor, Chang entered politics in 1976 as a member of the Jamaica Labour Party (JLP). He was a youth leader in East Rural St. Andrew and the vice-president of Young Jamaica. In 1980, at age 27, he was elected to the parliament as a representative of Hanover Western, serving until 1989. From 1980 to 1986, Chang worked in the Ministry of Health as the Parliamentary Secretary. In 2002, he was elected as a Member of Parliament for Saint James North Western. From 2007 to 2011, Chang served as Minister of Housing, Environment, Water, and Local Government. In this direction, the National Housing Development Corporation of Jamaica was renamed as the Housing Agency of Jamaica. During his tenure as minister, Chang also spearheaded the US$211 million Jamaica Water Supply Improvement Project (JWSDIP), the largest project of its kind before. Chang has served as the Minister of National Security since March 2018 and as Deputy Prime Minister since September 2020.

== Personal life ==
Chang and his wife Paulette have two children. He is an avid reader and domino player.

== Recognition ==
In January 2020, the Quebec Avenue roadway in Montego Bay was renamed to Dr Horace Chang Boulevard. At the renaming ceremony, Mayor Homer Davis praised Chang as "a man for all seasons, a man who is a true and humble servant of not just the people of St James, but Jamaica, the Caribbean and the world".
