= Henry Vernon Wong =

American physicist

- Born: December 4, 1938; Montego Bay, Colony of Jamaica, British Empire
- Citizenship: United States^{[explain status]}
- Education: University of the West Indies (B.S.); Oxford University (D.Phil.)
- Known for: Plasma physics
- Spouse: Dorit Wong (née Stebbing)
- Awards: Fellow of the American Physical Society
- Scientific career
- Fields: Physics
- Workplaces: University of Texas, Austin
- Thesis: (1964)

Henry Vernon Wong is a Jamaican-American physicist known for his work in plasma physics. He is professor emeritus at the University of Texas, Austin.

== Career ==
Wong's early education was at Cornwall College in Montego Bay, Jamaica. He won a Jamaica Scholarship to the University of the West Indies, graduating with a B.Sc. in physics in 1961. He obtained his D.Phil. in nuclear physics from Wadham College, Oxford in 1964. Wong remained at Oxford during 1964–1965 as a postdoctoral scholar. In 1965, he was the recipient of a CIBA Fellowship to continue his research at the International Centre for Theoretical Physics in Trieste, Italy. The following year he joined the Laboratoria Gas Ionizzati in Rome. In 1967, Wong joined the Fusion Research Center (FRC) of the University of Texas at Austin as a research scientist.

== Awards and honors ==
- In 1961, Wong was awarded a Rhodes Scholarship to Wadham College, Oxford
- In 1988, He was elected fellow of the American Physical Society.

== Selected publications ==
- Wong, H. Vernon. "Stability of Bernstein‐Greene‐Kruskal Wave with Small Fraction of Trapped Electrons" The Physics of Fluids 15, 632 (1972); DOI:10.1063/1.1693958
- Wong, H. Vernon. "Sideband instabilities in free electron lasers" Physics of Fluids B: Plasma Physics, 2 1635 (1990). DOI:10.1063/1.859489
- Wong, H. Vernon. "Particle canonical variables and guiding center Hamiltonian up to second order in the Larmor radius" Physics of Plasmas 7, 73 (2000). DOI:10.1063/1.873782
- Wong, H. Vernon. "Nonlinear finite-Larmor-radius drift-kinetic equation" Physics of Plasmas 12, 112305 (2005). DOI:10.1063/1.2116867
