= Saint James Central =

Jamaican parliamentary constituency

Saint James Central is a parliamentary constituency represented in the House of Representatives of the Jamaican Parliament. It elects one Member of Parliament (MP) by the first past the post system of election. The constituency was first contested in the 1967 general election. The current MP is Heroy Clarke of the Jamaica Labour Party who has been in office since 2016.

== Boundaries ==
The constituency covers four electoral divisions – sections of Montego Bay North, Montego Bay South, Montego Bay West and Montego Bay South East, as well as Salt Spring.

== Members of Parliament ==
=== 1967 to 1976 ===
Election	Member	Party
1967	Herbert Eldemire	Jamaica Labour Party
1972	Francis Tulloch	People's National Party
1976	Constituency abolished	

=== 2011 to present ===
Election	Member	Party
2011	Lloyd B. Smith	People's National Party
2016	Heroy Clarke	Jamaica Labour Party
2020	Heroy Clarke	Jamaica Labour Party

== Elections ==
=== Elections from 2000 to Present ===
General Election 2020: Saint James Central
Party	Candidate	Votes	%	±%
JLP	Heroy Clarke	6,456	64.0	▲6.6
PNP	Andre Hylton	3,607	35.8	▼5.6
Independent	Astor Black	23	0.2	
Turnout		10,086		
Registered electors				
JLP hold				

General Election 2016: Saint James Central
Party	Candidate	Votes	%	±%
JLP	Heroy Clarke	6,887	57.4	▲8.1
PNP	Ashley-Ann Foster	4,968	41.4	▼8.7
Turnout		11,991	42.8	▼2.6
Registered electors		28,018		▲12.1
JLP gain from PNP				

General Election 2011: Saint James Central
Party	Candidate	Votes	%	±%
PNP	Lloyd B. Smith	5,683	50.1	
JLP	Heroy Clarke	5,585	49.3	
Turnout		11,337	45.4	
Registered electors		24,991		
PNP win (new seat)				

=== Elections from 1962 to 1979 ===
General Election 1972: Saint James Central
Party	Candidate	Votes	%	±%
PNP	Francis Tulloch	6.356	60.6	▲15.6
JLP	Tony Hart	4,101	39.1	▼15.3
Turnout		10,487	82.2	▼2.5
Registered electors		12,761		▲21.9
PNP gain from JLP				

General Election 1967: Saint James Central
Party	Candidate	Votes	%	±%
JLP	Herbert Eldemire	4,820	54.4	
PNP	Herbert Morrison	3,986	45.0	
Turnout		8,866	84.7	
Registered electors		10,471		
JLP win (new seat)				

== See also ==
- Politics of Jamaica
- Elections in Jamaica
