= Cornwall Regional Hospital =

- Western Regional Health Authority

Geography
- Location: Mount Salem, Montego Bay, Jamaica
- Coordinates: 18°28′11″N 77°54′36″W

Organisation
- Type: District general

Services
- Standards: Type "A"
- Emergency department: Yes, Accident & Emergency (A&E)
- Beds: 400

History
- Opened: 1974

Links
- Website: http://cornwallregionalhospital.com/
- Other links: List of hospitals in Jamaica

Cornwall Regional Hospital is a public hospital in Montego Bay, Jamaica, located in the Mount Salem district. It is the main hospital in western Jamaica. The hospital is operated by the Western Regional Health Authority on behalf of the Ministry of Health, Jamaica.

== History ==
The hospital was designed by The Architects Collaborative (TAC) of Cambridge, Massachusetts. Construction of Cornwall Regional Hospital was completed in 1972, but the hospital was not opened to the public until May 10, 1974. Cornwall Regional Hospital serves approximately 18,000 outpatients and 73,000 emergency room visits per year. The hospital was named after Cornwall County, Jamaica, in which it is located.

== Services ==
The services offered by the hospital include:

- Accident & Emergency (A&E)
- General Surgery
- Paediatrics
- Orthopaedics
- Obstretics & Gynaecology (O&G)
- Ear, Nose & Throat (ENT)
- Psychiatry
- Ophthalmology (Eye)
- Plastic and Re-Constructive Service
- Dermatology
- Critical Care (ICU)
- Urology
- Renal Dialysis
- Outpatient Clinics
- Medical Laboratory
- Radiation Oncology
- Radiotherapy
- Radiology (X-Ray)
- Pediatric Surgery
- Dietary
- Physiotherapy
- Pharmacy

== Awards ==
- 2013, Prime Minister's Trophy for the "Best Customer Service Entity – Single Location"

== Notable people ==
- Dr Ken Baugh, former surgeon and Senior Medical Officer
