= Saint James North Western =

Parliamentary constituency of Jamaica

Saint James North Western is a parliamentary constituency represented in the House of Representatives of the Jamaican Parliament. It elects one Member of Parliament (MP) by the first past the post system of election. It was one of the 32 constituencies fixed in the new constitution granted to Jamaica in 1944. The constituency has featured in all 16 contested Parliamentary General Elections from 1944 to 2016. The current MP is the Hon. Dr. Horace Chang, representing the Jamaica Labour Party, who has been in office since 2002.

== Boundaries ==
The constituency covers four electoral divisions – sections of Montego Bay North, Montego Bay North East, Montego Bay West and all of Montego Bay Central. This encompasses the Flankers, Glendevon, Norwood, and Albion areas of Montego Bay.

== Members of Parliament ==
=== 1944 to Present ===
Election	Member	Party
1944	Iris Collins	Jamaica Labour Party
1949	Alan Coombs	People's National Party
1955	Alan Coombs	People's National Party
1959	Alan Coombs	People's National Party
1962	Herbert Eldemire	Jamaica Labour Party
1967	Howard Cooke	People's National Party
1972	Howard Cooke	People's National Party
1976	Howard Cooke	People's National Party
1980	Kenneth Baugh	Jamaica Labour Party
1983	Kenneth Baugh	Jamaica Labour Party
1989	Carl Miller	People's National Party
1993	Carl Miller	People's National Party
1997	Francis Tulloch	People's National Party
2002	Horace Chang	Jamaica Labour Party
2007	Horace Chang	Jamaica Labour Party
2011	Horace Chang	Jamaica Labour Party
2016	Horace Chang	Jamaica Labour Party
2020	Horace Chang	Jamaica Labour Party

== Elections ==
=== Elections from 2000 to Present ===
General Election 2020: Saint James North Western
Party	Candidate	Votes	%	±%
JLP	Horace Chang	6,189	76.2	▲11.7
PNP	George Hamilton	1,931	23.8	▼10.9
Turnout		8,120		
Registered electors				
JLP hold				

General Election 2016: Saint James North Western
Party	Candidate	Votes	%	±%
JLP	Horace Chang	7,014	64.5	▲9.8
PNP	Henry McCurdy	3,771	34.7	▼10.1
Turnout		10,879	39.7	▼5.3
Registered electors		27,375		▲10.9
JLP hold				

General Election 2011: Saint James North Western
Party	Candidate	Votes	%	±%
JLP	Horace Chang	6,077	54.7	▼2.3
PNP	Henry McCurdy	4,977	44.8	▲2.4
Turnout		11,113	45.0	▼6.7
Registered electors		24,687		▼3.0
JLP hold				

General Election 2007: Saint James North Western
Party	Candidate	Votes	%	±%
JLP	Horace Chang	7,482	57.0	▲1.0
PNP	Henry McCurdy	5,569	42.4	▼1.2
Turnout		13,139	51.7	▼1.1
Registered electors		25,440		▼0.6
JLP hold				

General Election 2002: Saint James North Western
Party	Candidate	Votes	%	±%
JLP	Horace Chang	7,570	56.0	▲12.5
PNP	Gordon Brown	5,731	43.6	▼8.0
Turnout		13,519	52.8	▼2.7
Registered electors		25,600		▼7.7
JLP gain from PNP				

=== Elections from 1980 to 1999 ===
General Election 1997: Saint James North Western
Party	Candidate	Votes	%	±%
PNP	Francis Tulloch	7,943	51.6	▼3.0
JLP	Horace Chang	6,691	43.5	▼1.1
NDM	Pat Austin	551	3.6	
Independent	Kingsley Headley	41	0.3	
Independent	Hope Thelwell	28	0.2	
Turnout		19,381	55.5	▲4.8
Registered electors		27,719		▲51.1
PNP hold				

General Election 1993: Saint James North Western
Party	Candidate	Votes	%	±%
PNP	Carl Miller	5,071	54.6	▼3.9
JLP	Charles Sinclair	4,146	44.6	▲3.8
Turnout		9,295	50.7	▼21.7
Registered electors		18,347		▼11.2
PNP hold				

General Election 1989: Saint James North Western
Party	Candidate	Votes	%	±%
PNP	Carl Miller	8,753	58.5	
JLP	Charles Sinclair	6,108	40.8	
Turnout		14,959	72.4	
Registered electors		20,656		▲8.1
PNP gain from JLP				

General Election 1983: Saint James North Western
Party	Candidate	Votes	%	±%
JLP	Kenneth Baugh			
Turnout				
Registered electors		19,113		
JLP hold				

General Election 1980: Saint James North Western
Party	Candidate	Votes	%	±%
JLP	Kenneth Baugh	10,265	62.5	▲24.7
PNP	Howard Cooke	5,993	36.5	▼25.3
Turnout		16,438	86.0	▲35.3
Registered electors		19,113		▲29.3
JLP gain from PNP				

=== Elections from 1960 to 1979 ===
General Election 1976: Saint James North Western
Party	Candidate	Votes	%	±%
PNP	Howard Cooke	7,231	61.8	▼11.8
JLP	Geoffrey Roach	4,424	37.8	▲1.8
Turnout		11,695	50.7	▼27.7
Registered electors		14,781		▲20.7
PNP hold				

General Election 1972: Saint James North Western
Party	Candidate	Votes	%	±%
PNP	Howard Cooke	7,062	73.6	▲13.0
JLP	Hewart Henriques	2,492	26.0	▼13.1
Turnout		9,593	78.4	▼9.6
Registered electors		12,243		▲40.2
PNP hold				

General Election 1967: Saint James North Western
Party	Candidate	Votes	%	±%
PNP	Howard Cooke	4,654	60.6	▲12.7
JLP	Donat G. Crichton	3,003	39.1	▼11.1
Turnout		7,686	88.0	▲18.9
Registered electors		8,735		▼69.0
PNP gain from JLP				

General Election 1962: Saint James North Western
Party	Candidate	Votes	%	±%
JLP	Herbert Eldemire	9,766	50.2	
PNP	Howard Cooke	9,332	47.9	
Independent	Allan G.S. Coombs	262	1.4	
Turnout		19,475	69.1	
Registered electors		28,170		
JLP gain from PNP				

== See also ==
- Politics of Jamaica
- Elections in Jamaica
