= Garth Taylor (ophthalmologist) =

The Honourable Dr. Garth Alfred Taylor, OJ, Ph.D. (29 April 1944 – 19 November 2005) was a Jamaican ophthalmologist, professor, and humanitarian.

Born in Montego Bay, Taylor was a Queen's Scout in his youth. He received his education at Cornwall College in Jamaica and Queen's University in Ontario. He later became an associate professor of ophthalmology at the latter institution, as well as chief of ophthalmology at Cornwall Community Hospital in Canada.

Taylor was also the vice-president of ORBIS Canada, a charity devoted to preventing and correcting avoidable cases of blindness in the developing world, and the co-founder of Canadian Surgical Eye Expeditions (CANSEE), another charitable organization devoted to the same purpose. Working out of a McDonnell Douglas DC-10 airplane converted into a mobile field hospital, he performed more than 1,000 charitable eye operations in more than 60 different countries, during more than 100 separate surgical missions. Taylor also provided on-site training for local doctors in cornea, cataract and refractive procedures. For his efforts, he was honored with the Order of Jamaica in 2005.

Taylor and his wife Beverly had two children: a daughter, Leanne, and a son, Gregory. He died unexpectedly on 19 November 2005, as the result of an aortic aneurysm.
