= Rachelle Smith (footballer) =

Jamaican footballer (born 1996)

Personal information
- Full name: Rachelle Rebecca Smith
- Date of birth: 18 September 1996 (age 30)
- Place of birth: Albuquerque, New Mexico, United States
- Height: 1.63 m (5 ft 4 in)
- Position: Defender

College career
Years	Team	Apps	(Gls)
2015–2018	Florida Gators	75	(0)

International career^{‡}
2019–	Jamaica	1	(0)
- ‡ National team caps and goals as of 3 August 2019

Rachelle Rebecca Smith (born 18 September 1996) is a professional footballer who plays as a defender. Born in the United States, she represents Jamaica internationally.

== Early life and education ==
Smith attended the University of Florida in Gainesville, Florida.

== International career ==
Smith made her senior debut for Jamaica on 3 August 2019 against Paraguay in the 2019 Pan American Games.

== Personal life ==
Smith is of Afro-Jamaican and Chinese-Jamaican descent.
