= Vincent HoSang =

Jamaican-American businessman and philanthropist

Vincent Getchum Hosang OD
- Born: August 5, 1940; St. James, Jamaica
- Citizenship: British subject (until 1962), Jamaica (by birth), United States^{[explain status]}
- Occupation: businessman
- Known for: founder of Caribbean Food Delights and Royal Caribbean Bakery
- Spouse: Jeanette HoSang (née Leefatt) (m. 1976)
- Children: 4
- Parent(s): Mr. and Mrs. Henry HoSang

Vincent Getchum HoSang, OD, (born August 5, 1940) is a Jamaican-American businessman and philanthropist, who is the CEO of Caribbean Food Delights and Royal Caribbean Bakery.

== Early life and education ==
HoSang was born in Springfield St. James, Jamaica to Mr. and Mrs. Henry HoSang who had migrated from China in the early 1900s. He is the eighth child of ten, six boys and four girls. At age 12, HoSang's parents moved to Montego Bay. He received his early education at Cornwall College. In February 1968, HoSang migrated to the Bronx, New York.

== Career ==
In February 1978, HoSang and his wife bought a fast food store known as Kingsbridge Delight in the West Bronx, selling fried chicken, shrimp, ribs, and French fries. In 1980, Sunrise Bakery on Dyre Avenue, which was owned by another West Indian, became available. The HoSangs bought it in December 1980 with the intention of making it a full-fledged Jamaican bakery and changed its name to Royal Caribbean Bakery. In 1984, they expanded into a 15,000 sq ft.facility on East 233rd street in the Bronx where Caribbean Food Delights was incorporated and became the frozen food division of Royal Caribbean Bakery. The company at this stage expanded into the wholesale trade. Three years later in 1987, both companies expanded into a 20,000 sq ft facility in Mount Vernon, New York. The HoSangs next bought a 73,000 sq. ft. building on 10 acres of property in Tappan, New York in 1993 and named it Caribbean Food Delights.

== Philanthropy ==
HoSang established the Vincent HoSang Family Foundation (VHFF) in April 2002 as a means of giving back to the community and educating future entrepreneurs. The VHFF is a 501(c)(3) organization that comprises the philanthropic arm of Caribbean Food Delights and Royal Caribbean Bakery. The foundation funds full scholarships for six students studying entrepreneurship at the University of the West Indies. The Vincent HoSang University of the West Indies Venture Competition (UWIVC) was started in 2002. Sponsorship was taken over by the foundation since its inception. Each year, the foundation is involved in a range of philanthropic projects, such as serving over 4,000 meals to student athletes at the Penn Relays in Pennsylvania every year, and donating US$250,000 to Missionaries of the Poor in Jamaica to build a place of worship, a food pantry, and other community activities.

== Personal life ==
HoSang met his wife, Jeanette (née Leefatt), who is from Spanish Town, Jamaica, in New York City and got married in August 1976. The couple have four children: Damian, Sabrina, Simone and Brian. Brian HoSang was involved in a fatal motorcycle crash on May 12, 2008, at the age of 24.

== Honors and awards ==
- Commonwealth Award, St. George's Society of New York (2010)
- Westchester County Board of Legislators Citation (2012)
- LL.D. (Hon.), University of the West Indies (2012)
- Lehman College Community Leadership Award (2013).
- Officer of the Order of Distinction, Jamaica (2015)
- Philadelphia City Council Citation (2018)
- Ernst & Young (EY) Entrepreneur Of The Year® Award in the Family Business category in New York (2019).
