= Allan Coombs =

Jamaican trade unionist (1901–1969)

Allan George St Claver Coombs (August 1901 – 15 July 1969) was a Jamaican trade unionist.

Coombs was born in the Parish of St. Ann, Jamaica in 1901. He described himself as "a peasant of low birth, very limited education and a very poor man". He served first in the Jamaica Constabulary Force, which he was rumoured to have left after defeating a white police officer in a fight. He then joined The West India Regiment where he rose to the rank of Lance Corporal before he left in 1927. However, it was as a contractor in the Public Works Department that this powerfully built and charismatic figure became involved in the early national movement and the organization of labor.

Coombs together with Hugh Clifford Buchanan, a mason by trade, founded the Jamaica Workers and Tradesmen's Union (JWTU) on May 17, 1936. Coombs described the very modest circumstances in which he and Buchanan started the JWTU. "On the 17th day of May, 1936, I contracted six labourers in the Kingston Race Course and they pledged themselves to be members of the society, which they asked me to find a suitable name for". He could hardly have known that within a year this organization would attract island wide support and lay the foundations for what would emerge from the labor rebellion of 1938.The first phase of organizational effort climaxed in October with the JWTU participating in a labor conference at Liberty Hall along with members of the UNIA, the ex-servicemen and the Masons' Co-operative Union. Finally, on December 30, Coombs and his union felt confident enough to challenge the colonial administration by staging a march of the unemployed. After disregarding the advice of the Deputy Mayor to turn back, the marchers were charged by the police. A description of this event was provided by Coombs in his memorandum to the Moyne Commission:"The people, all unarmed, were only carrying flags and banners bearing the words 'Starvation, Nakedness, Shelterless'. The Union Jack was torn in pieces? while the poor and unfortunate people received their floggings which necessitated many going to the hospital for treatment." Coombs responded by threatening a larger demonstration, and, more importantly, called on progressive persons island-wide to become representatives of his organization.

Coombs later joined the People's National Party. He was elected in North West St James, and was appointed as Minister of Communications and Works in Norman Manley's government, prior to the country's independence. He died in 1969.
