= Howard Cooke =

4th governor-general of Jamaica (1991-2006)

The Most Honourable Sir Howard Cooke ON CD GCMG GCVO KStJ
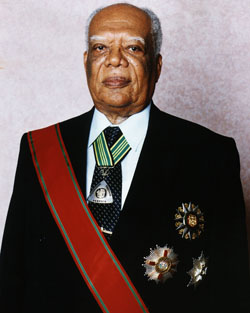

4th Governor-General of Jamaica
- In office 1 August 1991 – 15 February 2006
- Monarch: Elizabeth II
- Prime Minister: Michael Manley; P. J. Patterson
- Preceded by: Edward Zacca (acting)
- Succeeded by: Kenneth O. Hall

President of the Senate
- In office 1989–1993
- Preceded by: Ephraim Augustus Morgan
- Succeeded by: Winston V. Jones

Minister of Education
- In office 1974–1977
- Preceded by: Eli Matalon
- Succeeded by: Eric Bell

Minister of Labour and Public Service
- In office 1972–1980

Member of Parliament for Saint James North Western
- In office 1967–1976

Personal details
- Born: Howard Felix Hanlan Cooke; 13 November 1915 Goodwill, St. James, Jamaica
- Died: 11 July 2014 (aged 98) Kingston, Jamaica
- Spouse: Ivy Tai (m. 1939) until his death in 2014
- Children: Howard Jr. Richard; Audrey
- Education: Mico University College; University of London
- Occupation: Politician; educator

Sir Howard Felix Hanlan Cooke ON CD GCMG GCVO KStJ (13 November 1915 – 11 July 2014) served as the fourth Governor-General of Jamaica from 1 August 1991 to 15 February 2006.

== Early life ==
Cooke was born on 13 November 1915, in Goodwill, St. James, Jamaica, the son of David Brown Cooke and Mary Jane Minto. In his youth, Cooke was the group scoutmaster and secretary of the St. Andrew Boys' Scout Association and captain of the County of Cornwall cricket team. He attended Mico University College in Kingston and London University in London. Cooke was a teacher for 23 years, serving as President of the Jamaica Union of Teachers and Headmaster of Belle Castle All-Age School, Port Antonio Upper School, and Montego Bay Boys' School. He was also active in the insurance industry for some three decades, working at Standard Life Insurance Company, Jamaica Mutual Life Insurance Company, and ALICO.

== Career ==
One of the founding members of the People's National Party (PNP), Cooke joined politics in 1938. He became a member of the Parliament of the West Indies Federation in 1958, and then the independent Jamaican Parliament as a Senator and a Member of the House of Representatives after 1962. He was a minister in the government of Michael Manley during the 1970s and President of the Senate of Jamaica from 1989 to 1991. On 1 August 1991, he became the fourth Governor-General of Jamaica, succeeding Florizel Glasspole. Queen Elizabeth visited Jamaica in 1994 and 2002 while Cooke was Governor-General. He retired on 15 February 2006, and became the first Governor-General to invest his successor, Kenneth Octavius Hall. Afterwards, Cooke was appointed Chancellor of the International University of the Caribbean in Kingston.

== Personal life and death ==
Cooke had several views of British colonialism and slavery. In 2006, he remarked, "Even during slavery the British were sending some very good people out to Jamaica...Missionaries, Reformers...Jamaica's greatness was not entirely due to slavery." He was critical of Margaret Thatcher, her views stating that "after Thatcher we became more and more materialist... But there's more to life than cars and dollars."

On 22 July 1939, Cooke married schoolteacher Ivy Sylvia Lucille (née Tai). The couple had two sons, retired Court of Appeal Justice Howard Fitz-Arthur Cooke and hotelier Richard Washington McDermott Cooke, and one daughter, counsellor Audrey Faith.

Howard Cooke died at the age of 98 on 11 July 2014 in Kingston, Jamaica, only 11 days before he and Lady Cooke's 75th wedding anniversary. Lady Cooke died on 4 June 2017 aged 100.

== Awards and honours ==
In 1980, Cooke received the Special Plaque for Distinguished Service from the Commonwealth Parliamentary Association. In 1991, Cooke was awarded both the Order of the Nation and the Knight Grand Cross of the Most Distinguished Order of St Michael and St George (GCMG). In 1994, he was awarded the Knight Grand Cross of the Royal Victorian Order (GCVO). Several places in Jamaica are named after Howard Cooke, including the Howard Cooke Boulevard, Howard Cooke Primary School, and the Howard Cooke Campus at the International University of the Caribbean.

Preceded by Edward Zacca (acting)	Governor-General of Jamaica; 1991–2006	Succeeded by Kenneth Hall
