= Department of Correctional Services, Jamaica =

Government department of Jamaica

The Department of Correctional Services, Jamaica (DCS) is a department of the Ministry of National Security of Jamaica, headquartered in Kingston. The department operates prisons and jails in Jamaica. The current Commissioner of Corrections is Brigadier Radgh Mason.

== Operations ==
A male inmate who has served one year in prison and has no more than nine months left in his sentence may apply to stay in the Howard Hostel in Kingston; the inmate may work during the day, but he must stay in the hostel from 7 PM to 7 AM. Hostel services are not available for female inmates.

In Jamaica juvenile facilities house children from ages 12 to 17.

== Prisons ==
There is a total of eleven facilities on the island. Due to sentencing laws, the majority of inmates are held at the two maximum security facilities. These facilities are St. Catherine Adult Correctional Centre and Tower Street Adult Correctional Centre. While the lower security facilities are below capacity, these two facilities regularly hold high above their maximum capacity.

The high population in some of the facilities and lack of funding has led to substandard living conditions. Many of the inmates are held in cells that are infested with fleas, lice, and cockroaches. As many of these cells are only designed to hold one or two individuals, any additional inmates are forced to sleep on the floor. They are often only allowed out of their cells twice a day to visit the washroom. Despite an effort for reform, corruption in the prison system allows guards to abuse inmates, sometimes to the point of death.

In early 2017 the South Camp facility became the new women’s facility. The women were moved there from the aging Ft. Augusta facility. The women’s facility faces many of the same issues of overcrowding, poor living conditions, and abuse that the other facilities do.

Jamaica has made great effort to improve the juvenile side of their corrections system. Their four juvenile facilities are run like schools. The children are offered education and vocational training that will give them more job opportunities as adults. Unlike the adult facilities, the youth are allowed to occasionally leave the facility with special permission. Juvenile boys ages 12–17 are initially sent to St. Andrew Remand Centre. At the disposal of their court cases, they are sent to Hill Top Juvenile Correctional Centre or Rio Cobre Juvenile Correctional Centre, the two residential prisons for boys. All juvenile females ages 12–17 are sent to the Armadale Juvenile Correctional Centre.
