= Ministry of National Security (Jamaica) =

Government ministry of Jamaica

Agency overview
- Formed: 2001
- Headquarters: North Tower 2 Oxford Road Kingston 5. Jamaica
- Ministers responsible: Horace Chang, Minister of National Security; Matthew Samuda, Minister of State
- Website: https://www.mns.gov.jm/

The Ministry of National Security (MNS) is a statutory body under the government of Jamaica responsible for maintaining national safety through the enforcement of law and order. It has its headquarters in the North Tower of the NCB Towers in Kingston. It is also charged with preserving the security of Jamaica’s borders. Previously known as the Ministry of National Security and Justice it was then separated in 2001 to ensure that both ministries ran efficiently within their respective purviews. To accomplish its roles and responsibilities the ministry has multitude of divisions within its organization ranging from the Jamaican Constabulary Force (JCF) the official policing force of Jamaica to the Passport, Immigration and Citizenship Agency (PICA) which safeguards its borders. The salary of this cabinet position is JMD $8,031,788 annually.

== History ==
=== Formation ===
Previously the Ministry of National Security was paired with the Ministry of Justice however in 2001 the two ministries were separated to ensure each ministry focused on their respective responsibilities. It was mandated “to facilitate the maintenance of law and order protect Jamaica against internal and external threats, ensure the safety of Jamaica’s borders, and punish and rehabilitate offenders”.

=== Initiatives ===
Under the supervision of the Organisation for Economic Co-operation and Development (OECD) the Ministry of National Security managed the Community Security Initiative which seeks to instill a framework of action that targets the rejuvenation of security protocols and rebuild social inclusion. This initiative will provide services to at risk communities in an effort to dismantle the support of organised crime within those areas.

The Ministry of National Security implemented a new initiative in 2017 which focused on rehabilitating and supporting the reassimilation young offenders called the We Transform youth empowerment programme. It was targeted at children between the ages of 12 and 17 years who had been exposed to the Department of Correctional Services (DCS), employing educational training and personality building skills in order to transform them into productive citizens. Amidst the goals was to contribute a decrease in youth offending and recidivism and in turn build self-esteem, imbue a sense of purpose and advocate good virtues. The programme was provided in conjunction with a variety of partners including the HEART/Trust NTA, the HOPE Programme, the Multi-Care Youth Foundation and private sector organisations.

Project Rebuild Overhaul and Construct (ROC) which is an initiative introduced by the Ministry of National Security in 2019 poses a strategy to convert current police stations into contemporary, citizen friendly workspaces which foster efficiency and effectiveness. It works to fulfil the ministries objective of modernizing the Jamaica Constabulary Force through the comprehensive implementation of information and communications technology. During early 2020 the ministry provided the JCF with a number of private cameras mandated under the Jamaica Eye surveillance programme and 107 motor vehicles which were retrofitted to suit the police force.

== Policies ==
As of 2020 the ministry has prioritized the reduction of crime as a national imperative. In conjunction with this it has listed ten major policy elements to be undertaken. Citizen Safety and Security is the primary objective with the reduction of the threat of crime and violence throughout Jamaica being the integral goal.

Public Order is another element which will dictate how the ministry controls the way people operate and conduct business within the public domain and in order to achieve this the ministry seeks to introduce new laws, regulations, establish entertainment zones and enhance stability in public transport.

Corruption is also a major element within the ministry’s plan to revamp the Jamaican community through demolishing engrained structures and procedures for selfish benefit and gain that would not otherwise accrue.

Community Safety is planned to be reinvigorated by introducing positive leadership and comprehensive planning at the local level in place of the illegitimate systems of governance currently thriving.

Territorial Integrity is also a vital element within the ministry’s policy prioritization as it looks to assure the preservation and command of Jamaica’s marine, air and land space for the benefit of all citizens.

Crisis Response and Resilience which will endeavor to develop and reaffirm Jamaica’s ability to survive disasters of any nature through the establishment of government protocol and a national risk management strategy.

Education although not pertinent under the ministry’s purviews, it is an essential policy element as a lack of essential education is one of the root causes of lawlessness and violence. This is due to its role in cultivating poor conflict resolution management, and unskilled, unemployed individuals, which lead to the proliferation of gangs and criminality.

Cyber security encompasses the safeguarding of confidential business and state information as it is a fundamental aspect of maintaining a prosperous Jamaica.

Critical Infrastructure Protection, which involves ensuring crucial infrastructure is safe and secure including the country’s water and electricity supplies, hospitals and government installations.

Economic Security is the final element under the Ministry of National Security present policy objectives. It entails preserving the integrity of Jamaica’s financial system through the suppression of participation from criminal elements within the country.

== Divisions ==
=== Jamaica Constabulary Force (JCF) ===
Jamaica’s official police force whose mission under the Ministry of National Security is ‘to serve protect and reassure with courtesy, integrity and respect for the rights of all’. It roles include assisting in the detection and prevention of crime, investigating alleged crimes, protecting life and property, and enforcing all criminal law defined by the Jamaican penal code .

=== Department of Correctional Services, Jamaica (DCS) ===
A department under the Ministry of National Security which oversees the correctional centres and performs vital functions such as overseeing the probation, parole and hostel services and ensuring the provision of rehabilitation programmes for inmates

=== Caribbean, Regional Drug Law Enforcement Training Centre (REDTRAC) ===
Introduced in September 1996, REDTRAC operates as a division of the Ministry of National Security which seeks to inform Caribbean countries on national drug control. Within Jamaica it has residential facility that continues to strengthen national and regional capacities to address drug law enforcement.

=== Firearm Licensing Authority (FLA) ===
Established in 2005 as a statutory organisation under the Ministry of National Security by an act of parliament. It is responsible for standardizing and implementing the process for granting and renewing firearm licenses whilst simultaneously acting as a centralized administrative body and database repository.

=== Private Security Regulation Authority (PSRA) ===
A statutory body under the Ministry of National Security. Enacted under the PSRA Act 1992 which commissioned the organisation to monitor and regulate private security firms. It is responsible for issuing licenses and registration cards and taking lawful measures to aid in upholding its duties.

=== Passport, Immigration and Citizenship Agency (PICA) ===
An executive agency under the ministry which is responsible for the safety of the Jamaican borders. It is tasked with major functions including attending to immigration requests, processing citizen applications and investigating in the area regulated by PICA. Migration management presents a far greater security challenge to weak and failing states than to advanced post-industrial states therefore PICA serves a vital role in assuring Jamaica’s national security.

== Ministers ==
- Derrick Smith (2007-2009)
- Dwight Nelson (2009 to 2011)
- Peter Bunting (2012 to 2016)
- Robert Montague (2016 to 2018)
- Horace Chang (since March 2018)

== See also ==
- Cabinet of Jamaica
- Prime Minister of Jamaica
- Ministry of National Security (The Bahamas)
- Ministry of National Security (Grenada)
- Ministry of National Security (Trinidad and Tobago)
