= List of recipients of the Order of Jamaica =

This list includes the names of people who have received the Order of Jamaica, sorted alphabetically by last name, along with the year in which they were honoured. Members of the Order of Jamaica are entitled to be styled "The Honourable" and have the post-nominal letters 'O.J.' and 'O.J. (Hon.)', as appropriate.

Recipient	Year
Giuseppe (Pino) Maffessanti	2018
Howard Aris	2012
Professor Barbara Evelyn Bailey	2008
Amy Bailey	1990
Enid Bennett	2012
Christopher Blackwell	2004
Bishop Herro Blair	2007
Usain Bolt	2009
Steve Bucknor	2007
Archbishop Lawrence Burke	2009
Dr. Gladstone Chang	2011
Bill Clarke	2007
Sue M. Cobb	2010
Headley Cunningham	2007
Queen Sofía of Spain	2009
Dr. Rae Davis	2006
Godfrey Glengoffe Dyer	2018
May Farquharson	1990
Michael Fennell	2005
Professor Peter Figueroa	2008
Arnold Foote	2010
Terrence Forrester	2012
Vincent Stephen Francis	2017
Dr. Julius Winston Garvey	2019
Dr. Mavis Gilmour-Petersen	2009
Dr. Carolyn Gomes	2009
Reverend Weeville Gordon	2007
Phillip Frederick Gore	2017
Ray Elias Hadeed	2006
Professor Kenneth O. Hall	2004
Tony Hart	2017
Zaila McCalla	2007
Marshall Hall	2010
Hugh Hart	2011
Toots Hibbert	2012
Richard Ho Lung	2008
Patrick Andrew Alwyn Junior Hylton	2020
Earl Wesley Adolph Jarrett	2018
Professor Edwin Jones	2007
Grace Beverly Jones	2018
Byron Lee	2008
Michael Lee-Chin	2008
Robert Earle Levy	2019
Beverley Lopez	2006
Henry Lowe	2012
Ferdinand Mahfood	2012
Alferita Constantia "Rita" Marley	2019
Neville McCook	2006
Archibald McDonald	2017
Claude McKay	1977 (posthumous)
Queen's Counsel Shirley Miller	2004
Professor Owen St. Clair Morgan	2006
Peter Moses	2011
Keble Munn	2007
Merlene Joyce Ottey	2020
Frank Phipps	2011
Robert Dixon Pickersgill	2019
Dorothy Pine-McLarty	2007
Monsignor Gregory Ramkissoon	2010
Donald Reece	2012
Reverend Alfred Reid	2005
Molly Rhone	2011
Patrick Robinson	2009
Derrick Rochester	2012
Karl George Samuda	2020
Douglas Anthony Clive Saunders	2011
Professor Gordon Shirley	2009
Reverend Carmen Stewart	2007
Clifton George Whyms Stone	2017
Adrian Strachan	2007
Thomas George Tavares-Finson	2020
Garth Taylor	2005
Muriel Lowe Valentine	2009
Bunny Wailer	2012
Danville Walker	2008
Basil Watson	2005
Brian Hector John Wynter	2020
Professor Sylvia Wynter	2010
Kenneth Smith	1973
Dr. Kenneth Osbourne Rattray	1983
Pearnel Patroe Charles	2021
Dr. Peter David Phillips	2021
Ian Kent Levy	2021
Ernest Adheir "Ernie" Ranglin	2021
Montgomery Bernard "Monty" Alexander	2022
Joan Isabelle Duncan	2022 (posthumous)
Shelly-Ann Fraser-Pryce	2022
Olivia "Babsy" Grange	2022
Justice (Ret'd) Karl Stanhope Harrison	2022
Rita Humphries-Lewin	2022
Professor Maureen A. Samms-Vaughan	2022
Audrey Vivia Sewell	2022
Professor Alvin George Wint	2022
Sheryl Lee Ralph	2022 (honorary)
Howard Gregory	2023
