= Jamaica College =

Location
- 189 Old Hope Road; Kingston, 6 Jamaica; 18.0187369°N 76.7584694°W

Information
- Other names: J.C.; JC; True Blue; The Dark Blues; 1College
- Type: Public secondary school
- Motto: Latin: Floreat Collegium, Fervet Opus in Campis (May the College Flourish, Work is Burning in the Field)
- Religious affiliation: Christian
- Established: 1789; 237 years ago
- Founder: Charles Drax
- School code: 02058
- Principal: Wayne Robinson
- Staff: 97 (2008)
- Years offered: 7–13
- Gender: Boys
- Age range: 10–18
- Enrolment: 1,799 (2008)
- Campus type: Urban
- Houses: 8
- Colours: Navy Blue and White
- Mascot: Griffin
- Rival: Kingston College, Calabar High School, St. George’s College.
- Accreditation: CSEC, CAPE
- Website: www.jamaicacollege.org

Jamaica College (abbreviated J.C. or JC) is a public, Christian, secondary school and sixth form for boys in Kingston, Jamaica. It was established in 1789 by Charles Drax, who was the grand-nephew of wealthy Barbadian sugar planter James Drax.

It provides traditional classroom education to its students in a variety of subject areas and caters to students aged 10 to 18 years. First established as a boarding school for boys, it has remained a single-sex school with the boarding facilities removed, but later re-opened in 2016.

During the 18th century when Jamaica prospered as a sugar colony of the British Empire, several large donations were made by wealthy slave owners for the funding of schools. The objective of these bequests was usually to provide free education for the poor of the parish to which the benefactor belonged. Jamaica College is a product of such a bequest. The school is widely known for both its academic and sports achievements, and has produced many influential members of Jamaican society.

== History ==
=== Drax Free School ===
Jamaica College was founded in 1789, making it the sixth oldest continually running high school in the Jamaica, after Wolmer's Boys', one of the Wolmer's Schools (1729), Manning's School (1738), St Jago High School (1744), Rusea's High School (1777) and Titchfield High School (1786). It was first known as the Drax Free School in the parish of Saint Ann, and was founded by Charles Drax, a planter of that parish, who was originally from Twickenham, England. Drax came to Jamaica from Barbados, and as a white slave-owning planter, he was elected the representative of Saint Ann in 1702, the now-defunct parish of Saint David in 1707, Saint Mary in 1708, the now-defunct parish of Saint George in 1710, and the parish of Saint James in 1719. He died in 1721, and his estate was valued at nearly £9,000, including 307 slaves, of which 167 were male and 140 female.

Drax left money in his will to establish a charity school in Saint Ann. The school was intended for the education of eight boys and four girls, most of whom were white and poor. The will stipulated that two female black slaves on the Drax Hall estate would be used to keep the school "clean and neat". The will stipulated that the children were to be taught "reading, writing and arithmetick".

There was some delay and legal proceedings before the money was handed over to the Saint Ann vestry. With no one to probate the Drax will, and with the theft of some of the money, Jamaica College in its original form did not start until 1795. Then it was decided that Jamaica College would be a high school and an outpost of the University of London. It was in 1802 that the sum of £5,200 ($10,400 at the time), was applied by an Act of the Legislature to the endowment of the school.

=== Jamaica Free School ===
The Jamaica Free School was established at Walton, near Moneague, in the parish of Saint Ann. The property at Walton Pen was bought for the site of the school, purchased in 1806. A year later, another Act of Legislature gave the school the name, Jamaica Free School. Both the names Drax Free School and Jamaica Free School had nothing to do with the concept of free tuition for attendees, but meant that the school was for the children of free people, both white and free black and mixed race. The Free School was not intended for black slaves, though his will did make an exception for his "slave Robinson", who was to be admitted and "placed out as one of them". The Free School was typical of a number of institutions set up during that era.

=== Jamaica High School ===
The school had its name changed 73 years later. In 1879, during the governorship of Sir Anthony Musgrave, a provision was made by law for the Jamaica Free School to come under the jurisdiction of the Jamaica School Commission. The institution was now to be known under a new name, Jamaica High School. All classes at the time were free so there was no longer a need to call the school Jamaica Free School, but the purpose of the school remained the same until 1903. This law also authorized the removal of the school from Walton Pen in St. Ann in 1883, and classes were conducted at Barbican Great House until mid-1885. The school then had a new headmaster, Reverend (later Archdeacon) William Simms.

The buildings on Old Hope Road were opened on 9 July 1885, by the then Governor of Jamaica, Sir Henry Wylie Norman, and the first classes took place in September of the same year. In September 1890, a college was opened in connection with the school, known as University College. The site at Old Hope Road was also the tropical outpost of the University of London. It was therefore decided that the purpose of the school would be to give secondary preparation to potential students of the University of London who happened to reside in Jamaica. The name revision reflected this change, which became the school's second purpose. Until 1902 there were two separate names for the school's units. Subsequently, Jamaica High School and University College were amalgamated under the name Jamaica College. Therefore, during its history, the school has changed both name and location four times.

=== Jamaica College ===
Given that the sole purpose of Jamaica College from 1903 onwards was to train potential university students in the days when the University of the West Indies did not exist, in practice most students did not go further than fourth or fifth forms. That was considered sufficient education for just about any managerial or clerical job in Jamaica. It was also considered uneconomical to run a school of less than eighty boys, and therefore a deliberate attempt to expand the school to include those of parents who were able to afford the fees was embarked upon. By the 1930s, the student population rose to over one hundred and fifty.

In 1957, the elected government of the day introduced a system of Common Entrance to all High Schools in Jamaica. After some amount of initial resistance by the school board, Jamaica College, previously accessible only to the elite and a few academically extraordinary boys who won government scholarships, was opened up to the masses of Jamaica. The school now provided one of several outlets for secondary education in Jamaica.

Jamaica College developed as a boarding institution until 1967, when that system was removed. Up to that period, the school population was primarily composed of boys from affluent families and heritage. Today, as a day school, it comprises students from a wide cross-section of the community. Its Old Boys continue to play important roles in the religious, political, business and professional services, of Jamaica.

Notably, in 2011, Jamaica College was awarded to be the most innovative high school in Jamaica which is a reflection of the many achievements and special development programmes that have been implemented at the institution in recent times. The award was received through the Unearthing Innovations Project education competition.

==== Jamaica College Museum ====
To continue preserving the rich history of Jamaica College, a museum has been established on the grounds of the institution. The museum boasts scores of poster boards, which chronicle the history of the school, and secondary education in the country in a systematic and comprehensive manner. The museum also boasts several video screens, which will allow users to find the articles they need speedily. Photographs of original buildings of the institution, as well as schoolboys enjoying or participating in various sporting disciplines are also on display in the facility.

== Campus ==
The Jamaica College campus is currently owned by the Jamaica College Trust which is chaired by Derek Jones.

The campus of Jamaica College was selected as the site for a new outdoor electrical lighting pilot project being led by the Petroleum Corporation of Jamaica in the organisation's efforts to promote renewable energy sources.

=== Historic buildings ===
Since 19 June 2000, four buildings on the campus have been declared National Heritage Sites by the Jamaica National Heritage Trust.

==== Simms building ====
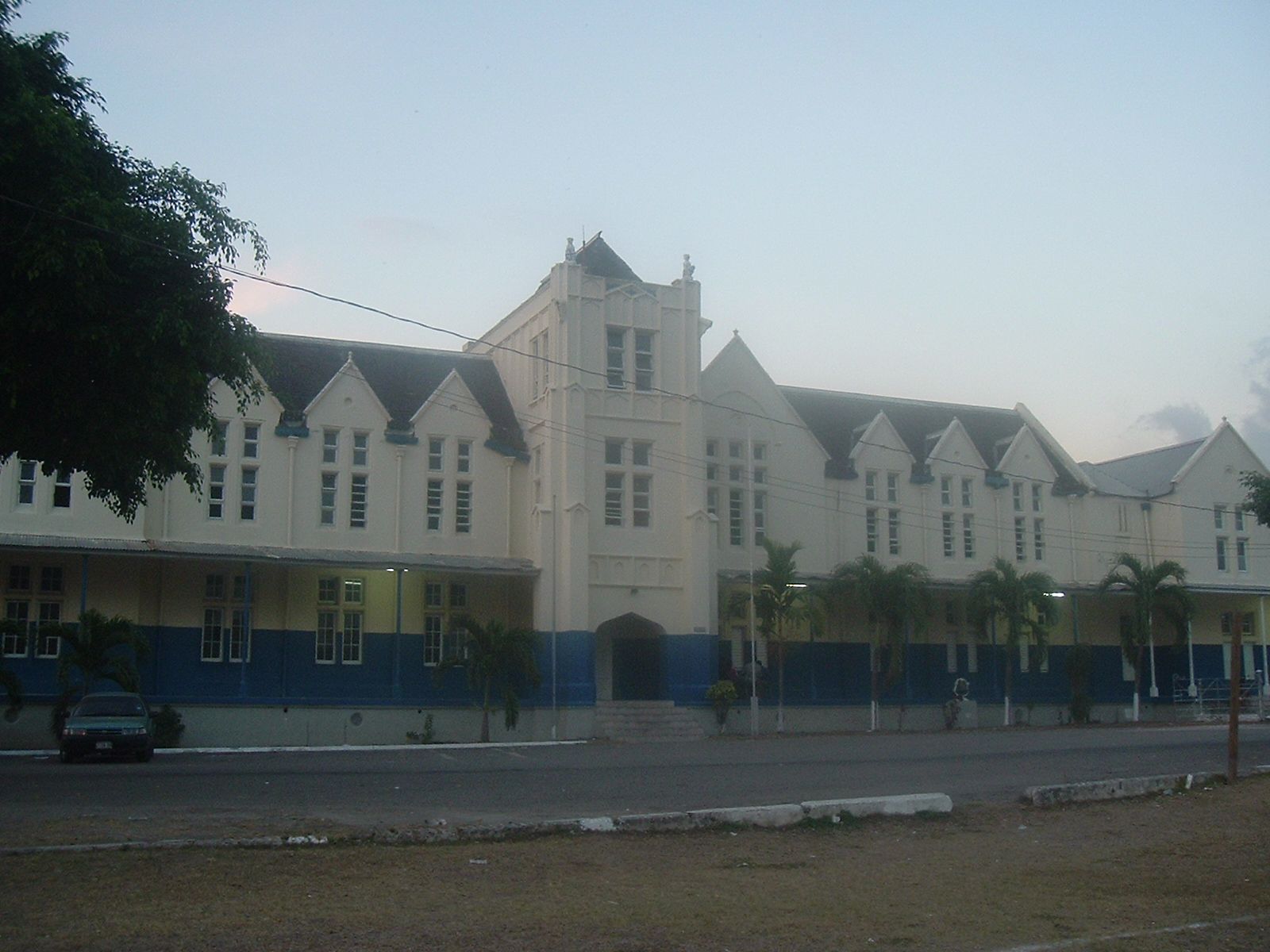
The Simms building

Built in 1885 of masonry and timber, the Simms building exhibits a combination of Gothic and Georgian features; the projecting central tower and wings are reminiscent of Georgian designs, while the façade's soaring verticals, griffins, and pointed arch openings, are Gothic. The building at Hope was designed at the time to accommodate boarders as well as day students, and was large enough to hold the whole school without difficulty. It now houses the administrative offices, staff room and sixth form classrooms. For over a hundred years, Simms Hall has been the core of the Jamaica College buildings, its strength and durability repeatedly demonstrated by its resistance to hurricanes and earthquakes, including the disastrous Kingston earthquake of 1907.

==== Scotland building ====
Erected in 1889 of brick, mortar, and wood, with iron detailing on the balcony railings, the Scotland building combines a variety of architectural styles including palladian windows on the west elevation, a lower arcaded wrap around verandah, and a steep-pitched cedar shingled hip roof. It was first used as a dormitory, and it now houses classrooms.

==== Assembly Hall ====
Constructed in 1913 of concrete block and steel, the Assembly Hall is wrapped by an arcaded verandah which helps to keep the interior cool. Its hipped roof of cedar shingles is partially concealed by parapet walls. It was originally used as an assembly hall, and it now houses classrooms.

==== The Chapel ====
The chapel was built in 1924. Its walls are constructed of reinforced concrete and concrete breather block. Along the north and south elevations a stepped roof creates a clerestory level for ventilation and diffused lighting. The east and west windows of the building are of stained glass. The west window is said to be a replica of St Dunstan's window at Canterbury Cathedral in England. There is a war memorial which commemorates the memory of the 17 Jamaica College Old Boys who sacrificed their lives during the First World War.

=== Karl Hendrickson Auditorium ===
Since 2006, the Jamaica College Trust has embarked on a 5-year school improvement and renovation programme. One of the projects included the construction of a multi-purpose auditorium. Named after Hon. Dr. Karl Hendrickson, a Jamaica College alumnus who contributed heavily to the construction project, the new Christian auditorium is poised to host the school's formal events, including graduations, prize giving ceremonies, morning devotions, general assembly and theater and music productions. Jamaica College will now be able to comfortably host various indoor sporting events such as basketball, volleyball, badminton and table tennis in the 11,000 sqft structure. The auditorium was opened on 22 November 2010.

=== The Phillip Gore Building ===
During the summer of 2011, four classrooms were refurbished and a fifth constructed on the Jamaica College campus. Because of the contributions of Phillip Gore to the construction of the classrooms, the building has been officially named "The Phillip Gore Building". The building was dedicated to the school on 30 September 2011.

=== The Frank Hall Gym ===
A naturally lit and spacious gymnasium for the athletes of the Jamaica College was renovated and dedicated in 2013 in and named in honor of Olympian Frank Hall, who graduated in 1953. The gym was fully stocked with a plethora of world class equipment all donated by the Jamaica College Old Boys of New York. While the Frank Hall Gym will primarily support the students who compete and represent Jamaica College in various sporting disciplines, the gym is open to the entire school population and serve as a platform to reinforce the importance of staying active and to establish a fitness routine.

=== Ashenheim Stadium ===
Jamaica College became the first high school in Jamaica to have its own stadium complex. The facility was commissioned in February 2019.

== Academics ==
As a secondary school in Jamaica, Jamaica College follows the traditional English grammar school model used throughout the British West Indies, which incorporates the optional year 12 and 13, collectively known as sixth form. The first year of secondary school is regarded as first form, or year seven, and the subsequent year groups are numbered in increasing order up to sixth form. Students prepare for courses prescribed and administered by the Caribbean Examinations Council. Students in the upper sixth form (year thirteen) are prepared for their GCE A-level examinations, however the option exists to sit exams after completing lower sixth form (year 12). The following table outlines the academic curriculum that exists at Jamaica College.

Subjects offered at Jamaica College

Core Courses (available from 1st–3rd form)
English A (English Language), Mathematics, Physical Education
Automotive Arts, Biology, Business Basics, Chemistry, English B (English Literature), Food and Nutrition, General Science, Geography, History, Guidance, Integrated Science, Library Skills, Music, Physics, Religious Education, Resource and Technology, Social Studies, Spanish, Technical Drawing, Visual Arts

CSEC Courses (available from 4th–5th form)
English A (English Language), Mathematics
Biology, Chemistry, Physics, Human & Social Biology, Applied Mathematics, EDPM, Economics, English B (English Literature), Geography, History, Information Technology, Office Administration, Principles of Accounts, Principles of Business, Spanish, Social Studies, Electrical/Electronics Technology, Visual Arts

CAPE Courses (available in lower and upper 6th form)
Caribbean Studies, Communication Studies
Accounting, Biology, Chemistry, Computer Science, Economics, French, GMED, Physics, Pure Mathematics, Law, Management of Business

Optional Courses (available from 5th–6th form)
Aviation Education, Robotics

=== Rhodes Scholars ===
Since 1904, Jamaica College has had a rich history of producing Rhodes Scholars who have gone on to lead in various capacities both locally and internationally. To date, there have been 15 Rhodes Scholar recipients that attended Jamaica College.

Rhodes Scholarship recipients

Name	University	Oxford College	Year	Notability
Reginald Myrie Murray	n/a	Worcester	1904	Educ. Jamaica H.S. Hon. Mods. (Maths) 2nd Cl. Maths. (F.H.S.) B.A. 3rd Cl. Teaching, Jamaica College 1907–17. Headmaster, Jamaica College 1933–42. M.B.E. (Mil.)
Hugh Eames Worley	n/a	Exeter	1906	Educ. Jamaica College. Hist. B.A. 2nd Cl. Teaching, England.
Norman Washington Manley	n/a	Jesus	1914	Educ. Jamaica College. B.C.L. 2nd B.A. (War) Called to the Bar (Cert. of Honour) England 1921. Practice of Law Jamaica 1922–. Chief Minister of Jamaica 1955–59. Premier 1959–62. Hon. Fellow of Jesus College 1958.
Charles McLarth Morales	n/a	Oriel	1917	Educ. Jamaica College. Hist. B.A. 3rd Cl. Dip. Ed. Grn. R.G.A. Insp. Of School 1922–24. Examiner 1934. Asst. Dir. Of Education 1944–50. Acting Dep. Dir. 1948–50.
Walter Norman Dickenson	n/a	Pembroke	1921	Educ. Jamaica College. Physiol. B.A. 3rd Cl. B.M., B. Ch., M.A. Hospital appointments in London 1927–9. Med. Practice, Jamaica 1929–.
Noel Newton Nethersole	n/a	Lincoln	1923	Educ. Jamaica College. Read Law. Practice Law, Jamaica 1926–. Vice Pres. People's National Party. Mem. House of Representatives 1949. Minister of Finance, 1955
Francis Ralph Halliday	n/a	Lincoln	1926	Educ. Munro College. Mod. Langs. (French) B.A. 3rd Cl. Teaching, England, Chile. Mod. Lang. Master, Jamaica College 1941–44. Dir., Colombo-Brit. Inst., Cali, Colombia 1945–60
Henry Lawrence Lindo	n/a	Keble	1931	Educ. Jamaica College. English Lang. And Lit. 3rd Cl. Insp. Of Schools 1935–43. Asst. Information Officer. Jamaica 1939-433 Secretariat, Jamaica 1943–52. Administrator, Dominica, 1952–59. Acting Governor, Windward Islands 1957 and 1959. Governor's Sec., Jamaica 1960–62.High Commissioner for Jamaica in London 1962–74. Amb. To Paris 1966–74. Amb. To Federal Republic of Germany 1967–70.
Henry Richmond Harold Fowler	n/a	Worcester	1935	Educ. Jamaica College. Pass Degree 1938, B.A., M.A. Ed., Public Opinion 1939–42. Founder and Headmaster, The Priory School 1944. Chairman, little Theatre Movement, Education Assistance Grants Committee, T.V. Committee of JBC, Vice Chairman, Education Advisory Committee
Eric Vivian Ellington	n/a	Hertford	1946	Educ. Jamaica College. Chem. (Pt. 1) 1949' Authentics.Sen. Sci. Master and Housemaster, Jamaica College 1949–53. Research Fellow in Chem., Univ. Coll. Of W.I. 1953. Carnegie Research Fellowship, Trinity Hall, Camb. 1947–48. PhD (Lond.) 1958. Lect., Univ. Coll. Of W.I.: Dept. of Biochem. 1960; Sen. Lect. Dept. Biochem. 1975–; Vice-Dean, Faculty of Medicine 1978–; Sec. Jamaican and British Caribbean Rhodes Scholp. 1972.
Author Ralph Carnagie	University College of the West Indies	Jesus	1960	Educ. Jamaica College; Univ. Coll. Of the W. Indied 1956–59; Univ. London (Univ.Coll.) B.A. 1960. Jurispr. 1st Cl. M.A. Fellow and tutor in law, Jesus 1964–70. Barrister-at-law (Gray's Inn) 1965. Prf. Of Law, UWI 1970–. Visiting Scholar, Yale Law School 1980–81
Eric Anthony Hudson Abrahams	University College of the West Indies	St. Peter's	1962	Educ. Jamaica College; Univ. Coll. Of the W. Indies, B.A. 1961. Read Law. Press. Of the Oxford Union 1964–65. Dir., Jamaica Tourist Board.
Richard Douglas Fletcher	University College of the West Indies	Exeter	1965	Educ. Jamaica College; Univ. Coll. Of the W. Indies, BSc 1963. (Scholp. Back dates to 1964). Jurispr. 2nd Cl. Read for B. Phil.; Nuffield 1965–68, B.A., B.Phil. Int. Bank for Reconstruction and Development 1965–72. Special Asst. to PM of Jamaica 1972–73. Chmn., Sugar Industry Authority of Jamaica 1973–76. Minister of State fr Planning 1977–80. Dep. Mgr., Econ. Integration, Int. Development Bank 1980–.
Cecil Dennis Harrington Morrison	University of the West Indies	Balliol	1975	Educ. Jamaica College; Wolmers; Univ. of the W. Indies; Norman Manley Law School, B.A., L.L.B. admitted to practice 1975. Practice of Law 1977–. Tutor, Norman Manley Law School 1978–1982. Associate Tutor, 1982–.
Collin McKenzie	University of the West Indies	Green	1991	Educ., Jamaica College; University of the West Indies, M.B., BS. (with Honours) D.Phil. (Clinical Medicine).

=== Flight School ===
Jamaica College is the first English-speaking high school in the Caribbean to offer an aviation programme to its students. The course is being offered in partnership with a Jamaican company, The Flying Club and managed by executive director, David Robertson, Class of '78. Since 2009, it operates under the Aircraft Training Organisation's (ATO) approval granted to The Flying Club by the Jamaica Civil Aviation Authority (JCAA) for a private pilot's licence ground school.

=== Robotics ===
On 1 December 2009, Jamaica College announced the establishment of a robotics programme and its entry in the FIRST Competition, the premier Robotics Competition in the United States for high school students. The Jamaica College Old Boys Association of New York, Inc., conceptualized the entire project and spearheaded the creation of the fully outfitted Robotics Lab at the school to promote practical applications of robotics adopted into the school's science education.

The JCOBA-NY also procured and shipped the FIRST robotics kit to JC, registered the "Griffins" as a New York-based team in the FIRST Tech Challenge and arranged the team logistics to and from the tournament.

The precursor to the Robotics project was embedded in foundation work that was done and the foresight of the Jamaica College Old Boys Association of New York to build and equip the first computer lab at JC (circa 1990) which was enthusiastically embraced and endorsed by Principal Ruel Taylor. With an initial shipment of 80 computers, the first in the nation high school computer lab was up and running.

The first entry for a Caribbean high school and a school outside the United States in the robotics field began before the 21st century.

=== Seamanship ===
The school continues to broaden the exposure to the students by entering into a memorandum of understanding with the Caribbean Maritime Institute of Jamaica to offer courses and career opportunities in the nautical industry.

=== STEAM Infusion Project ===
On 27 January 2021 the school launched its a STEAM program, that has its basis in the STEM learning initiative as well as adding Art as a component of the curriculum.

== Extracurricular ==
Extracurricular activities exist for all students and generally voluntary activities.

=== Activities ===
==== Cadet ====
The Jamaica College Cadet Unit (JCCU) is a member of the first battalion of the Jamaica Combined Cadet Force (JCCF). The unit has over 90 members. It is the headquarters company and one of the first cadet unit established in Jamaica under the Army and Air Cadet Force which was established on 1 November 1943.

==== Chapel Choir ====
The Jamaica College Chapel Choir.

==== Schools Challenge Quiz ====
Jamaica College actively participates as one of 64 high schools in TVJ's Schools Challenge Quiz. The school's lone victory came in 1987.

==== Chess ====
Jamaica College won the inter-schools team chess tournament four years straight between 1982 and 1985.

== Sports ==
Among the outdoor games, football and athletics are the most popular. The organisation of the sporting disciplines is facilitated via the House system. The students are assigned to one of eight houses upon entering Jamaica College. The houses are named after famous past principals of the school.

- Chambers
- Cowper
- DaCosta
- Drax
- Hardie
- Murray
- Musgrave
- Simms

Every year near to or at the end of the school year, there is a sporting competition among the Houses on a day called Sports Day. Football, track and field and basketball and also tennis are a few sports in which student compete to earn points for their houses. The winning house will be crowned champion until next years sports day, the team will also win medals.

=== Athletics ===
Annually, various high schools, athletic clubs and organisations compete in the Wata/Powerade/Jamaica College Track & Field Development Meet. As of January 2013, there has been 20 stagings of the Jamaica College Invitational. The meet, which serves as a qualifying event for the Boys' and Girls' Athletics Championships, is the first official meet on the JAAA local events calendar. The meet is sponsored by Wata and Powerade and is organised and hosted on the Jamaica College campus.

As of April 2011, the school has won the boys' title an overall 21 times at the Grace Kennedy and Company Limited-sponsored Inter-Secondary Schools Sports Association (ISSA) Boys' and Girls' Athletics Championships during the event's 101-year history. The athletics team has maintained a promising showing over the recent years, consistently placing in the top five among all the participants. The most recent victory has been achieved in the 2011 edition, making the school the current champions and holders of the Mortimer Geddes Trophy. On 2 April 2011, Jamaica College marked the 100th anniversary of their first ever title in 1911 with their first hold on the title since 2000. It was also the first year that the Decathlon and Javelin were contested at the championships, with both events being won by Jamaica College athletes.

The school takes part in the annual Penn Relays Carnival hosted annually since 21 April 1895 by the University of Pennsylvania. Jamaica College has continued to grow from strength to strength in the relay events as well as the field events on offer. As of April 2014, Jamaica College has earned five championship records since participation.

The Hugo Chambers 10K Road Race is a tribute to the late former Jamaica College headmaster and sports administrator, Hugo Chambers. The event takes place in the Liguanea/Papine area. The event is usually organised for October or November annually and includes 1.7 km (1.1 mi), 3.2 km (2.0 mi) and 10 km (6.2 mi) events.

=== Basketball ===
Jamaica College has been dubbed the school of basketball in Jamaica. Many of its titles were won in the late 1990s and early 2000s. Jamaica College participates in the KFC-sponsored ISSA Schoolboy Basketball Competition as a member of the Southern Conference.

=== Cricket ===
The urban area secondary schools compete annually in the Grace Shield Schoolboy Cricket Competition, a Grace-sponsored schoolboy cricket competition.

=== Football ===
Statistics
Under-19
- Manning Cup: 31/100 Titles
- Walker Cup: 3/50 Titles
- Olivier Shield: 22/100 Titles
- FLOW Super Cup: 1/7 Titles

The ISSA Manning Cup Schoolboy Football Competition, was first played in Jamaica in 1909. Jamaica College won the Manning Cup for eight of the first nine years, losing only once in 1920. As of November 2015, Jamaica College has won 27 Manning Cup titles, making them the school with the most wins.

The ISSA/Pepsi/Digicel Schoolboy Walker Cup Knock-out Competition is a knock-out tournament of the top eight teams emerging from the first round of the Manning Cup competition. The number of teams and the knock-out nature of the competition allow for only three rounds of play; the quarter-final round, semi-final round then the final. The Walker Cup is held after the first round and before the inter-zone round of the Manning Cup. In 2009, after a century of schoolboy football history in Jamaica, Jamaica College attained their first hold on the Walker Cup.

The Sydney Olivier Interscholastic Challenge Shield is the oldest and most prestigious schoolboy football title in Jamaica. The Olivier Shied, as it is more commonly known, is a two-game playoff which symbolises schoolboy football supremacy as the Manning Cup Champions (who emerge from Jamaica's corporate area schools) are pitted against their rural area counterparts, the DaCosta Cup Champions. Jamaica College have made good on their Olivier Shield acquisitions, having been able to obtain the trophy 75% of the time that they are Manning Cup Champions. As of November 2013, Jamaica College has won the Olivier Shield 18 times. This record, when coupled with Jamaica College's win percentage in the Manning Cup, makes them the most successful high school in Jamaica.

In December 2010, Jamaica College completed a historic triple by winning all the Under-19 schoolboy football competitions on offer during a single season. Consequently, Jamaica College was also successful in defending the Walker Cup in the 2010 season of football which meant that this was the first time in the school's history that Jamaica College were the title-holders of both urban area schoolboy football titles – the Manning and Walker Cups. With this milestone accomplishment, Jamaica College has won every schoolboy football title on offer except the Under-16 Colts title since 2005.

In 2014, telecommunications company LIME introduced to Jamaica the LIME Super Cup. The event was marketed as the Champions League of Jamaican Schoolboy Football. In its inaugural year, Jamaica College won the tournament at the final played at Sabina Park in Kingston. The under-19 football team was rewarded an accumulated JA$1M in prize money for their efforts and achievements. The funds are geared towards a school development programme. There are several special football competitions that are played between traditional rival schools which are most often used as practice for the football season. Since 2004, the football teams of Jamaica College and Calabar High School compete in three age group categories namely the Under-14, Under-16, also known as Colts, and Under-19, that is, the Manning Cup team, along with a special old-boys over-35 match. Both schools vie for the Keane-Crosskill Shield. The competition was created in commemoration of two outstanding individuals – Dr. Keane, a Calabar Old Boy and Hugh Crosskill, a Jamaica College Old Boy who both died in 2004.

=== Field Hockey ===
Jamaica College competes in both the Under-16 and Under-19 divisions of the ISSA-sponsored JHF Hockey League. In 2011, Jamaica College became champions of the Under-19 division and placed third in the Under-16. As of January 2014, Jamaica College is the 3-time Under-19 defending champions.

== Insignia ==
=== School crest ===
The left half of the school's crest incorporates the red cross of England and the five golden pineapples that is to be found on Jamaica's Coat of Arms. The pineapple symbolizes justice, trust and honour, and each pineapple plant gives its own life to produce a single fruit. Around 1681, Sir Christopher Wren had begun using pineapple finials on churches and since then, the fruit has been recognized as a Christian symbol. The pine cone has a long-held imperial significance. The Romans placed pine cones on their buildings and monuments to symbolize confidence in the administrative, judicial and defensive power of the state. This cross therefore demonstrates the school's Christian background and allegiance and association to Jamaica.

There is an open book in the top right section of the shield to symbolise Bible truth, justice, and the importance of scholarly focus and academic pursuits. A golden griffin against a dark blue background completes the right half of the shield. The griffin, being the combination of the lion (king of beasts) and the eagle (most powerful and recognised bird of prey) represents the best of both creatures in terms of their characteristics and status – similar traits are to be displayed by each student. Finally, the shield is surrounded by a scroll with the school's motto inscribed around the entire circumference.

=== Motto ===
The most commonly used form of the school motto is "Fervet opus in campis". In full, it is "Floreat collegium, fervet opus in campis". The complete Latin motto is literally translated as "May the college flourish, work is burning in the field". The inspiration for the school's motto stems from the harnessing of one's energy and motivation to enable success, especially in study. Students are taught that there must be the "fervet opus", that is figuratively, we must not only strike the iron while it is hot, but strike it till it is made hot. Following on this, a proverb states that "He who has heart has everything" ("che non arde non incende", who doth not burn doth not inflame). It is astonishing how much may be accomplished in self-culture by the energetic and the persevering, who are careful to avail themselves of opportunities, and use up the fragments of spare time which the idle permit to run to waste.

=== Mascot ===
Jamaica College has never had an official mascot although the griffin is almost always cited as one.

=== Nickname ===
The nickname "True Blue" or sometimes "The Dark Blues" is based on the school's official colour of navy blue. Alumni affirm their association with the school by proclaiming to be "True Blue" graduates, loosely associated with the English idiom meaning to be indubitably loyal or faithful. More recently, the team of students who participate in FIRST's Robotics Competition have adopted "Gold Griffins" as a team name, a direct reference to the griffin which is found on the schools' crest.

== Associations ==
=== Alumni Association ===
The Jamaica College Old Boys' Association (JCOBA) was established as a medium for alumni to continually support and represent Jamaica College. The JCOBA holds an annual meeting at the World Bank Building on the school's premises every November. For the Jamaica Chapter, the democratically elected board members convene on a monthly basis. There are other officially recognised chapters located in Toronto, Ontario, Canada, the state of Florida and New York City, New York.

=== Jamaica College Foundation ===
The Jamaica College Foundation was established in order to assist the school's administration and Board of Management. The mandate includes the creation and maintenance of a physical environment which features grounds, structures and facilities.

=== Parent-Teacher Association ===
The Jamaica College Parent-Teacher Association (PTA) provides the opportunity for parents and teachers to plan, report and interact on activities related to the interest of the school and the students. The PTA is involved in all aspects of school life. It contributes extensively to school activities, assists in physical improvements through projects, contributes significantly to the welfare programme that provides financial support to students, provides mentorship, assists in study sessions, and supports sports. The PTA also spearheads the Parent Representatives, where parents volunteer to serve as a liaison between the parents and teachers of each class.

== Notable alumni ==
The school has produced numerous prominent members of Jamaican society including:

=== Academia ===
- Gladstone E. Mills, O.J., C.D., professor emeritus in the Department of Government, University of the West Indies.
- Stuart Hall, professor emeritus of sociology at the Open University.

=== Arts, media and culture ===
- Dennis Scott, playwright, poet, dancer, choreographer and actor (best known for appearances on The Cosby Show).
- Geoffrey Philp, writer.
- Glen Campbell, actor and comedian.
- John Hearne, novelist, journalist and teacher.
- Kwame Dawes, professor in English and Emmy Award-winning poet; author, musician and critic.
- Louis Marriott, playwright, actor, director and journalist.
- Michael G. Smith, poet and social anthropologist.
- Monty Alexander, internationally renowned Jazz pianist.

=== Business and finance ===
- Derick M. Latibeaudiere, Bank of Jamaica Governor (1996–2009).

=== Politics and law ===
- R. James deRoux, C.D., JP, Custos Rotulorum of Clarendon (1981–2011)
- Bruce Golding, former Prime Minister of Jamaica from 2007 to 2011, leader of the Jamaica Labour Party.
- Douglas Saunders, Jamaican diplomat (currently Cabinet Secretary in the Jamaican Prime Minister's cabinet).
- Michael Manley, O.N., O.C.C., Prime Minister of Jamaica (1972–1980, 1989–1992).
- Norman W. Manley, M.M., Q.C., National Hero, Chief Minister of Jamaica (1955–1959), Premier of Jamaica (1959–1962).
- Noel Newton Nethersole, Jamaica's Finance Minister from 1955 to 1959
- Patrick L. Robinson, President of the International Criminal Tribunal for the Former Yugoslavia.
- Seymour Mullings, O.J., C.D., former Deputy Prime Minister of Jamaica (1993–2001).
- Richard Bernal, O.J., Jamaica's Ambassador to the United States.
- Eric Anthony Abrahams
- Peter Phillips (Jamaican politician), Leader of Opposition 2017–2020
- Roy Black (attorney)

=== Sporting ===
- James "Jimmy" Adams, former Jamaica and West Indies cricketer and Technical Director of the Jamaica Cricket Association (since 2008).
- Nicholas Addlery, Jamaica national football player.
- Bertrand Milbourne Clark, golf, cricket and tennis.
- Keammar Daley, Jamaica national football player.
- Fabian Dawkins, Jamaica national football player.
- Jerome Jordan, professional basketball player.
- Nick Richards, professional basketball player similar to Jerome Jordan.

== Notable staff ==
Notable staff of the school include:

- Dennis Ziadie, Under-19 (Manning Cup) football coach (1970–1975).
- Derek Alton Walcott, OBE, O.C.C., renowned Saint Lucian poet, playwright, writer and visual artist who was awarded the Nobel Prize in Literature; taught at Jamaica College 1953–1957.

== Headmasters ==
The following lists present the principals of Jamaica College during its entire history.

Drax Free School, Jamaica Free School and Jamaica High School (1789–1885)

Principal	Tenure
Rev. G. Ledwich	1810–1815
Rev. L. Bowerbank	1816–1818
Rev. Urquhart Gillespie Rose	1818–1825
Rev. Geo Watson Askew, B.A.	1826–1828
Rev. T. H. Gegg, A.M.	1829– ?
Rev. O. Handford, M.A.	? –1855
Rev. Morrison Myers	1855–1861
Rev. John Leslie Main, B.A.	1862–1883
Archdeacon William Simms	1883–1885

Jamaica College (1885 onwards)

Principal	Tenure
Archdeacon William Simms	1885–1915
William S. Cowper	1916–1933
Reginald Myrie Murray^{†}, Rhodes Scholar	1933–1941
Joseph W. S. Hardie (son of Bishop William G. Hardie)	1941–1945
Hugo Carl Winston Chambers^{†}	1945–1960
Vincent H. Ennever^{†}	1960–1964
William Haydn Middleton	1965–1970
Ruel L. Taylor	1971–1993
Lloyd Bryan	1993–1995
Tim Akpeti (acting)	1995–1996
Stuart Reeves	1997–2006
Ruel B. Reid	2006–2016
Rohan Wong (acting)	2016
Wayne D. Robinson†	since 2017

^{†} indicates principals who attended Jamaica College

== See also ==
- Education in Jamaica
- High School Football Champions in Jamaica
- List of Schools in Jamaica
