= Glen Campbell (actor) =

Jamaican actor and comedian (born 1964)

Glen Campbell OD
- Born: August 25, 1964 (age 62); London, England
- Other names: Goatie; Titus
- Education: Jamaica College; Hope Valley Experimental School
- Occupations: Actor, comedian
- Known for: Titus in Town
- Spouse: Maxine Hale
- Children: 2

Comedy career
- Years active: c.1987–present
- Medium: Theatre; Television; Film
- Genres: Comedy; Satire; Pantomime
- Subjects: Jamaican culture; Social commentary

Glenroy Godfrey Campbell (born 25 August 1964) is a Jamaican actor and comedian, known for his role in the 1980s Jamaica Broadcasting Corporation television series Titus in Town.

== Biography ==
Glen was born in London, England to Jamaican parents. He grew up in Jamaica, where he attended Hope Valley Experimental School, and Jamaica College, where his school friends gave him the nickname "Goatie", for his excellent impersonation of the animal braying. He was a leading member of the drama club that comprised students from JC and the girls' school, St Andrew High School.

His first performances on the main stage were when he was still a JC student, in Louis Marriott's 1981 stage production of Playboy, alongside leading actress Fae Ellington. He also gained national recognition for his performance as the bulging eyed policeman in the Fabulous Five Inc. music video for "Ring Road".

Campbell has been nominated for the Actor Boy Award more times than any other Jamaican actor, and has been nominated almost every year he has been acting on stage. He won it in 1999 for his roles in Breadfruit Kingdom.

In 2016, Campbell married Maxine Hale at the St Margaret's Church in Liguanea, in the suburbs of Kingston, Jamaica.

In 2019, Campbell's achievements in the field of theatre were recognised by the Jamaican government, who awarded him the Order of Distinction (OD).

== Filmography ==
- Titus in Town (1980s)
- Entry Denied (1996)
- Third World Cop (1999)
- Small Island (2009), as Mr Philip Roberts
- Shoot the Girl (2017)
- Sprinter (2017)

== Theatre ==
- Playboy (1981), written by Louis Marriott
- Office Chase (1982)
- Smile Orange (1993)
- Run for your Wife (1995)
- State of Emergency (1996)
- Oliver & Pinocchio (1998)
- Breadfruit Kingdom (1999)
- Dirty Diana (2001)
- Cindy-Relisha and the DJ Prince (2003) as Prince Sheggy and Tipsy
- Cindy Relisha & the DJ Prince (2002)
- Christopher Come Buck Us (2003)
- Ras Noah and the Hawk (2005)
- Class of 73 (2006)
- Love Games (2007), written by Patrick Brown
- Charlie's Angels (2011)
- Ladies of the Night (2013)
- Baby Scam (2015)
- Duppy Whisperer (2015)
- Matey Chronicles (2017)
