= Julian Rogers =

Caribbean broadcaster and journalist (born 1947)

Julian Rogers MBE
- Born: Julian Ernest Chetvynde Rogers; 11 November 1947 (age 78); Bridgetown, Barbados
- Education: University of the West Indies; Syracuse University
- Occupation: Broadcaster and journalist

Julian Ernest Chetvynde Rogers MBE (born 11 November 1947 in Barbados) is a Caribbean broadcaster and journalist. He has worked as broadcast manager, TV and radio host and producer, publisher, trainer, lecturer, media consultant and public relations professional. Involved since the 1970s with the building of national radio stations notably in Barbados, St Kitts and Nevis, and Antigua and Barbuda, and part of "the original team set up to 'revolutionise' the media industry in Trinidad and Tobago with the rebranding of the Trinidad and Tobago Television Company (TTT) into CNMG", he has been called "the Caribbean man" and has established a reputation as one of the region's most respected media practitioners. His characteristic style as a broadcaster is to conduct biting interviews; one commentator refers to "the persistent journalistic exploits of a resurgent, sharp-witted and emphatic Julian Rogers".

Among initiatives in regional news-gathering and dissemination with which he has been associated, his TV talk show Talk Caribbean (1998–2000) – featuring hour-long interviews with guests ranging from politicians to entertainers – was "the Caribbean Broadcasting Union's first attempt at live interactive television". His live broadcasts continue to break new ground for Caribbean television and radio, as with his 2007 coverage of the Trinidad and Tobago general elections, "CNews – Campaign 41", and his anchoring of the live broadcast covering the inaugural ceremony of the Caribbean Court of Justice (CCJ), which took place in Trinidad and Tobago in April 2005. Additionally, in November 2010, his commentary at the state funeral of Barbadian Prime Minister David Thompson was among the applauded "outstanding contributions of famous media gurus" coordinated by Starcom Network.

Rogers is currently managing director of the Jamaica Observer, taking over the position from Danville Walker in 2019.

== Biography ==
=== Education ===
Julian Rogers was born of Guyanese parentage in Bridgetown, Barbados, and was educated at Cooperative High School, Barbados (1960–64), where he was a Foundation Scholarship winner. He attended the University of the West Indies, Caribbean Institute of Mass Media at Mona, Jamaica (1974–75), on a UNESCO scholarship, receiving a Diploma in Mass Communications for his thesis "The creation of an exchange regime for Caribbean radio and television programming and production", which was later converted into a UNESCO-funded project for the Caribbean Broadcasting Union. He also attended Syracuse University (1980) as a member of the International Media Program, and was on attachment to WCCO television and radio in Minneapolis.

=== Broadcast and media career ===
Rogers began his career as a broadcaster at the age of 16, in March 1964, when he joined the Barbados Rediffusion Service as a scriptwriter, eventually becoming a radio announcer, outside broadcast commentator and producer. In 1969, three years after the launch of television in Barbados, he hosted one of the first game shows in the region.

Moving to Montserrat in 1970, he was an announcer for Radio Antilles, hosting their morning show. As manager of their English Service (1976–77), he reformatted the station and established the Caribbean correspondents' news network, a forerunner of the Caribbean News Agency. The station delivered breaking news of the Caribbean for much of the 1970s and 1980s.

In 1971, Rogers was appointed Programme Director of ZDK Radio, in Antigua & Barbuda, establishing the country's first non-government-owned commercial radio station. Until March 1972 he hosted the morning show and anchored the major evening newscast.

Back in Barbados, he worked for the Caribbean Broadcasting Corporation (CBC) (1977–79) as a television news anchor, hosting and producing programmes such as Understanding (with young panellists including a future prime minister of Barbados, David Thompson), Window on the World and Yearenders. As a television host, Rogers has been acknowledged with setting standards of competence for the Caribbean comparable with those of Larry King in the USA. During a subsequent stint at CBC (1981–82) he acted as the company's Programme Manager and Head of Productions. He then worked for eight years, from 1982 to 1990, as Programme Director for Barbados Rediffusion's Voice of Barbados, which he was responsible for rebranding.

From 1993 to 1995, he was general manager of Prime Radio 106, a subsidiary of Caribbean Communications Network (CCN) in Trinidad and Tobago, for which he then became an anchor on TV6 (1995–98). He became a pioneer of breakfast television in the country, launching Trinidad's first live morning television talk show with producer Natalie Williams.

In May 1998, Rogers returned to Barbados, where he produced and hosted the country's first morning television show, Wake Up Caribbean, for CBC.

He went on to establish the first independent radio station in St Kitts, Winn FM, in 2000, and the following year supervised the setting up of Antigua & Barbuda's first independent radio station.

Rogers was also the publisher of the Sunday Scoop newspaper, founded in 2004 in Antigua & Barbuda.

As chief content officer and a member of the executive group of Caribbean New Media Group Limited (CNMG), from 2007 to 2008, he directed the development of content for what was to be the most modern national television, radio and new media company in the Caribbean, which "drew on technology and drew on the professionals in the industry to create something that surpassed all other media houses throughout the region". He also served as their Head of News and Current Affairs.

Later based in Antigua and Barbuda, where in 2001 he was consultant in the setting up of Observer Radio, Rogers was general manager of the Observer Media Group under the chairmanship of Winston Derrick, overseeing the operations of two radio stations – Observer Radio and Hitz FM – as well as the Daily Observer newspaper, while continuing to develop strategies for international and Caribbean-wide media coverage, particularly since the closure of the BBC Caribbean service.

As managing editor of Guardian Media Limited, Rogers oversaw a major redevelopment of the Trinidad Guardian, CNC3-TV and TBC Radio Network, before being appointed managing director of the Jamaica Observer in 2019, taking over the position from Danville Walker.

=== Consultancy work ===
Since 1975, Rogers has worked as an independent consultant to both government and private sector throughout the Caribbean region, including Guyana, Belize, Barbados, Jamaica, Montserrat, Antigua and Barbuda, St Kitts and Nevis, St Maarten and Anguilla. He was Corporate Communications Consultant for LIME (Landline, Internet, Mobile, Entertainment), serving as a member of the team working on the transformation of the 13-country business units into one pan-Caribbean company (June 2008 – February 2009). He has been an adviser to several regional and international institutions on media development and to the University of the West Indies on media training.

As a trainer, he has been employed by Voice of America, and conducted a study of Caribbean television and radio content suitable for exchange under the aegis of the Caribbean Broadcasting Union and UNESCO.

In addition, Rogers has served on the Advisory Council to the Prime Ministerial Sub-Committee on the CARICOM Single Market and Economy and sits on the Regional Advisory Board of the Jamaica-based Caribbean Institute for Media and Communication (CARIMAC).

He established a company in Antigua and Barbuda to manage radio and television operations and provide media consultancy services, and in November 2014 launched a radio station, Rogers Radio Caribbean.

== Controversy ==
In 1998, while based in Trinidad, Rogers found himself at the centre of a national controversy when the then Prime Minister of Trinidad and Tobago, Basdeo Panday, refused to renew his work permit, leading to widespread protests by many, who felt the move was motivated by the fact that guests critical of the government had been among those featured on Rogers' popular early-morning current affairs show Morning Edition. At a UNESCO meeting entitled "The Caribbean Media: Freedom and Understanding", held at the Jamaica Conference Centre in Kingston, Jamaica, on World Press Freedom Day, 3 May 1998, a resolution was taken to: "Urge the Government of Trinidad and Tobago to change its regrettable decision and grant permission to Barbados journalist and national, Julian Rogers, so that he may continue his work in Trinidad and Tobago."

Following a 2001 controversy in Antigua surrounding work permits for Caribbean journalists, in 2002 Rogers and fellow broadcaster Julius Gittens were the first two Barbadians to be accredited under the CARICOM Skilled Nationals programme, granting freedom of movement within the Caribbean community.

== Honours ==
Rogers was appointed Member of the Order of the British Empire (MBE) in the 2014 Birthday Honours for services to broadcasting, receiving the award in Barbados from Governor General Sir Elliott Belgrave on 14 November 2014.

In February 2020, Rogers was recognised by the University of the West Indies, Mona, for his "outstanding contribution to the media and communications landscape in Jamaica and the Caribbean".
