= Shirley Miller =

Jamaican QC and judge

- Born: Shirley Isabelle Meikle; 1937 (age 88–89); Port Maria, Colony of Jamaica, British Empire
- Occupations: attorney, judge
- Years active: 1961–present

Shirley Miller OJ, CD, KC (born 1937) is a Jamaican attorney and one of the first women admitted as Queen's Counsel in the Caribbean. Admitted to the inner bar in 1971, she became the first Queen's Counsel in Jamaica and has served in numerous capacities, including as head of the Legal Reform Department and on the Electoral Advisory Committee. She served on a committee of three to review Jamaica's Charter of Fundamental Rights and Freedoms and was honored as a commander in the Order of Distinction, as well as receiving the Order of Jamaica for her contributions to legal reform.

== Early life ==
Shirley Isabelle Meikle was born in 1937 in Port Maria, of Saint Mary Parish, Jamaica to Minette P. (née Walter) and Hugh Osmond Meikle. Her father worked in the hardware business and Meikle had two siblings, a brother and a sister. She attended primary school in Port Maria and then completed her secondary education as boarding student at St. Hilda’s Diocesan High School of Brown's Town. Influenced by Ena Collymore-Woodstock and the admiration her parents had for the female magistrate, Meikle decided to study law. Before going to Europe, she worked for a year at a law firm in Port Maria to gain practical experience and then in 1955, she won the Jamaica Centenary Scholarship to read law in London at Lincoln's Inn. She enrolled in the London School of Economics and graduated with honours attaining a Bachelor of Laws. Exempt from taking the first examination for the bar because of her work at Lincoln's Inn, Meikle took first in the second part of the examination, winning the Buchanan Prize, and was called to the British Bar in 1961.

== Career ==
Meikle remained in England for a year, studying with British Crown Counselor Ralph Miller. Returning to Jamaica in late 1962, she was hired as a Deputy Clerk of the Courts. Meikle married Edward Lyel Miller on 9 February 1963 and a few months later, on 25 August 1963, she was appointed as Assistant Crown Counsel. In 1964, she gave birth to her first child, Megan and two years later to a son, Edward. Between 1964 and 1973, Miller served as secretary of the Law Reform Committee. In 1966, she was promoted to Crown Counsel and joined the Jamaica Bar in 1969. The following year, Miller became the Assistant Attorney General and in 1971 was admitted as a Queen's Counsel. In 1972, she earned the title of Senior Assistant Attorney General and two years later was made Divisional Director. In 1978, Miller was honoured as a Commander in the Order of Distinction for her contributions to public law.

In addition to her work in the courts, throughout the 1980s and 1990s Miller has served as the head of legal reform in the Ministry of Justice, as a Chief Justice, and as an independent member of the Electoral Advisory Committee (1979–1993). In 1985, she was honored with the Women of Distinction Award from the Bureau of Women’s Affairs in recognition of the United Nations Decade for Women, having made significant contributions in her field. In 2004, Miller was the recipient of the Order of Jamaica for her work on legal reforms and was appointed to the Privy Council. She was appointed in 2008, along with Lloyd Barnett and Edward Seaga, by Prime Minister Bruce Golding to review the proposed legislation for the Charter of Fundamental Rights and Freedoms, which was enacted the following year. She was reappointed to the Privy Council in 2016.
