= Rita Humphries-Lewin =

Jamaican stockbroker and businesswoman

Rita Humphries-Lewin OJ CD (born 1936) is a Jamaican retired stockbroker and businesswoman. She was the first woman to chair the Jamaica Stock Exchange and the first woman to chair a stock exchange in the Caribbean. She founded Barita Investments Limited in 1977, which was the oldest stock brokerage firm in Jamaica by the time she retired in 2021.

== Early life ==
Humphries-Lewin was born in 1936. She attended the Immaculate Conception High School. Upon graduating, she joined the Gleaner Company as a secretary. In 1962, while working as a secretary for the local branch of Canadian stock trading firm Annett & Company, she responded to a solicitation for new traders. The company required all new traders to spend six months as trainees at the head office in Canada, and she saw that male candidates did not want to "go back to school". After her training, Humphries-Lewin returned to Jamaica and completed the Canadian Securities Course. In 1967, she became a certified stockbroker.

When the Jamaica Stock Exchange (JSE) opened in 1969, Humphries-Lewin was Annett's designated trader on the exchange floor. After Annett went out of business in 1972, she moved to the public sector, helping to establish the Jamaica Industrial Developmental Corporation and the Small Business Development Centre.

== Career ==
After several years in the public sector, Humphries-Lewin wanted to return to the private sector. Her former colleagues from Annett had joined insurance companies as investment managers. However, it was difficult to trade on the JSE as many stock brokerage firms had folded due to Jamaica's economic problems. This left Humphries-Lewin with the chance to start her own brokerage to fill in the gap. She founded Barita Investments in 1977 with $10,000 of her own money. The company was named for herself and her sister Barbara. Besides Humphries-Lewin, the sole other initial employee was a messenger to handle deliveries.

Humphries-Lewin was chair of the Jamaica Stock Exchange in 1984 and again from 1995 to 2000. During her tenure, she led the establishment of the Jamaica Central Securities Depository Limited (JCSD) in 1998 and the development of electronic trading in 2000. She was chair of the Development Bank of Jamaica from 2001 to 2006, participating in the development of Highway 2000 and a planned resort in Trelawny Parish.

She led Barita Investments to its initial public offering on the JSE in 2010. She entered talks to sell a controlling stake in the company around 2017; as the largest shareholder, she owned 76% of the company. In 2018, Cornerstone Investments Holdings Limited paid $3B for a 75% stake from her and a minority shareholder. As part of the deal, Humphries-Lewin agreed to hold at least 2% of the company for two years afterward, and remain on the company's board of directors. She announced her retirement from Barita in January 2021.

=== Recognition ===
In 2000 she received the Order of Distinction, Commander Class from the Government of Jamaica for her contributions to the country's financial industry. She also received an honorary doctorate in educational leadership from Mico University College for her contribution to early childhood development.
