= Carolyn Cooper =

Jamaican literary scholar and writer (born 1950)

Carolyn Cooper CD
- Born: Carolyn Joy Cooper; 20 November 1950 (age 75); Kingston, Colony of Jamaica, British Empire
- Education: University of the West Indies, Mona, Jamaica; University of Toronto, Ontario, Canada
- Occupations: Author, literary scholar, columnist, TV host
- Website: carolynjoycooper.wordpress.com

Carolyn Cooper CD (born 20 November 1950) is a Jamaican author, essayist and literary scholar. She is a former professor of Literary and Cultural Studies at the University of the West Indies, Mona, Jamaica. From 1975 to 1980, she was an assistant professor at Atlantic Union College in South Lancaster, Massachusetts. In 1980, she was appointed as a lecturer in the Department of Literatures in English at the University of the West Indies (UWI), where she continued to work until her retirement as a professor in 2017. Also a newspaper journalist, Cooper writes a weekly column for the Sunday Gleaner.

== Biography ==
=== Early years and education ===
Carolyn Joy Cooper was born in 1950 in Kingston, Jamaica, to parents who were members of the Seventh-day Adventist Church. She attended St Hugh's High School in Kingston.

In 1968, she was awarded the Jamaica Scholarship (Girls). She attended the University of the West Indies, Mona, graduating with a Bachelor of Arts degree in English (B.A. English) in 1971. She was awarded a Canadian International Development Agency fellowship to the University of Toronto, Ontario, Canada, in 1971 to study for her master's degree in English, which was followed by the completion of her PhD at the same institution in 1977.

=== Academic career ===
In 1980, Cooper was appointed as a lecturer in the Department of Literatures in English at the University of the West Indies, where she taught courses on Caribbean, African-American and African literature, as well as popular culture.

She was instrumental in establishing in 1994 the Reggae Studies Unit at the University of the West Indies, Mona, which has hosted numerous public lectures and symposiums featuring reggae/dancehall artists and other practitioners in the music industry in Jamaica and internationally such as Lady Saw, Vybz Kartel, Bounty Killer, Tony Rebel, Ninjaman, Louise Frazer-Bennett, Christine Hewett, Tanya Stephens, Gentleman and Queen Ifrica.

Cooper founded the annual Bob Marley Lecture in 1997. The Reggae Studies Unit has also convened academic conferences, including in 2008 the Global Reggae Conference, the plenary papers for which are collected in Global Reggae (2012), edited by Cooper and published by the University of the West Indies Press. With Dr Eleanor Wint, Cooper co-edited Bob Marley: The Man and His Music (2003), a selection of papers presented at the 1995 symposium that marked the reggae icon's 50th birthday.

In 2017, Cooper retired from being professor of literary and cultural studies at UWI. Selected presentations by her are held at UWI Archives.

=== Writing and media work ===
Cooper is the author of the books Noises in the Blood: Orality, Gender and the "Vulgar" Body of Jamaican Popular Culture (1993) and Sound Clash: Jamaican Dancehall Culture at Large (2004), as well as numerous articles, book chapters, conference presentations and plenary lectures.

A well-known media personality in Jamaica, she is a weekly columnist for the Sunday Gleaner. In the 1990s, she co-hosted a television show, Man and Woman Story, with Dr Leahcim Semaj for the Jamaica Broadcasting Corporation. She also co-hosted a public affairs programme, Question Time on CVM Television, and, more recently, Big People Sup'm on PBC Jamaica.

Cooper is a contributor to the 2019 anthology New Daughters of Africa, edited by Margaret Busby.

== Selected works ==
=== Books written by Carolyn Cooper ===
- Noises in the Blood: Orality, Gender and the "Vulgar" Body of Jamaican Popular Culture (1995)
- Sound Clash: Jamaican Dancehall Culture at Large (2004)

=== Books edited by Carolyn Cooper ===
- Bob Marley: The Man and His Music (2003), with Eleanor Wint
- Global Reggae (2012)

=== Articles ===
- "Loosely talking theory: Oral/Sexual Discourse in Jamaican Popular Culture", The CRNLE Reviews Journal, 1, 1994, pp. 62–73.
- "Lyrical Gun: Metaphor and Role Play in Jamaican Dancehall Culture", The Massachusetts Review, Vol. 35, Issues 3 & 4, 1994, pp. 429–447.
- "Race and the Cultural Politics of Self-representation: A View from the University of the West Indies", Research in African Literatures, 27, 1996, pp. 97–105.
- "Ragamuffin sounds: Crossing over from reggae to rap and back", Caribbean Quarterly, Vol. 44, nos 1 & 2, 1998, pp. 153–168.
- "'West Indies plight': Louise Bennett and The Cultural Politics of Federation", Social and Economic Studies, 48, 1999, pp. 211–228.
- "Punany Powah", Black Media Journal, 2, 2000, pp. 50–52.
- "Enslaved in Stereotypes: Race and Representation in Post-independence Jamaica", Small Axe, 16, 2004, pp. 154–169.
- "Not Even One Token Woman!", Stabroek News, 21 February 2011.
- "Another milestone on KC's journey", The Gleaner, 1 June 2018.
- "UWI celebrates 50-plus years of teaching fi wi literature", The Gleaner, 6 June 2021.
- "King Charles must rise above impotent talk of 'sorrow' for slavery", openDemocracy, 3 May 2023.
- "Butchering 'di patwah daktah' in defence of English", The Gleaner, 11 February 2024.
- "Kingsley Cooper, one man wid vision", The Gleaner, 23 June 2024.

== Awards ==
- Association of Commonwealth Universities Academic Exchange Fellow, University of the South Pacific, Fiji, September–October 1993
- The Jamaica Gleaner listed Cooper as sixth in their list of "The 10 Best-Dressed Men & Women of 2011".
- Order of Distinction in the rank of Commander (CD), August 2013, "for outstanding contribution to Education".
