= Douglas Saunders (disambiguation) =

Douglas Saunders may refer to:

- Douglas Saunders, Jamaican politician
- Doug Saunders, Canadian journalist
- Doug Saunders (baseball) (born 1969), baseball player
