= Faes =

Faes or FAES may refer to:

== People ==
- Inge Faes (born 1973), Belgian politician
- Pieter Faes (1750–1814), Flemish painter
- Rolf Faes (1916–1983), Swiss handball player
- Wout Faes (born 1998), Belgian footballer

== Other uses ==
- FAES (Fundación para el Análisis y los Estudios Sociales), a Spanish think tank
- FAES (Venezuela) (Fuerzas de Acciones Especiales de la Policía Nacional Bolivariana), national police unit
- Fae folk, or fairies
- Faés, an uninhabited island in Laamu Atoll, Maldives
- Fellow of the American Epilepsy Society

== See also ==
- FAE (disambiguation)
