= Latibeaudiere =

Latibeaudiere is a surname. Notable people with the surname include:

- Derick Latibeaudiere (born 1951), Jamaican businessman and banker
- Joel Latibeaudiere (born 2000), English footballer
