= Stephen Francis (coach) =

Vincent Stephen Francis (3 July 1962 – 4 July 2026) was a Jamaican track and field coach. He co-founded the MVP Track & Field Club in Kingston in 1999 and served as its technical director.

== Early life and education ==
Francis was born on 3 July 1962. He earned a Bachelor of Science in management studies from the University of the West Indies and a Master of Business Administration in finance from the University of Michigan.

== Career ==
Francis worked as a business accountant before he moved into full-time coaching. In 1999, he co-founded MVP with his brother Paul Francis, Bruce James and David Noel. The club was based at the University of Technology, Jamaica, where Francis was also head coach.

Brigitte Foster-Hylton was the first athlete to join MVP, and Asafa Powell joined the group in 2001. Francis coached Powell when he set the 100 metres world record at 9.77 seconds in 2005 and 9.74 seconds in 2007. He coached Shelly-Ann Fraser-Pryce to Olympic 100 metres titles in 2008 and 2012.

In September 2008, The Gleaner reported that athletes coached by Francis had won more than half of Jamaica's medals at the 2008 Summer Olympics. He coached Elaine Thompson-Herah to Olympic 100 metres and 200 metres titles at the 2016 and 2020 Summer Olympics. He stepped down as head coach of MVP with effect from 1 September 2017, and Paul Francis succeeded him.

At the 2024 Summer Olympics, Francis coached Kishane Thompson to the silver medal in the men's 100 metres. Francis died in hospital on 4 July 2026, one day after his 64th birthday.

== Awards and honours ==
Francis held the Order of Distinction in the rank of Commander. He was appointedto the Order of Jamaica in the national honours list announced on 6 August 2017. The University of Technology, Jamaica conferred an honorary Doctor of Laws on him on 12 December 2021.
