= Christopher González =

Jamaican artist (1943–2008)

Christopher Francis González, OD (1943 – 2 August 2008) was a Puerto Rican-Jamaican expressionistic sculptor and painter.

== Biography ==
González was born in Kingston, Jamaica, in 1943. He had a Puerto Rican father and Jamaican mother. González graduated in 1963 from the Jamaica School of Art (The Edna Manley College of the Visual and Performing Arts), where he majored in sculpture. He later became a faculty member at the school. González earned his Master's degree in Fine Arts from the California College of Arts and Crafts. He taught at schools and institutions in Jamaica and the USA (California and Atlanta, Georgia) during his career.

He was influenced by Edna Manley and Pablo Picasso.

He lived and worked within the Saint Ann Parish area with his wife and family.

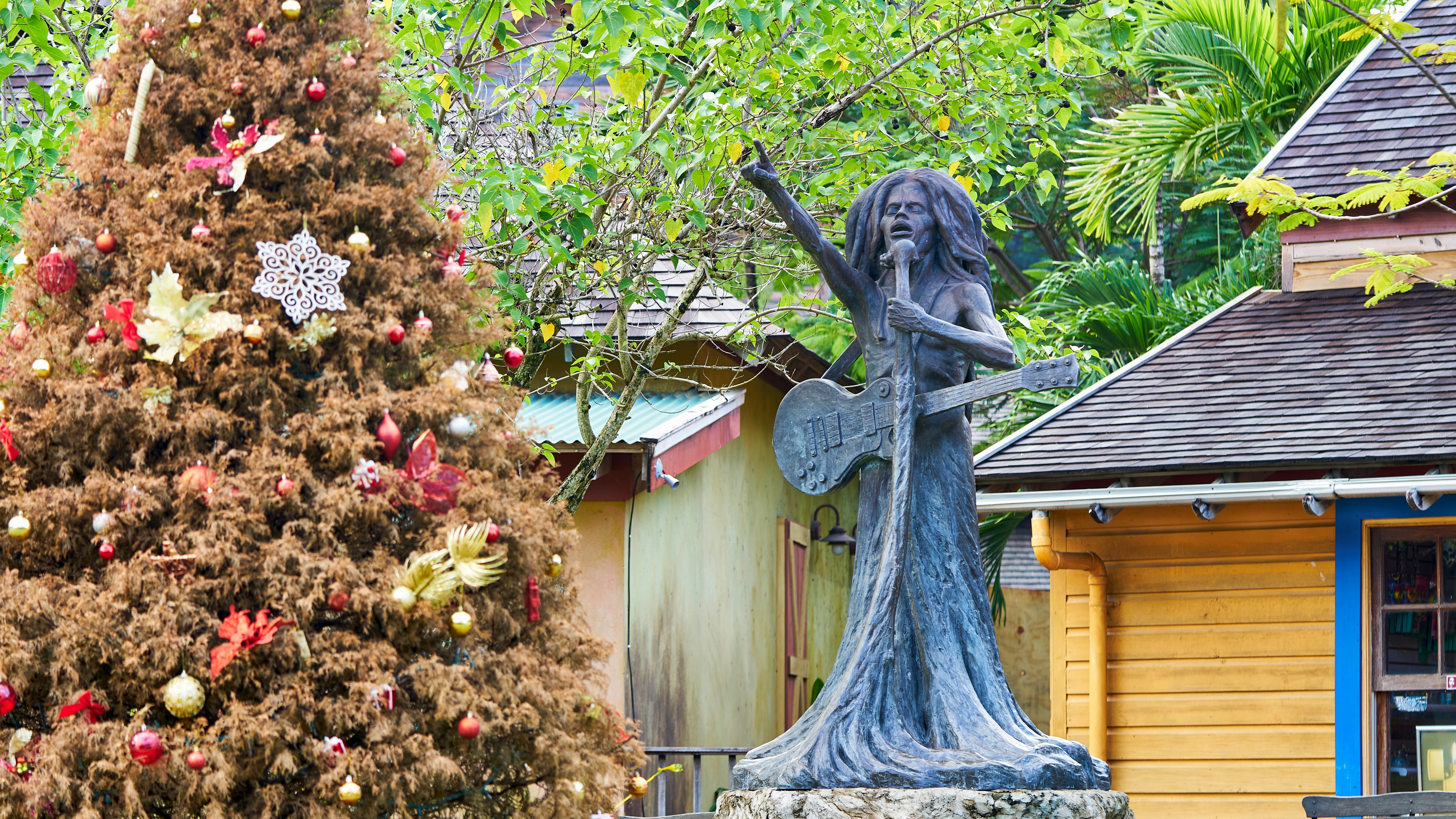
Bob Marley statue by Christopher González

González might be best known for a Jamaican-government commissioned 9-foot-tall (2.7 m) statue created in honor of Bob Marley, which is currently on display at a museum in Ocho Rios, Jamaica. The somewhat abstract statue depicts a figure with a tree trunk for a lower body and a distorted face. When the sculpture was unveiled on the second anniversary of the iconic reggae artist's death, angry Marley fans threw fruit and rocks at the bronze piece because, according to them, it didn't adequately represent the widely revered artist.

González was also well known for creating two bronze reliefs that commemorate Jamaican independence from colonial rule, and for a statue of national hero George William Gordon. He also worked on the tomb of the former Prime Minister of Jamaica, Norman Washington Manley. Within Jamaica, examples of González's work are displayed at the Jamaica National Heroes' Memorial, the National Gallery of Jamaica, the residence of the Prime Minister and the Bank of Jamaica. He also held both group and solo art shows in Jamaica, the United States, Denmark, Cuba, Canada and Mexico.

Christopher González died of cancer on 2 August 2008 at Cornwall Regional Hospital in Montego Bay, Jamaica, at the age of 65. He was survived by his wife, Champayne Clarke-Gonzalez, and six children: Chinyere, Odiaka, Asha, Christina González, Abenah González, and Nailah González. His daughter Christina González, known professionally as Chriss Choreo, became a renown Jamaican dancer and choreographer. His daughter Abenah González, known professionally as Bena González, is a renown fashion textile designer and dancehall recording artist.

== Awards ==
González was awarded an Order of Distinction for contributions towards art in the Jamaican society, and received several other awards including first prize at the Jamaica Fine Arts Festival Competition in 1965. He was also awarded the Silver Musgrave Medal in 1974.
