= Owen Gray =

Jamaican musician (1939–2025)

Owen Gray OD

Background information
- Born: 5 July 1939; Kingston, Jamaica
- Died: 20 July 2025 (aged 86)
- Genres: Ska, rocksteady, reggae, gospel
- Occupation: Singer-songwriter
- Instruments: Vocals, keyboards
- Years active: 1958–2025
- Labels: Studio One, Blue Beat Records, Trojan, Island, VP, Jet Star, Culture Press, Hawk Records, Vista Sounds, Burning Sounds Records, Secret Records Limited

Owen Gray OD (5 July 1939 – 20 July 2025), also known as Owen Grey, was a Jamaican musician. His work spans the R&B, ska, rocksteady, and reggae eras of Jamaican music, and he has been credited as Jamaica's first home-grown singing star.

== Life and career ==
Gray was born in Jamaica on 5 July 1939. He won his first talent contest at the age of nine, and by the age of 12 he was already appearing in public, playing drums, guitar, and keyboards. He attended the Alpha Boys School and turned professional aged 19. Gray was a dynamic performer on stage, who could be gritty or suave as the song dictated. He was the first singer (of many) to praise a sound system on record, with his "On the Beach" celebrating Clement Dodd's 'Sir Coxsone Downbeat' system in 1959, one of the first releases on Dodd's Studio One label. He was one of the first artists to be produced by Chris Blackwell, in 1960, and his "Patricia" single was the first record ever released by Island Records.

Gray's first single, "Please Let Me Go", reached the top of the charts in Jamaica, and featured a guitar solo from Australian musician Dennis Sindrey who was a member of The Caribs, a studio band that played on many early Owen Gray recordings. The single also sold well in the United Kingdom, as did subsequent releases, prompting Gray to emigrate there in May 1962. He toured Europe in 1964, and by 1966 he was well known as a soul singer as well as for his ska songs. During 1966, he worked in the UK and Europe with The Krew, then in 1967 with Tony Knights Chessmen.

In the rocksteady era, he recorded for producer Sir Collins. His popularity continued throughout the 1960s, working with producers such as Clement Dodd, Prince Buster, Sydney Crooks, Arthur "Duke" Reid, Leslie Kong, and Clancy Eccles, including work as a duo with Millie Small, with songs ranging from ska to ballads. He continued to record regularly, having a big hit in 1968 with "Cupid". His 1970 track "Apollo 12" found favour with the early skinheads, and in 1972 he returned to Island Records, recording reggae versions of The Rolling Stones' "Tumblin' Dice" and John Lennon's "Jealous Guy", although they met with little success. During this period, he regularly had releases on Pama and Pioneer Internacional label, Camel Records, and one single on Hot Lead Records. He had greater success in Jamaica, however, with "Hail the Man", a tribute to Emperor Haile Selassie, which was popular with the increasing Rastafari following.

In 1978, "This is Reggae", a song he co-wrote with Raymond Morrison and Tamara Edwards was released on Morrison's Hawk label. Morrison and Edwards comprised the Ram & Tam duo who had a hit with "Will You Love Me Tomorrow".

Gray spent a short time living in New Orleans before returning to Jamaica where he turned his hand to roots reggae, working with producer Bunny Lee, and achieving considerable success. In the 1980s relocated to Miami. He continued to release new material regularly, often concentrating on ballads and gospel music.

In August 2023 he was awarded the Jamaican Order of Distinction.

Gray died on 20 July 2025, at the age of 86.

== Discography ==
=== Albums ===
- Owen Gray Hit After Hit After Hit- Sydney Crooks (Pioneer Internacional)
- Owen Gray Sings (1961) Starlite (also Island Records in Jamaica)
- Cupid (1969)
- Forward on the Scene (1975) Third World
- Fire and Bullets (1977) Trojan
- Turning Point (1977) Venture
- Dreams of Owen Gray (1978) Trojan
- Battle of the Giants Round 1 (1983) Vista Sounds (with Pluggy Satchmo)
- Oldies But Goodies (1983) Vista Sounds (split with Delroy Wilson)
- Max Romeo Meets Owen Gray at King Tubby's Studio (1984) Culture Press (with Max Romeo)
- Little Girl (1984) Vista Sounds
- Owen Gray Sings Bob Marley (1984) Sarge
- This is Owen Gray, Pama
- Room at the Top (1986) World Enterprise
- Let's Make a Deal World Enterprise
- Watch This Sound (1986) Sky Note
- Stand By Me (1986) Hitbound
- Prince Buster Memory Lane (1986) Phill Pratt
- Instant Rapport (1989) Bushranger
- Ready Willing and Able (1989) Park Heights
- None of Jah-Jah's Children Shall Ever Suffer (198?) Imperial
- Living Image (1996) Genesis Gospel Singers
- Out in the Open (1997) VP
- The Gospel Truth vol 1 Bushranger
- Something Good Going On Bushranger
- Gospel Truth, vol. 2 (1997) Jet Star
- Derrick Morgan and Owen Gray (1998) Rhino (with Derrick Morgan)
- True Vibration (1998) Jet Star
- Do You Still Love Me (1998) First Edition
- The Gospel Truth vol. 3 (1999) Bushranger
- On Drive (2000) Jet Star
- Better Days (2002) Worldsound
- Let's Start All Over (2003) Jet Star
- Jesus Loves Me (2004) True Gospel
- Baby It's You (2005) Worldsound
- Mumbo Jumbo (2005) Revenge
- Miss Wire Waist -Pioneer Internacional (Sydney Crooks)
- Excellence (????), Bushranger
- Jamaica's First Homegrown Star (2020)
- Owen Gray – Little Girl + Hit After Hit After Hit (2020)
- Owen Gray – Singles 1969 – 1972 (2020)

=== Compilation albums ===
- Hit After Hit After Hit (1998) First Edition Pioneer Internacional
- Hit After Hit After Hit Vol 2 Pioneer Internacional
- Hit After Hit After Hit Vol 3 Pioneer Internacional
- Hit After Hit After Hit Vol 4 (198?) Pioneer Internacional
- Sly & Robbie Presents Owen Gray on Top (1994) Rhino
- Memory Lane Vol. 1 (2000) Sydney Crooks (Pioneer Internacional)
- Shook, Shimmy And Shake: The Anthology (2004) Trojan
