= Marshall Hall (economist) =

Jamaican economist and businessman (1934–2022)

The Honourable Marshall Hall OJ CD
- Born: Marshall McGowan Hall; 5 September 1934; Kingston, Colony of Jamaica, British Empire
- Died: 22 November 2022 (aged 88)
- Education: Columbia University; University of Wisconsin
- Occupations: Businessman; economist; university professor; banker
- Children: 3

Marshall McGowan Hall OJ CD (5 September 1934 – 22 November 2022) was a Jamaican economist, university professor, businessman and banker.

== Biography ==
=== Early life and education ===
Hall was born on 5 September 1934 in Kingston, Jamaica, and attended Kingston College. He graduated with a Bachelor's degree from Columbia University in 1957 before receiving his doctorate from the University of Wisconsin in 1960.

=== Career in academia and business ===
Hall specialised in microeconomics and institutional economics, teaching at the University of Wisconsin and Makerere University before gaining his professorship at the Washington University in St. Louis. He returned to Jamaica in 1972, where he served as Dean of the Faculty of Social Sciences at the University of the West Indies, Mona as well as Head of the Department of Management Studies (later the Mona School of Business). He also later served as a Director of the Caribbean Maritime University.

Hall subsequently pursued a career in business and banking, serving as chairman and chief executive officer of Jamaica Public Service and as Chairman of the Jamaica Development Bank (later the Development Bank of Jamaica). He also served as Chairman of the National Commercial Bank, Chairman of the Caribbean Policy Research Institute and was a member of the West Indian Commission, the Police Service Commission and Police Civilian Oversight Authority. Hall served perhaps most extensively in the leadership of the Jamaican Producers Group, where he promoted the expansion and modernisation of Jamaica's banana industry by thousands of acres.

=== Personal life and death ===
Hall was married to Jeanette Hall, with whom he had three children. He died on 22 November 2022, aged 88.

== Honours ==
Hall was conferred with the Order of Distinction (Commander Class) and, in 2010, the Order of Jamaica by the Jamaican government.
