= Ena Collymore-Woodstock =

Jamaican barrister and magistrate (1917–2025)

Ena Collymore-Woodstock OD MBE
- Born: Ena Joyce St. Clare Collymore; 10 September 1917; Spanish Town, Jamaica, British West Indies
- Died: 2 December 2025 (aged 108)
- Other names: Ena Joyce Collymore-Woodstock
- Occupations: Barrister, resident magistrate, radar operator
- Years active: 1940–1980

Ena Collymore-Woodstock OD MBE (10 September 1917 – 2 December 2025) was a Jamaican barrister and magistrate who throughout her career broke many barriers for women. After being orphaned, she joined the Auxiliary Territorial Service and trained as a radar operator, becoming the first black woman to do so, serving in Belgium and Britain in World War II. When the war ended, she earned a law degree and returned to Jamaica to become the first woman Court Clerk, Crown Solicitor, and Resident Magistrate. When the Juvenile Courts were established in the country, she served as its chair from 1964 to 1967 and then as a Senior Resident Magistrate until her retirement in 1977. Post-retirement, she served as magistrate for the Turks and Caicos and Anguilla. For her contributions to the development of Jamaica, she was honoured as a member of the Order of the British Empire and Jamaica's Order of Distinction.

== Early life ==
Ena Joyce St. Clare Collymore was born in 1917 in Spanish Town, Jamaica, which at the time was one of the colonies of the British West Indies, to Madeline Louise (née Anderson) and Frank Augustin Collymore. Her father was a stationmaster for the national railway and had lost an arm after falling from a train early in his career. He died when Collymore was young and she and her three siblings relocated with their mother to Kingston, where her mother was employed as the postmistress of Vineyard Town. Her two older sisters left school in their teens to help with maintaining the family while Collymore, the third daughter, completed her primary schooling at Central Branch School and went to St. Hugh's High School. Her mother died soon after her graduation.

== Career ==
Collymore moved into lodging at the YWCA, after living briefly with a married sister, and took a job as a bookkeeper at the Valentine Bakery. Needing to earn more money, she applied for a job as a temporary clerk in the Courthouse office. Initially she was turned down, as it was not seen as a job for a woman, but she persisted and was hired on a trial basis. Within a few years she was hired as the permanent clerk in the Kingston Criminal Court office. When the war began, Colleymore enlisted in the Auxiliary Territorial Service and was initially placed in the stenography pool in Jamaica. She trained for the nursing service, but seeking more excitement, asked to join the Anti-Aircraft Service and go overseas. From 1943 to 1946, she was the UK's first black woman radar operator and served as such in Belgium and the United Kingdom. Her last post was in the War Office in London. After the end of the war, she began her law studies at Gray's Inn in 1946 and also enrolled in a course on juvenile delinquency at the University of London. During her studies at Gray's Inn, she was the only female student to participate on the debating team and serve on the Student Union executive body. She was called to the bar in 1948.

Returning to Jamaica, she returned to her job in the criminal courts. She was then promoted as a Deputy Court Clerk for Saint Mary Parish and took a transfer promotion to serve as Clerk of Courts for St. James Parish. Her appointment as a Court Clerk was another first for women in Jamaica. In 1951, Collymore married Victor Woodstock, a civil servant, with whom she had three children. She was appointed an Assistant Crown Solicitor in 1953, also the first time a woman had held the post. Collymore-Woodstock was determined that her gender would not affect her career. Because her position caused her to have to travel the court circuit, she took her children with her to work.

In 1959, Collymore-Woodstock made history in Jamaica as the first woman Resident Magistrate to preside in the Civil Court. In 1962, three women were appointed to serve the Juvenile Court system. Collymore-Woodstock was appointed chair of the Eastern Circuit, Ena Allen was appointed over the Northwestern Circuit and Joyce Groves was assigned the Southern Circuit. The three women attended a four-month training course in the United States on juvenile justice. When the women finished their training, they toured the US to observe how the juvenile court system there operated. From 1964 to 1967, Collymore-Woodstock served as Chair of the Juvenile Court and thereafter returned to the Criminal Court of the Kingston Resident Magistrate's Court. By 1975, Woodstock was the Senior Resident Magistrate for St. Andrew Parish and that same year was honoured as an officer in the Order of Distinction for her contributions to the justice system of Jamaica. When a ministerial system was introduced to the Turks and Caicos in 1976, Collymore-Woodstock was contracted to serve as a magistrate for the British Overseas Territory. She retired from the Jamaican bench in 1977, but continued to serve post-retirement in the Turks and Caicos and in Anguilla.

=== Girl Guides ===
Among her many activities outside the legal profession, Collymore-Woodstock served as a District Commissioner for the Girl Guides and as chair of the Civil Service Housing Company and member of the Parish Council Service Commission. She was honoured as a member of the Order of the British Empire in 1967 for her work with the Girl Guides, which included serving as the Jamaican Chief Commissioner of the organisation from 1964 to 1974. She received the Silver Fish Award, the Girl Guide Commonwealth Headquarters' highest award for service to the organisation in 1972. She also served as president of the Caribbean Area Council of Soroptimist International.

== Personal life and death ==
Collymore-Woodstock turned 100 in September 2017. She died on 2 December 2025, at the age of 108.

== See also ==
- First women lawyers around the world
