= Paula Llewellyn =

Jamaican lawyer

Paula Vanessa Llewellyn CD KC is a Jamaican lawyer who served as the country's director of public prosecutions (DPP), 2008–2024. She was the first woman to hold the position.

== Early life ==
Llewellyn was born at the Victoria Jubilee Hospital in Kingston, one of the four children of Mavis and Clinton Llewellyn; her mother was a nurse and her father was a realtor. She grew up in Pembroke Hall, a suburb in Kingston's north, attending St. George's Primary School and St. Hugh's High School. Llewellyn went on to the University of the West Indies at Mona, attending the Norman Manley Law School. She did her internship in Antigua, but returned to Jamaica to take up a position as court clerk at the Saint James Parish magistrate's court, located in Montego Bay. In 1986, Llewellyn became a crown counsel in the Office of the Director of Public Prosecutions (ODPP). She was made a deputy director in 1993, and senior deputy director in 1999.

== Director of Public Prosecutions ==
In March 2008, Llewellyn was appointed director of public prosecutions – the first woman to hold the position. Unlike previous DPPs, who had been appointed simply on the recommendation of the prime minister, she had to apply through a competitive selection process administered by the Public Service Commission. Notable cases the ODPP has been involved with during her tenure include the murder trial of Vybz Kartel, the extradition of Christopher Coke, and bribery charges against Trafigura Beheer. She received death threats over the Kartel case, and was under police protection for a period. Llewellyn oversaw the publication of Jamaica's first Manual for Prosecutors in 2016, a "compilation of directives and guidelines that provide clear instruction and guidance to Jamaican prosecutors" based on similar publications in the UK and Canada. She has frequently criticised the Jamaican government for underresourcing her office and the justice system as a whole. Jamaica’s first woman Director of Public Prosecutions (DPP) Paula Llewellyn walked away from the job Sunday, April 21, 2024, 16 years after marching spectacularly into history, unable to survive the latest legal skirmish that had its genesis in parliamentary anguish.
