= Barbara Bailey (writer) =

Jamaican author, educator and scholar (born 1942)

The Honourable Barbara Bailey OJ
- Born: Barbara Evelyn Bailey; 14 March 1942 (age 84); Kingston, Colony of Jamaica, British Empire
- Education: University of the West Indies
- Occupations: Writer, educator, advocate
- Movement: Women's movement
- Awards: CARICOM Triennial Award for Women (2008)

Barbara Evelyn Bailey OJ (born 14 March 1942) is an educator, writer and gender studies scholar from Kingston, Jamaica. In addition to her education work, she has represented Jamaica at numerous conferences and assemblies regarding women's rights. In 2008, she was elected by the state parties as a member of the United Nations Committee on the Elimination of Discrimination against Women.

== Career ==
Bailey attended the University of the West Indies (UWI), where she received a Bachelor of Science degree in microbiology in 1974, a Master of Arts in education in 1983, and a Ph.D. in education in 1987. She worked as a lecturer at UWI from 1980 to 1996. From 1995 to 2010, she served as regional coordinator of the university's Institute for Gender and Development Studies. In 2003, Bailey was named Professor of Gender & Education at UWI.

Bailey became inadvertently involved in the international women's movement in the 1980s, when she was invited to head the National Executive of Methodist Women in Jamaica. Through her work there and as founding member and later president of the Women in the Methodist Church in the Caribbean and the Americas, she became interested in ways to empower women through social outreach programs.

In 1985, Bailey was part of the Jamaican delegation to the Third World Conference on Women in Nairobi, Kenya. She was also part of her country's delegation in 1995 for the Fourth World Conference on Women in Beijing. In 2000, she participated in the follow-up meeting, "Beijing + 5," which was held at the UN General Assembly in New York City.

Bailey served as chair of the National Gender Advisory Committee for Jamaica, working to develop policy that would promote gender equality and social justice within the country.

The states parties elected Bailey as a member of the CEDAW Committee to serve from January 2009 through the end of 2012. This committee monitors countries' compliance with the CEDAW Convention, which provides a series of articles aiming to end discrimination against women. In a 2015 interview, Bailey recognized the complexities of reaching women's equality, naming "entrenched patriarchal ideology" as the primary factor in structural and ideological inequality.

== Recognition ==
In 2008, Bailey was awarded the CARICOM (Caribbean Community) Triennial Award for Women.
