= St Hugh's High School =

Location
- 1 Leinster Rd; Kingston; Jamaica
- 17°59′27″N 76°47′02″W

Information
- Other name: St Hugh's High School for Girls
- Type: Public school (government funded)
- Motto: Fidelitas (Loyalty and faithfulness)
- Religious affiliation: Anglican
- Patron saint: St Hugh of Lincoln
- Established: 1899; 127 years ago
- School code: 02063
- Principal: Andrea Bryan-Hughes
- Years offered: 7–13
- Gender: all-girls
- Age range: 11 to 19
- Enrolment: 1,375 (2018)
- Student to teacher ratio: 19:1
- Language: English
- Houses: Nuttall; Hardie; Stopford; Carnegie; Landale; McDougal
Colours
Royal blue and gold
- Sports: Track and field, Volleyball, Badminton, Table Tennis, Swimming, Netball, Basketball, Lacrosse, Field hockey, Cheerleading
- Emblem: Swan
- Website: www.sthughshigh.org

St Hugh's High School (also known as St Hugh's High School for Girls) is an Anglican all-girls high school in Saint Andrew, Jamaica. The school was established in 1899.

== History ==
=== 1899–1928 ===
Archbishop Enos Nuttall is considered to be the founding father of St. Hugh's High School. Nuttall was the first Anglican Archbishop of the West Indies between 1880 and 1916. In 1890, the Anglican Deaconess Order was established in Jamaica. The Deaconesses were involved in education and in 1897 the Cathedral High School for Girls was founded in Spanish Town. This became the parent school of subsequent Deaconess and diocesan schools. The most noteworthy of these schools (apart from Cathedral High School which in 1954 merged with Beckford and Smith's to form St Jago High School) were St Hilda's High School and St Hugh's High Schools. In 1899, with the encouragement of Archbishop Nuttall, Sister Madeline Thomas, head of the teaching branch of the Deaconess Order, established the Deaconess Home School for young women on Hanover Street. In 1925, the Deaconess Home School and the Deaconess Home High School for girls (founded 1913) amalgamated to become the Deaconess High School, starting with 90 students. In 1926, the Jamaica Schools Commission recommended that the school's name be changed. The name selected was St Hugh's High School. St Hugh's College, Oxford, England, was the alma mater of Miss Evelyn Stopford who became principal in 1926.

=== 1928–1962 ===
The name change to St Hugh's High School took place in 1928 and St Hugh of Lincoln was chosen as the school's patron saint. The school's colours of blue and gold were chosen as well as the swan as the emblem and fidelitas as the motto. Miss Barbara Ormsby a member of staff, wrote the words of the school song and Miss Mavis Binns, another member of staff, wrote the tune. As the school expanded its curriculum, the Hanover Street location became inadequate. In 1939, 1 Leinster Road was purchased as the new location for the school. In 1938, the school was divided into houses to foster friendly competition and discipline. The houses were Nelson (named for Admiral Horatio Nelson), Nuttall (named for Enos Nuttall) and York (named for the Duke and Duchess of York). In 1939, the school acquired a property in the Cross Roads area. Bishop William Hardie was instrumental in procuring the land as a permanent home for St Hugh's High School. The school moved to its new location at 1 Leinster Road and opened for classes in January 1940. It also had a new principal, Miss Rita Gunter (later Landale). There were 145 high school students enrolled at the time. In 1948, a new block of buildings was formally opened, housing a library, an art room and science laboratory, and additional classrooms were added in 1949. In the 1960s the number of houses increased to four with the addition of Hardie house, in recognition of Bishop Hardie's contribution to the school's relocation to Leinster Road. By 1960, the School had almost 600 students enrolled. A new physics laboratory was added to the existing biology and chemistry laboratories. A Commercial Department was opened in 1965 and in the late 1960s a modern language laboratory was built, along with a swimming pool.

=== 1962–present ===
In 1962, after 22 years as principal, Mrs Landale retired and Mrs Inez Carnegie, who was the vice-principal, was appointed the new principal. Under her management, the school continued to expand. A Development Fund campaign, chaired by Mr Aaron Matalon, was launched in April 1967, with the aim of raising £100,000 over three years. The proceeds went towards building the Home Economics block, the gymnasium and the canteen. In 1969, the St Hugh's Extension School was established to help address the demand for additional secondary school spaces. This was absorbed in 1978 when the government introduced the two-shift system in schools. The school's boarding facility was closed in 1969. The building was transformed into part of the school compound, called "The Annex". The Annex housed the art and business departments, additional classrooms and a small canteen. Over the period of the 1970s and into the 1980s, the school continued to expand by increasing its land space. The school acquired the Aub house and also secured permission to use a portion of the Caenwood property for a playing field. The property at 7 Leinster Road was also acquired in 1976. Following Mrs Carnegie's resignation in 1979, Miss Marjorie Thomas became principal. She was succeeded in 1987 by Mrs Marcia Stewart, a past student of the school, followed by Miss Daphne Morrison who acted as principal until the appointment of Mrs Yvette Smith in 1996.

== House system ==
Upon initial enrollment in the school, each student is assigned to one of six houses. In 1938 the school was originally divided into three houses. The houses were Nelson (named for Admiral Horatio Nelson), Nuttall (named for Enos Nuttall) and York (named for the Duke and Duchess of York). In the 1960s, a new house, Hardie (named after Bishop William Hardie), was added for a total of four. Nelson house was later renamed Stopford (in honour of Evelyn Stopford, the first headmistress), and York was changed to McDougal. Two new houses were added in subsequent years: Landale (in honour of the third headmistress Rita Landale), and Carnegie (in honour of the fourth headmistress Inez Carnegie).

== Enrollment ==
The school's official capacity is 1,720 students. As of the 2018–2019 academic year, there were 1,375 students enrolled with a staff complement of seventy-eight (78) teachers, including two guidance counselors and a school nurse.

School Profile
School Year	Enrollment	Student-Teacher Ratio
2018–2019	1,375	19:1
2017–2018	1,372	20:1
2016–2017	1,378	21:1
2015–2016	1,396	20:1
2014–2015	1,413	20:1
2013–2014	1,452	22:1
2012–2013	1,455	18:1

== Headmistresses and principals ==
- Miss Evelyn Stopford (1926–1931)
- Miss Wilhelmina Joels (1931–1940)
- Mrs Rita Landale (1940–1962)
- Mrs Inez Carnegie (1962–1979)
- Miss Marjorie Thomas (1979–1987)
- Mrs Marcia Stewart (1987–1994)
- Miss Daphne Morrison (Acting, 1994–1996)
- Mrs Yvette Smith (1996–2009)
- Dr Elaine Cunningham (2009–2019)
- Mrs Keisha Jones-Spooner (Acting, 2019–2020)
- Mrs. Andrea Bryan Hughes(2021–Present)

== Notable alumnae ==
- Ena Collymore-Woodstock, Jamaican barrister and magistrate
- Carolyn Cooper, Jamaican author and literary scholar
- Fae Ellington, Jamaican media personality
- Renatha Francis, Circuit Judge in Palm Beach County, Florida
- Sasher-Gaye Henry, Jamaican netball player and coach
- Lorna Goodison, Jamaican poet
- Paula Llewellyn, Jamaican lawyer, Director of Public Prosecutions since 2008
- Rosemary Moodie, Canadian neonatal physician
- Mercedes Richards, Jamaican astronomer and astrophysicist
- Cynthia Thompson, Jamaican sprinter and olympian
