= Gordon Shirley =

Jamaican academic and diplomat

Gordon Shirley OJ (born 16 October 1956) is a Jamaican academic and diplomat who served as Jamaican ambassador to the United States. He was a Pro Vice Chancellor and Principal of the University of the West Indies (UWI) and Executive Chairman of the Jamaica Public Service Limited.

== Education ==
Shirley holds a Bachelor of Engineering from Saint Augustine University and a Master of Business Administration in Operations and Finance, as well as a doctorate in Business Administration from Harvard University.

== Career ==
Shirley served as Jamaican ambassador to the United States and permanent representative to the Organization of American States from 2004 to 2007. In 2007, he was appointed pro vice chancellor and principal of the University of the West Indies (UWI) serving until 2013, when he became Chairman of the PAJ Board of Directors.
