= Derick Latibeaudiere =

The Honourable Derick Latibeaudiere OJ

Governor of the Bank of Jamaica
- In office 1 April 1996 – 30 October 2009
- Prime Minister: P. J. Patterson; Portia Simpson-Miller; Bruce Golding
- Preceded by: Jacques Bussières
- Succeeded by: Brian Wynter

Personal details
- Born: Derick Milton Latibeaudiere; 9 June 1951 (age 75) Colony of Jamaica
- Education: University of the West Indies; Jamaica College

Derick Milton Latibeaudiere ON (/ˌlætɪbiːˈoʊdiˌɛər/ lat-i-bee-OH-dee-air; born 9 June 1951) is the former governor of Jamaica's central bank, the Bank of Jamaica (BOJ) from 1996 to 2009. He took office as governor of the bank on 1 April 1996 and was the first member of the Bank' s staff to have been appointed to this position. Latibeaudiere also served as Chairman of the Board of Governors of the Bank of Jamaica and is Jamaica's Alternate Governor to the International Monetary Fund (IMF). He resigned as governor on 30 October 2009.

== Personal Loan Scandal ==
In August 2008 information surfaced that Governor Latibeaudiere borrowed 51 million Jamaican dollars from the central bank to construct a house and furnish and landscape the grounds. The scandal began when it was brought to light that there was no evidence that the loan had been properly collateralised.

== Involvement outside the Bank of Jamaica ==
Latibeaudiere also serves as Chairman of the Board of Directors of the Sugar Company of Jamaica (SCJ) and its subsidiary companies. He is a member of the Board of the Jamaica Deposit Insurance Corporation (JDIC) and was appointed Special Advisor on Racing to Jamaica's Minister of Finance and Planning. Latibeaudiere also served as director of the country's national airline, Air Jamaica.

== See also ==
- Bank of Jamaica
- Jamaican dollar
