= M. H. Ahmad =

Indian biotechnologist (born 1946)

M. H. Ahmad CD
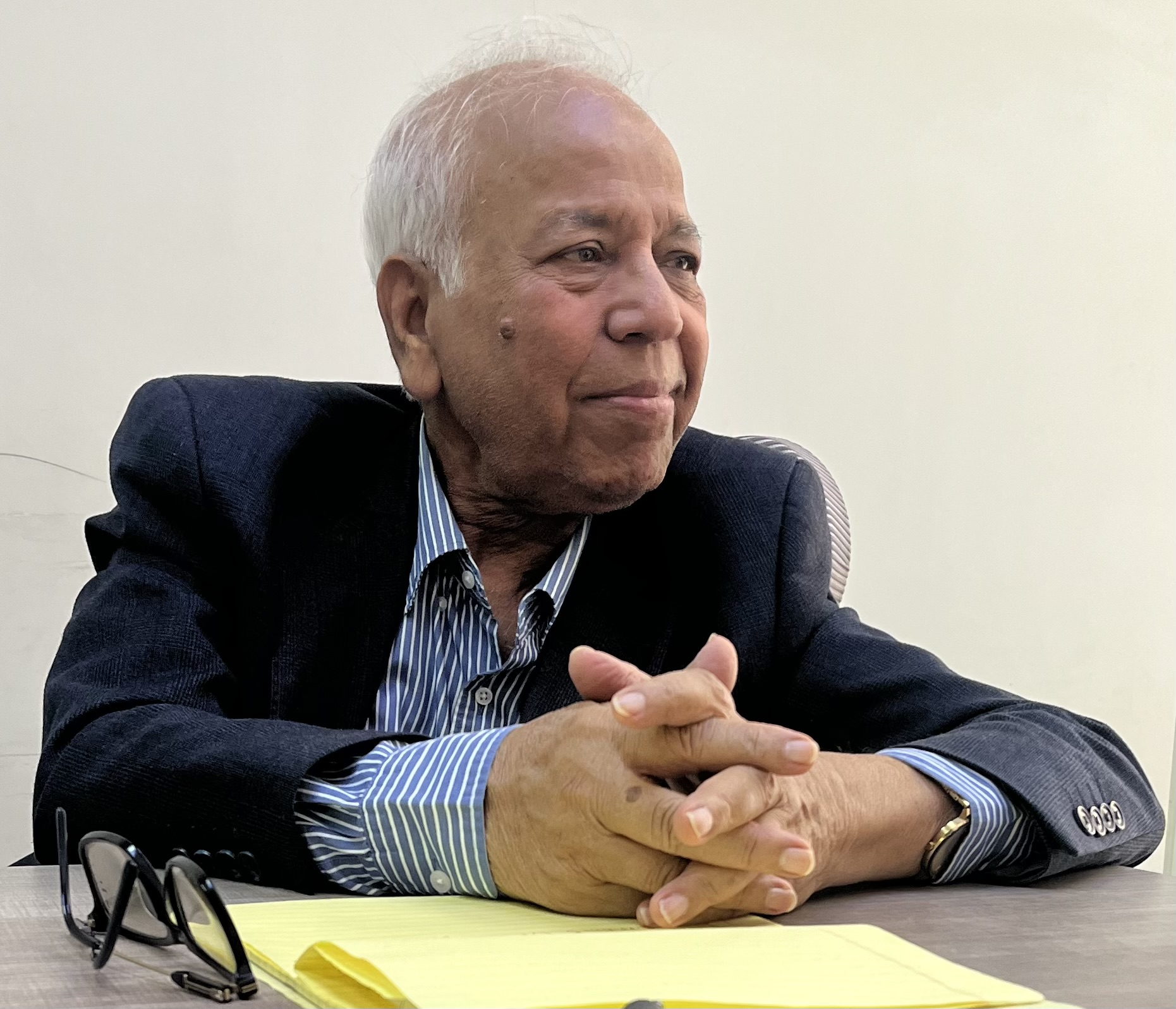
- Ahmad in 2025
- Born: 9 January 1946 (age 80); Colgong, Bihar Province, British India (present-day Kahalgaon, Bihar, India)
- Citizenship: British subject (until 1947); India (after 1947)
- Education: Bihar Agricultural University; Indian Agricultural Research Institute; Cornell University; Harvard University
- Awards: Order of Distinction in the rank of Commander (2024)
- Scientific career
- Fields: Molecular biology Agricultural biotechnology Medicinal plants Genetic engineering
- Workplaces: All India Institute of Medical Sciences; University of Delhi; University of Regensburg; University of the West Indies

Director of the Biotechnology Centre at the University of the West Indies, Mona
- In office 16 June 1990 – 30 September 2011
- Preceded by: Office established
- Succeeded by: Marcia Roye

Mohammad Hussain Ahmad CD (born 9 January 1946), usually cited as M. H. Ahmad, is an Indian scientist and professor emeritus of biotechnology at the University of the West Indies where he served as the founding director of the institute's Biotechnology Centre from 1990 until his retirement in 2011. His research focused on medicinal plants, molecular biology as well as genetic engineering and was conferred with the Order of Distinction in 2024 for his role in enhancing agricultural production in the Caribbean. He is also a former science advisor to Jamaican prime minister P. J. Patterson and a former board member of the National Commission on Science and Technology.

== Early life and career ==
Ahmad was born to a Shaikh family on January 9, 1946, in Colgong (present-day Kahalgaon) in the Bhagalpur district of Bihar Province, British India. He received his basic education in Bhagalpur, where he also attended Bihar Agricultural University and graduated in 1966 with a bachelor's degree in science. He later pursued his post-graduation and PhD from the Indian Agricultural Research Institute in Delhi in 1974.

Following a brief stint at Delhi University, Ahmad was appointed as a research scientist at the University of Regensburg in 1977 and later as a postdoctoral research associate at Cornell University in 1980. In 1982, he joined the University of the West Indies as a reader before being promoted to senior lecturer in 1983. He established the Biotechnology Centre, a research unit within the Faculty of Science and Technology at the Mona campus of the university through grants from European communities and served as its first director from June 1990 until his retirement in September 2011.

During his period in office, Ahmad implemented a regional plan for research, education, and training in plant, animal and fermentation biotechnology alongside aiming to collaborate with Jamaica's private sector to support the application of biotechnology in industry, agriculture and healthcare.

Ahmad also served as a board member of Jamaica's National Commission on Science and Technology.

In 1997, he gave a seminar on biotechnology at Nottingham Trent University. He took part in a workshop in biotechnology and bioengineering at the Barbados campus of the University of the West Indies in 1999. In 2002, he led the pathology component of the Citrus Replanting Project of Ministry of Agriculture and Fisheries, which was completed in 2007. In November 2005, he received the German ambassador to Jamaica Volker Schlegel at the Biotechnology Centre. In 2008, he delivered a guest lecture at the Visva-Bharati University.

Ahmad retired in September 2011 and was succeeded by Marcia Roye as the acting director of the Biotechnology Centre.

He has also served as an advisor to Jamaican prime minister P. J. Patterson.

He was appointed as professor emeritus in February 2012 by the Finance and General Purposes Committee of the University of the West Indies.

In 2023, the Biotechnology Centre ceased to exist when it was merged with the Natural Products Institute in order to create the Caribbean Centre for Research in Bioscience.

He received the High Commissioner of India to Jamaica Masakui Rungsung at his residence in Kingston in June 2024. In October 2024, following the 62nd Jamaican Independence Day, he was conferred with the Order of Distinction in the rank of Commander for his contribution in Jamaica to the field of agricultural sciences and genetic engineering.

== Recognition ==
- 2024 – Order of Distinction, Commander Class

== Selected publications ==
=== Articles ===
- Millar, M. K. J., S. M. Mitchell, M. H. Ahmad and K. G. Golden. (2003) Azadirachtin levels of commercial Neem oils and neem seed grown in Jamaica. In: Proceedings of the Sixth Conference of the Faculty of Pure and Applied Sciences, Mona, Jamaica.
- Mitchell, S.A. and Ahmad, M.H. 2006a. A Review of Medicinal Plant Research at the University of the West Indies, Jamaica, 1948–2001. West Indies Medical Journal.
- Mitchell S.A. and M. H. Ahmad (2006) Protecting our medicinal plant heritage: the making of a new national treasure. Jamaica Journal, Institute of Jamaica, Kingston.
- Mitchell, S. A., and M. H. Ahmad. "Medicinal Plant Biotechnology Research in Jamaica-Challenges and Opportunities." International Symposium on Medicinal and Nutraceutical Plants 756. 2007.
- Mitchell, Sylvia A., et al. "A journey through the Medicinal Plant Industry of the Caribbean highlighting Mona's Contribution." Caribbean Quarterly 54.3 (2008): 27–51.
- Abdel‐Tawwab, Mohsen, and Mohammad H. Ahmad. "Live Spirulina (Arthrospira platensis) as a growth and immunity promoter for Nile tilapia, Oreochromis niloticus (L.), challenged with pathogenic Aeromonas hydrophila." Aquaculture Research 40.9 (2009): 1037–1046.
