= Richard Bernal =

Jamaican economist and diplomat (died 2022)

Richard L. Bernal OJ
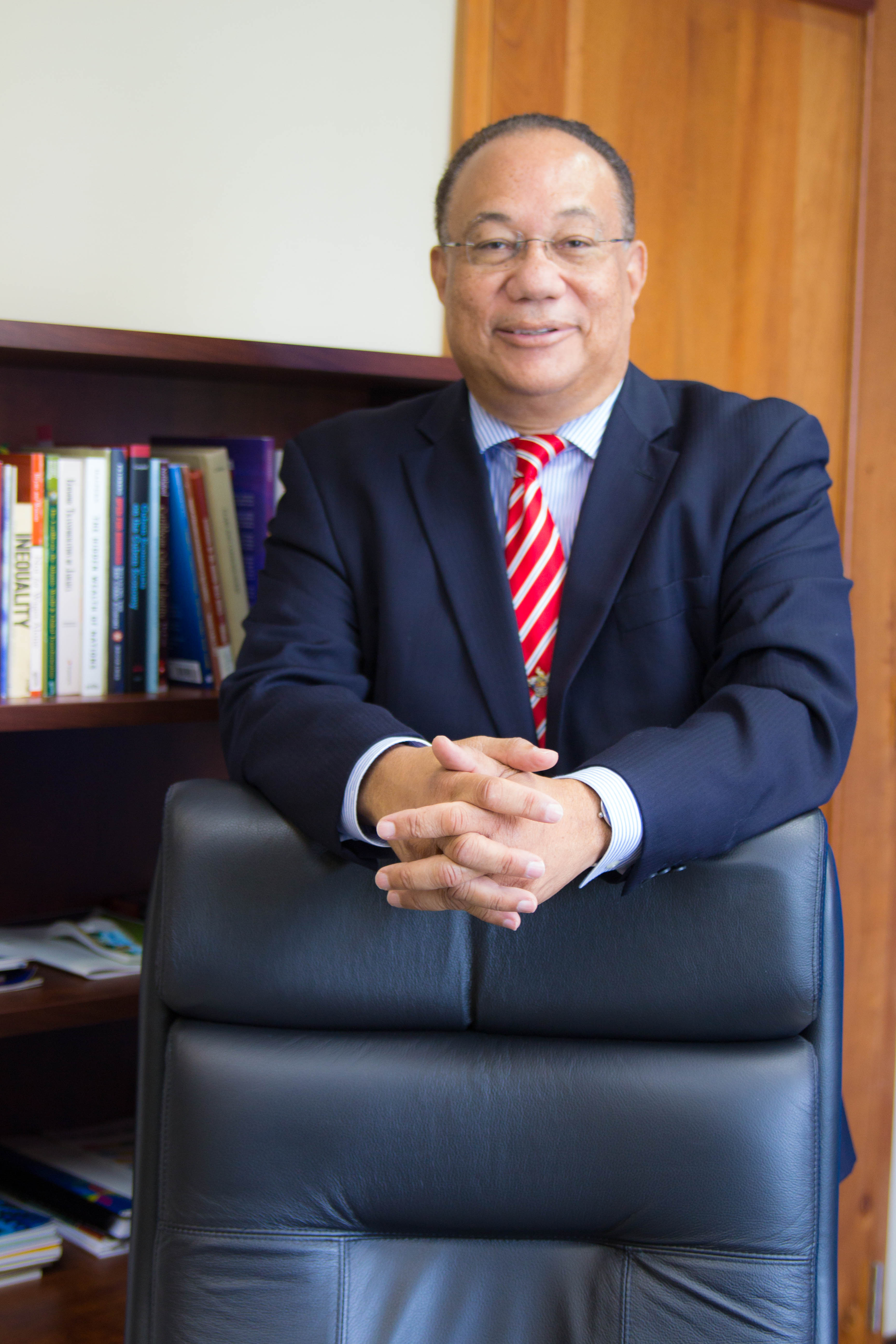
- Born: 30 November 1949; Kingston, Jamaica
- Died: 4 January 2023 (aged 73); Kingston, Jamaica

Academic background
- Education: University of the West Indies, University of Pennsylvania, New School for Social Research, Paul H. Nitze School of Advanced International Studies

Academic work
- Notable ideas: Globalization, Trade and Economic Development, Dragon in the Caribbean. China’s Global Re-Positioning

Richard L. Bernal, OJ (30 November 1949 – 4 January 2023) was a Jamaican economist and diplomat. Bernal served as the Jamaican Ambassador to the United States from 1991 to 2001, simultaneously holding the post of Permanent Representative of Jamaica to the Organization of American States. As of March 2016, Bernal held the post of Pro Vice-Chancellor for Global Affairs at the University of the West Indies (UWI). Bernal was a Member of the Order of Jamaica. In 2018, he was made a professor of Practice (PoP) in international economic policy at The UWI. Bernal was a Member of the Leadership Council of the United Nations Sustainable Development Solutions Network. He was also a member of the board of directors at Laspau, Harvard University.

== Education ==
Bernal studied at the University of the West Indies (UWI) and, in the United States, at the University of Pennsylvania, The New School for Social Research (NSSR) in New York, and the School of Advanced International Studies at Johns Hopkins University in Baltimore, Maryland. His degrees included a Bachelor of Science (B.Sc.), a Master of Arts (M.A.), a Doctor of Philosophy (Ph.D.) and a Master of International Public Policy (M.I.P.P.).

== Career ==
Prior to his diplomatic career, Bernal taught economics at UWI for seven years, served as CEO of a commercial bank, and worked as an economic advisor to the government of Jamaica.

Between 6 May 1991 and 31 August 2001, Bernal served as Jamaica's Ambassador to the United States of America and Permanent Representative to the Organization of American States (OAS).

After leaving the diplomatic corps in 2001, he continued to serve as a trade advisor and negotiator for various Jamaican and Caribbean regional trade organizations.

Bernal served as Director-General of the Caribbean Regional Negotiating Machinery (RNM) for eight years where he was responsible for trade negotiations for the Caribbean Community (CARICOM), Cuba and the Dominican Republic. As Principal Negotiator for the Forum of Caribbean States (CARIFORUM), Bernal participated in the negotiation of the CARIFORUM-European Union Economic Partnership Agreement, and also served as CARICOM’s lead negotiator and spokesperson in the World Trade Organization (WTO) and the Free Trade Area of the Americas (FTAA) negotiations.

Between 2008 and 2016, Bernal served as a Member of the Board of the Inter-American Development Bank.

In 2015, he served as a member of the World Bank’s External Advisory Panel for Diversity and Inclusion.

Bernal was a Senior Associate (Non-Resident) of the Center for Strategic and International Studies and published opinion editorials in publications such as the Miami Herald. He was also quoted by news outlets such as Canadian Broadcasting Corporation.

== Publications ==
Bernal published five books and over 100 articles on topics related to international economics and trade.

=== Books ===
- Globalisation, Trade and Economic Development. A Study of the CARIFORM-EU Economic Partnership Agreement (New York: Palgrave Macmillan, 2013; ISBN 9781137374974)
- The Influence of Small States on Superpowers: Jamaica and US Foreign Policy (Lanham: Lexington Publishers, July 2015; ISBN 9781498508179)
- Dragon in the Caribbean: China's Global Re-Dimensioning - Challenges and Opportunities for the Caribbean (Ian Randle Publishers; First edition (3 April 2014); ISBN 9789766377519)
- Medical Tourism in the Jamaica. The Potential of Jamaica (with Henry Lowe) (Kingston: Ian Randle Publishers, June 2019; ISBN 9789766379858)
- Corporate versus National Interest in US Trade Policy: Chiquita and Caribbean Bananas (New York: Palgrave Macmillan, November 2020; ISBN 978-3-030-56950-1)
