= FAE =

Fae or FAE may refer to:

== Arts, entertainment, and media ==
- F-A-E Sonata, a composition by Robert Schumann, Johannes Brahms, and Albert Dietrich
- FAE grp, a British entertainment company
- Fairy, or fae folk, a type of mythical being
- Fae folk, non-human beings in the television series Carnival Row
- Fate Accelerated Edition, a version of the Fate generic role-playing game system

== People ==
- Fae Ellington (born 1953), Jamaican media personality
- Baby Fae (1984–1984), American xenotransplant recipient
- Emerse Faé (born 1984), French-born Ivorian footballer

== Places ==
- Vágar Airport (IATA airport code FAE), Faroe Islands

== Science and technology ==
- Facial age estimation
- Fatty acid ester
- Fetal alcohol effects
- Fuel–air explosive

== Other uses ==
- Field application engineer
- French Antarctic Expedition
- Fuerza Aérea Ecuatoriana, the Ecuadorian Air Force
- Fund for Adult Education
- Fundamental attribution error, in social psychology
- Spanish Air Force, Fuerza Aérea Española
- Fellow of The Academy of Experts (post-nominal)

== See also ==
- Genderfae, a gender identity
- Fay (disambiguation)
