= Arthur Henry Winnington Williams =

Jamaican politician

Arthur Henry Winnington Williams, Sr. OD (August 17, 1913 – June 15, 2012) was a Jamaican parliamentarian.

He was born in Santa Cruz, a town in Jamaica's Saint Elizabeth Parish and graduated from Mico Teachers’ College in 1934. He taught for several years and then worked as a political organiser for the Farmers' Party in the 1950s before returning to teaching.

In 1967, Williams was elected to the Parliament of Jamaica as an MP for the Jamaica Labour Party and represented South Manchester almost continuously until 1983. He served at various times as Deputy Speaker of the House of Representatives, Parliamentary Secretary in the Ministry of Education, and acting Minister of Education.

In 2000, he was awarded the Order of Distinction by the Government of Jamaica.

His son, Arthur Henry Winnington Williams, Jr., sits in the Jamaican Senate.
