= Ian Boyne =

Jamaican journalist (born 1957)

Ian Boyne CD

Deputy CEO of the Jamaica Information Service
- In office 2010–2017

Personal details
- Born: Ian Anthony Boyne; March 13, 1957 Kingston, Jamaica
- Died: December 18, 2017 (aged 60) University Hospital of the West Indies, Saint Andrew, Jamaica
- Education: Pembroke Hall High School (dropped out)
- Occupation: Journalist, author, talk show host
- Awards: Order of Distinction (2009)
- Writing career
- Period: 1957–2017
- Notable works: Profile of Excellence: Strategies for Extraordinary Achievement from 25 Years of Interviewing Remarkable People (2013)

Ian Anthony Boyne (March 13, 1957 – December 18, 2017) was a Jamaican journalist and author. He is best known for hosting and producing television programs Profile and Religious Hard Talk.

== Biography ==
Born in Kingston, Jamaica in 1957, Boyne started his career when he was 18 years old in 1975. During that time, he dropped out of high school to take care of his siblings. Boyne was best known for hosting and producing the long-running television programs Profile, a weekly interview show featuring inspirational stories of successful individuals, and Religious Hard Talk, a forum for passionate interfaith discussions. Profile ran for 30 years. He authored the books Profile of Excellence and Ideas Matter. He also went on to what was then the Agency for Public Information. He also served as press secretary and speechwriter for Minister of Industry and Commerce under Douglas Vaz in the 1980s.

Boyne served as Chief State Liaison under Prime Minister Holness, as well as former Prime Ministers Bruce Golding and Portia Simpson-Miller.

He is married to Margaret and they have 3 children.

In 2009, the Government of Jamaica recognized his contribution to journalism with the nation's fifth highest honour, the Order of Distinction in the rank of Commander.

Ian Boyne died in December 17, 2017 from a heart attack. He was 60 years old.

== Works ==
- Profile of Excellence: Strategies for Extraordinary Achievement from 25 Years of Interviewing Remarkable People (2013), co-author
- Ideas Matter: Journey into the Mind of a Veteran Journalist (2014)
