= Derrick Rochester =

Jamaican politician and trade unionist

Derrick Austin Rochester, O.J. (c. 1940 – April 9, 2016) was a Jamaican politician, trade unionist, and member of the People's National Party (PNP). Rochester served as a member of the House of Representatives for South East St Elizabeth from 1972 to 1980 and a member of the Senate from 1980 to 1983. He then returned to House of Representatives as an MP from South East St Elizabeth from 1989 until his retirement in 2002. A trade unionist who focused on worker negotiations and the country's bauxite industry, Rochester also served as the President of the National Workers Union (NWU) from 1989 to 1993, as well as the NWU island supervisor from 1986 to 1983.

Rochester began his political career when he was elected to the Saint Elizabeth Parish Council in 1969, a seat he held from 1969 to 1972. He was then elected to his first tenure in the national House of Representatives from 1972, when he won the seat, which had been held by incumbent Vivian Blake, for the PNP. He held the seat from 1972 until the 1980 general election, when the opposition Jamaica Labour Party (JLP), led by Edward Seaga, came to power in a landslide victory.

Rochester held the position of parliamentary secretary in the Ministry of Labour in Parliament, overseeing worker responsibility, from 1976 to 1980. During the 1970s, Alumina Partners of Jamaica (Alpart) and the bauxite industry employed thousands of workers in Saint Elizabeth Parish. Shortly after being elected to Parliament in 1972, Rochester founded the Junction Trade Training Centre to serve as a headquarters for the bauxite workers; the centre was renamed for Rochester in April 2013. Rochester also donated land to establish the Junction Health Centre.

Rochester served as a member of the Senate of Jamaica from 1980 until 1983. He later regained his former seat in the House, representing South East St Elizabeth, from 1989 until his retirement in 2002. Rochester held the portfolio of Minister of State within the Ministry of Mining and Public Utilities from 1993 to 1997.

He was also a member of the National Executive Council of the People's National Party.

Rochester was awarded the Order of Jamaica in 2012. He died at his home in Saint Elizabeth Parish on April 9, 2016, at the age of 76.
