= Charles Kinkead =

Jamaican photojournalist

- Born: Charles Harold Austin Kinkead; 1913-10-03
- Died: 2007-06-01; Florida, United States
- Occupations: Photojournalist, journalist
- Awards: Order of Distinction; Seprod Human Interest Photograph Award (1973)

Charles Kinkead OD (3 October 1913 – 1 June 2007) was a Jamaican photojournalist and journalist, whose career spanned more than four decades.

Born Charles Harold Austin Kinkead, he worked as a news photographer for a number of Jamaican publications during his career. Among the newspapers who he worked for were The Gleaner, the Jamaica Standard, the Daily News, and the Jamaica Times, a weekly newspaper publication.

While working at the Daily News, Kinkead won the Seprod Human Interest Photograph Award in 1973. In 1978, Kinkead also won a national Jamaican award, the Order of Distinction, "for his contribution in the field of photo-journalism".

Kinkead moved to Florida in the 1980s to retire. He died of a stroke on 1 June 2007, aged 93, at a Florida hospital after becoming ill at his home in Pembroke Pines. He was survived by his wife and five children. A service of thanksgiving for his life was held on 14 June 2007 at the St James Cathedral in Spanish Town, Jamaica.
