= Radio Antilles =

Former Radio station in Montserrat

Coordinates: 16°42′30″N 62°13′00″W

- Montserrat
- Frequencies: 930 kHz (English, Spanish); 740 kHz (French); 1450 kHz (French)

Programming
- Affiliations: Deutsche Welle, Radio Canada International, Voice of America, British Broadcasting Corporation

History
- First air date: 1963
- Last air date: 1995

Technical information
- Class: LPAM (740 kHz); A (930 kHz); Unknown (1450 kHz)
- ERP: 200 kW (930 kHz)

Radio Antilles was a radio station operated by the Antilles Radio Corporation which began broadcasting in 1963. It was located on the British Caribbean island of Montserrat.

The broadcast studios were located in the capital city of Plymouth, with the transmission site at O'Garro's on the southern slopes of the Soufriere Hills volcano near Morris. Deutsche Welle became a shareholder in 1972 and added some low-power shortwave transmitters at the O'Garro's site which came into service in 1978.

Radio Antilles' transmitter site was badly damaged by Hurricane Hugo, rebuilt in 1992, and then shut down and abandoned at the start of the volcanic eruptions in 1995. Both the studio and the transmitter site were eventually burned and buried completely by lava and pyroclastic flow deposits.

== Programming ==
From the beginning, the station operated in English on 930 kHz AM and covered the entire Caribbean region. A lower-powered French service operated on 740 kHz to serve the nearby Francophone islands. In 1977, this service was later supplemented by a relay station on the island of St Vincent operating on 1450 kHz to extend coverage to the island of Martinique.

In 1968, Spanish programmes were introduced and ran until 1981 when they had to be halted for commercial reasons.

In September 1983, the English and French programmes were merged into a single, bilingual service using all three frequencies but this proved unpopular with the English-speaking audience and returned to English.

Following Deutsche Welle's involvement, a satellite downlink station enabled international broadcasters to use airtime on the 930 kHz transmitter. Radio Canada International began relays in January 1984 followed by Voice of America in 1985 and BBC World Service in 1986.

== See also ==
- Julian Rogers
