= Louis Marriott =

- Born: 22 May 1935; Saint Andrew, Colony of Jamaica, British Empire
- Died: 1 August 2016 (aged 81); Kingston, Jamaica
- Occupations: Actor, director, writer, broadcaster

Louis Marriott (22 May 1935 – 1 August 2016) was a Jamaican actor, director, writer, broadcaster, the executive officer of the Michael Manley Foundation, and member of the Performing Right Society, Jamaica Federation of Musicians, and founding member of the Jamaica Association of Dramatic Artists.

Marriott was born on the Old Pound Road, Saint Andrew, Jamaica, the son of Egbert Marriott and Edna Irene Thompson-Marriott. He was educated at Jamaica College. He died in Kingston at the age of 81 on 1 August 2016.

== Career ==
- Government public relations officer, late 1950s
- Editor, Public Opinion (Jamaican newspaper), 1960–62
- Assistant public relations officer, Ninth Central American and Caribbean Games (Kingston). 1962
- Press officer, first anniversary Jamaica Independence Festival, 1963
- Deputy editor of publications,Commonwealth Parliamentary Association (CPA) General Council (London), 1965-70. Lectured widely in Britain on Commonwealth and Caribbean affairs 1965–72. Served as a consultant-advisor for several CPA conferences in the Caribbean and West Africa, 1967–70.
- BBC radio writer and producer, 1970–71
- Director, Jamaica Independence Festival (London) 1972
- Press secretary to Prime Minister of Jamaica, 1973 and 1979–80
- Assistant director, National Literacy Programme Communications, 1973–74
- Director-general, Information Incorporated 1974–76
- Chief organizer, Food and Drink '75 Exhibition (National Arena), 1975
- Director publications and advertising, Agency for Public Information, 1976–79
- Freelance writer, 1980–2016, for various local and international publications and organisations, including CFNI, PAHO, WHO, Jamaica Gleaner. During this period, he also was a writer, director and producer of several stage productions
- Executive officer, Michael Manley Foundation, 2000–2016

== Theatre ==
Marriott wrote and directed for stage, and acted in a number a plays.

- Public Mischief (1957)
- The Shepherd (1960)
- Phineas McUmbridge (1961)
- The Baiting of Reuben (1963)
- A Pack of Jokers (1978)
- More Jokers (1980)
- The New Jokers (1981)
- Playboy (1981)
- Pressure (1982)
- Office Chase (1982)
- How to Make Money (1983)
- Singer Man (1984)
- Bedward (1984, 2004) (reprisal of The Shepherd)
- Women (1984)
- Lovey (1985)
- Over the Years (1985, 2010)
- One Stop Driver (1988) (co-written with Alvin Campbell)
- Last of the Jokers (1988) (co-written with Alvin Campbell, Lavinia Marriott and Karen Marriott)
- The Adventure of Charlie Greenhorne (1991)
- Funny Biz Niz (1992)
- Life in Jamaica (1998)
- Rosie (1999)
- The Year 2000 (2000)

Marriott wrote several books including:

- Gold Rush – Jamaican Style – Jamaica in World Athletics 1948–92 (1992) (co-written with Alvin Campbell)
- Who's Who and What's What in Jamaican Arts and Entertainment (1995)

== Journalism ==
Marriott authored syndicated articles that appeared in around 200 English-language newspapers and magazines worldwide. He was a regular contributing writer in several Jamaican newspaper publications. He wrote and produced numerous radio and television plays and documentary broadcast programmes and films in both Jamaica and Britain, including The University of Brixton radio drama series for BBC English Radio between 1970–71. He also wrote several public education radio series for the Caribbean Food and Nutrition Institute (CFNI) during his freelance years.

== Filmography ==
- Dr. No (1962) - Dragon Guard (uncredited)
