= Brian Wynter =

Jamaican banker and financial regulator (born 1959)

The Honourable Brian Wynter OJ

Governor of the Bank of Jamaica
- In office October 2009 – August 2019
- Preceded by: Derick Latibeaudiere
- Succeeded by: Richard Byles

Personal details
- Born: 1959 (age 66–67)
- Education: London School of Economics (BSc); City University London

Brian Wynter OJ (born in Jamaica, 1959) is a Jamaican banker and financial regulator, who is notable for his work with the Financial Services Commission (FSC). In October 2009, it was announced that he would assume the position as Governor of the Bank of Jamaica on 1 December 2009.

As governor, he was chairman of the bank's board of directors, and served until August 2019. Previously, he was the Deputy Governor of the Bank of Jamaica.

== Education ==
He graduated from the London School of Economics in 1981 with a BSc (economics) honours degree. He received the graduate diploma in law from The City University London. Wynter is also the holder of a master's degree specialising in international economics from the School of International and Public Affairs, Columbia University (1985).
