= WCCO =

WCCO may refer to:

- WCCO (AM), a radio station (830 AM) licensed to serve Minneapolis, Minnesota, United States
- WCCO-TV, a television station (channel 32, virtual channel 4) licensed to serve Minneapolis, Minnesota
- KMNB, a radio station (102.9 FM) licensed to serve Minneapolis, Minnesota, which used the call sign WCCO-FM from May 1969 to November 1983
