= Douglas Saunders =

Jamaican diplomat (born 1949)

Douglas Anthony Clive Saunders OJ CD (born 15 February 1949 in Kingston, Jamaica) is a Jamaican diplomat.

== Biography ==
Douglas Saunders OJ CD is the Cabinet Secretary of the Jamaican Prime Minister's cabinet. Saunders is the third officer to take over the reins of this distinguished position as head of central government and has held this post from June 2008.

He was born in Westmoreland, in rural Jamaica on 15 February 1949 and graduated from Jamaica College in 1967. He completed a Bachelor of Science degree in Management Studies at the University of the West Indies in 1972 before obtaining a Certificate of Diplomacy from Oxford University in 1975. He is also Pope Paul VI Scholar of St. John's University in New York where he obtained a master's degree in Government and Politics, majoring in International Relations in 1981.

Ambassador Saunders spent the next thirty six years in the public sector in the Ministry of Foreign Affairs & Foreign Trade in various capacities. These include as Counsellor (Economic Affairs) at the Permanent Mission to the United Nations in New York; Deputy Director of Foreign Trade; Deputy High Commissioner in London to Denmark, Finland, Norway, Sweden, Spain and Portugal; Director of European Affairs; Ambassador Extraordinary and Plenipotentiary to the Republic of Cuba, the Kingdom of Belgium, the Kingdom of the Netherlands, the Grand-Duchy of Luxembourg, the Republic of France, Ireland as well as High Commissioner to the Republic of South Africa. He subsequently took the highest post in the Ministry as Permanent Secretary in September 2002.

Saunders has received a number of awards for his outstanding contribution to the public sector. These include the Long Service Award in 1998 for 25 years of service to the Government of Jamaica in 1998; l’Ordre des Palmes Académiques (Commandeur) of France in 2002, the Order of Distinction in the rank of Commander (CD) in 2003 and the Order of Jamaica (OJ) in 2011, the nation's fourth highest honour.

== Family ==
His parents are Clive Douglas Sauders and Gloria Saunders. He is eldest of four children raised in Westmoreland Parish, Jamaica. His brother is attorney-at-law Revd. Maurice Saunders. He has four sons (Alexander, born 1979; Jason, born 1980; Christopher, born 1982; and Machel, born 1989), and is married to M. Angela Robertson, a lawyer, from Kingston. Douglas Saunders is cousin of cricketer George Alfonce Headley, Jr (1909–1983) of Jamaica.
