= Order of Distinction =

Order of Distinction may refer to:

- Order of Distinction (Bahamas)
- Order of Distinction (Belize)
- Order of Distinction (Jamaica)
- Order of Distinction (Ottoman Empire)
- Order of Distinction for Women (Sudan)
