= Danville Walker =

Jamaican politician

The Honourable Danville Walker, O.J. is a Jamaican politician, formerly Director of Elections and Commissioner of Customs, as well as a one-time candidate for the Parliament of Jamaica.

== Career ==
Walker was appointed as Director of Elections and head of the Electoral Office of Jamaica from 1997 to 2008. He also became chief executive officer of the Office of National Reconstruction in 2004, overseeing reconstruction efforts in the aftermath of Hurricane Ivan. In May 2008, he resigned from his position as Director of Elections, and took up a new job as Commissioner of Customs the following month.

In 2011, Walker announced his intention to run as the Jamaica Labour Party candidate in the Central Manchester constituency in the election late that year. He stated that he had renounced his U.S. citizenship in preparation for his candidacy, but that he still considered himself a member of the Jamaican diaspora and would strive to represent that group as an MP. He ran against incumbent Peter Bunting, the General Secretary of the People's National Party; he chose Central Manchester because he relished the challenge of taking on Bunting. In the end, he was defeated by 10,606 to 10,067 votes, with 61.58% voter turnout.

In February, after his election defeat, Walker resigned from the JLP to take a job in the private sector. His sudden resignation led to recriminations against Audley Shaw, who was responsible for recruiting him. In June 2012, he appeared in court pursuant to allegations that he had breached the Contractor General's Act during his time as Customs Director; the Director of Public Prosecutions complained that he was uncooperative with a probe into export of scrap metal in contravention of a ministerial order.

Walker was named managing director of the Jamaica Observer in March 2012, holding the position for seven years until April 2019 when he stepped down in order to pursue other interests.

== Personal life ==
Walker grew up on Bay Farm Road in Kingston, Jamaica in the 1970s. His father was a baker and a supporter of the PNP. Walker joined the Jamaica Defence Force at the age of 20. He has two sisters, Denise Walker-Lewis and Karen Walker-Coutrier. He was named a member of the Order of Jamaica in October 2008.
