= Fae Ellington =

Jamaican media personality

Fae Ellington CD OD
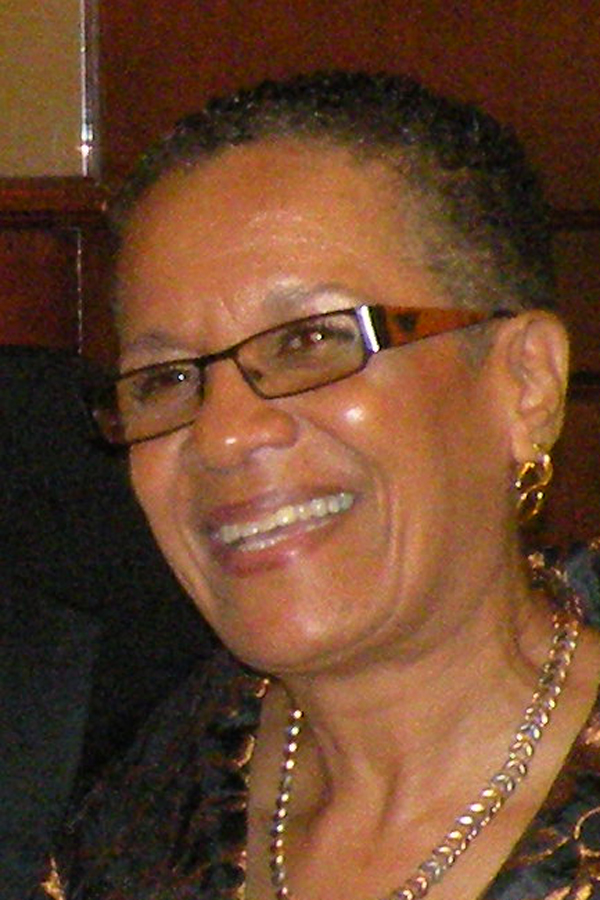
- Fae A. Ellington serving as Mistress of Ceremonies at the JAAC 25th Anniversary celebration in Los Angeles.
- Born: Fae Audrey Ellington; 28 May 1953 (age 73); Smithville District, Clarendon, Jamaica
- Education: St. Hugh's High School; University of the West Indies
- Occupations: Talk show host News presenter
- Years active: 1974–present
- Spouse: Ian Smellie
- Children: Stuart Jonathan Smellie
- Parent(s): Exford Joseph Ellington; Mary "Mae" Williams

Fae Ellington, CD, OD, is a Jamaican media personality and lecturer best known for hosting the television series Morning Time on JBC for more than twelve years.

== Background ==
Fae Audrey Ellington was born on 28 May 1950 in the district of Smithville in Clarendon Parish, Jamaica. She was the only child of Mary "Mae" Williams, and Exford Joseph Ellington, a school teacher. Her parents never married and Fae would not meet her father until she was 21 years old. In addition to growing up with the stigma of being a child of unwed parents, Ellington also had asthma and dyslexia.

== Career ==
In 1974, Ellington joined the Jamaica Broadcasting Corporation (JBC), eventually hosting Morning Ride for over a dozen years. She also served as one of the main news anchors on Jamaican radio and television for decades.

In 2005, she made her directorial debut, when she staged the one-woman show Who Will Sing for Lena.

She currently hosts the programme Profile on Television Jamaica, replacing the previous host Ian Boyne after his death.

== Awards and recognition ==
- 2015 – Order of Distinction, Commander Class
- 2005 – Best Director nomination, Actor Boy Awards for Who Will Sing for Lena
- 1998 – Order of Distinction, Officer Class
- 1992 – Distinguished Past Student of St. Hugh's High School, Kingston, Jamaica
