= Bank of Jamaica =

Central bank of Jamaica

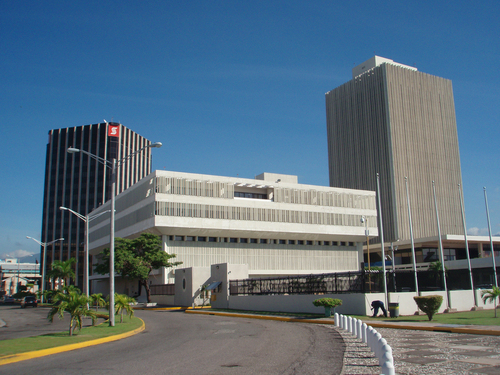
- Central bank of: Jamaica
- Headquarters: Kingston, Jamaica
- Established: May 1, 1961
- Ownership: 100% state ownership
- Governor: Richard Byles (effective August 19, 2019)
- Currency: Jamaican dollar JMD (ISO 4217)
- Reserves: 2 660 million USD
- Interest on reserves: 5.50%
- Website: www.boj.org.jm

The Bank of Jamaica (Jamaican Patois: Bangk a Jumieka) is the central bank of Jamaica located in Kingston. It was established by the Bank of Jamaica Act 1960 and was opened on May 1, 1961.

It is responsible for the monetary policy of Jamaica on the instruction of the Minister of Finance.

== History ==
The Bank of Jamaica, established by the Bank of Jamaica Law (1960), began operations in May 1961, terminating the currency board system which had been in existence from 1939, managed by the Commissioners of Currency of Jamaica. The establishment of the Central Bank was in recognition of the need for an appropriately regulated financial structure to encourage the development process, particularly as Jamaica was about to embark on the road to political independence.

The Central Bank's role tended to be of a largely reactive nature as the institution grappled with several national and international developments. However, in recent years, monetary policy implementation has been characterized by a more proactive stance, as the Central Bank has actively sought to encourage the appropriate environment for economic growth and development. As a result, the Central Bank introduced a programme for financial reform - The Financial Sector Reform Programme (FSRP) in 1985. This initiative was aimed at more effective intermediation, through the encouragement of market forces and the strengthening of the Central Bank's capacity to implement monetary policies.

In 2022, the Bank of Jamaica launched a central bank digital currency.

== Organization ==
The Bank of Jamaica is run by a Board of Directors headed by the governor of the Bank of Jamaica. The board of directors is composed of the governor, who is also chairman of the board, the senior deputy governor, the financial secretary and six other directors. All are appointed by the minister of finance for five year terms. Don Wehby, chief operating officer at GraceKennedy Limited and a former senator, has called for the separation of the positions of governor and chairman.

Governors of the Bank of Jamaica since 1960. George Arthur Brown was the first Jamaican appointed as the governor.

- Stanley Waldon Payton: June 1960 - December 1964
- Richard T. P. Hall: December 1964 - June 1967
- George Arthur Brown: July 1967 - July 1977
- Herbert Walker: November 1977 - November 1981
- Horace Barber: January 1983 - October 1985
- Headley Brown: November 1985 to March 1989
- George Arthur Brown: October 1989 - September 1992
- Roderick Rainford: October 1992 - June 1993
- Jacques Bussières: June 1993 - March 1996
- Derick Latibeaudiere: 1 April 1996 - 30 October 2009
- Brian Wynter: November 2009 - August 2019
- Richard Byles: August 2019 -

== See also ==
- Economy of Jamaica
- Jamaican dollar
- Americas Central Securities Depositories Association
- List of central banks
- List of financial supervisory authorities by country
