= Order of Distinction (Jamaica) =

National order in the Jamaican honours system

- Officer's badge of the order

Awarded by Jamaica
- Type: Order
- Motto: "Distinction Through Service"
- Eligibility: Distinguished citizens of Jamaica and other countries
- Awarded for: Outstanding and important services to Jamaica
- Status: Currently constituted
- Chancellor: Governor-General of Jamaica
- Grades: Commander (CD); Officer (OD)

Precedence
- Next (higher): Order of Jamaica
- Next (lower): Badge of Honour
- Ribbon of the order

The Order of Distinction (OD) is a national order in the Jamaican honours system. It is the sixth in order of precedence of the Orders of Societies of Honour, which were instituted by an Act of Parliament (The National Honours and Awards Act) in 1968. The motto of the Order is "Distinction Through Service".

The Order of Distinction is conferred upon citizens of Jamaica who have rendered outstanding and important services to Jamaica, or to distinguished citizens of a country other than Jamaica. The former are made Members of the Order, and the latter are made Honorary Members.

The Order has two ranks: the higher class of Commander, and the lower class of Officer. Commanders take place and precedence immediately after Members and Honorary Members of the Order of Jamaica. A Member or Honorary Member may be promoted from the rank of Officer to that of Commander.

Commanders of the Order of Distinction are entitled to use the post-nominal letters CD in the case of Members, or CD (Hon.) in the case of Honorary Members. Officers of the Order of Distinction are entitled to use the post-nominal letters OD in the case of Members, or OD (Hon.) in the case of Honorary Members.

== Officers ==
=== Art ===
- Carl Abrahams
- Gloria Escoffery
- Christopher González

=== Theatre ===
- Patrick Brown

=== Education ===
- Heather Little-White

=== Journalism ===
- Charles Kinkead
- Laura Tanna

=== Law ===
- Lloyd Stanbury

=== Medical ===
- Gwendolyn Spencer

=== Music ===
- Owen Gray
- Robert "Bobby" Ellis
- Ernest Ranglin
- David Rodigan
- Prince Buster
- Alton Ellis
- Ken Boothe
- Jah Jerry Haynes
- Carl Brady
- Lloyd Brevett
- Lennie Hibbert
- Olive Lewin
- Burning Spear
- Roland Alphonso
- Tommy McCook
- Lee "Scratch" Perry
- Phil Chen
- Gregory Isaacs
- Derrick Morgan
- Rexton Gordon "Shabba Ranks"
- Steven Woodham
- Sean Paul
- Rita Marley
- Judy Mowatt
- Chris Chin
- Yellowman
- Wayne Marshall (Wayne Mitchell)
- Bounty Killer
- King Jammy
- Sonia Pottinger
- Mighty Diamonds
- Lord Creator

=== Politics ===
- St. William Grant
- Gladstone Mills
- Arthur Henry Winnington Williams

=== Social work ===
- Hazel Monteith
- Noel Earl Alexander

=== Sport ===
- Jimmy Adams
- Gerry Alexander
- Simone Edwards
- Shelly-Ann Fraser-Pryce
- Chris Gayle
- George Headley
- Merlene Ottey
- Rovman Powell
- Stafanie Taylor
- Theodore Whitmore
- Arthur Wint
- Elaine Thompson-Herah
- Shericka Jackson

== Commanders ==
=== Biotechnology ===
- M. H. Ahmad

=== Art ===
- Gene Pearson
- Trevor Rhone

=== Journalism ===
- Ian Boyne

=== Broadcasting ===
- Newton James

=== Communication, media, education and culture ===
- Fae Ellington
- Daphne Elaine Innerarity
- Cynthia Reyes
- Madge Sinclair

=== Tourism and the Hotel Industry ===
- Adam Stewart

=== Economics ===
- George Beckford
- Brian Wynter

Entrepreneurship

- Norman Horne

=== Law ===
- Shirley Miller
- Paula Llewellyn

=== Music ===
- Coxsone Dodd
- Millie Small
- Bob Andy
- Sonny Bradshaw
- Dennis Brown
- Tommy Cowan
- Marcia Griffiths
- John Holt
- Byron Lee
- Duke Reid
- Shaggy
- Lloyd Hall
- Delroy Wilson
- Monty Alexander
- Barry Moncrieffe
- Phyllis Dillon
- Shabba Ranks

=== Politics ===
- Patrick Allen
- R. James deRoux
- Neville Eden Gallimore
- Douglas Saunders
- Ransford Smith
- Clifford Everald Warmington
- Audley Shaw
- Fenton Ferguson

=== Sport ===
- Alia Atkinson
- Usain Bolt
- Veronica Campbell-Brown
- Shelly-Ann Fraser-Pryce
- Deon Hemmings-McCatty
- Shericka Jackson
- Asafa Powell
- Donald Quarrie
- Molly Rhone
- Khadija Shaw
- Yohan Blake
- Elaine Thompson-Herah
