= Order of Jamaica =

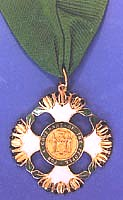
- Type: Single grade Order
- Awarded for: Outstanding distinction
- Presented by: Jamaica
- Eligibility: Jamaicans; also, foreigners may be given honorary membership
- Post-nominals: OJ
- Motto: "For a covenant of the people"
- Established: 1969
- Website: https://jis.gov.jm/information/awards/order-of-jamaica/
- Neck ribbon of the order Ribbon of the order

Precedence
- Next (higher): Order of Merit
- Next (lower): Order of Distinction

The Order of Jamaica is the fifth of the six orders in the Jamaican honours system. The Order was established in 1969, and it is considered the equivalent of a knighthood in the British honours system.

Membership in the Order can be conferred upon any Jamaican citizen of outstanding distinction. Honorary membership in the Order can be conferred upon any distinguished citizen of a country other than Jamaica.

Members and Honorary Members are entitled to:

- wear the insignia of the Order as a decoration,
- be styled "The Honourable",
- use the post-nominal letters "OJ" (for Members) or "OJ (Hon.)" (for Honorary Members).

The motto of the Order is "For a covenant of the people".

== See also ==
- List of recipients of the Order of Jamaica
