= Saint Ann's Bay =

- Town
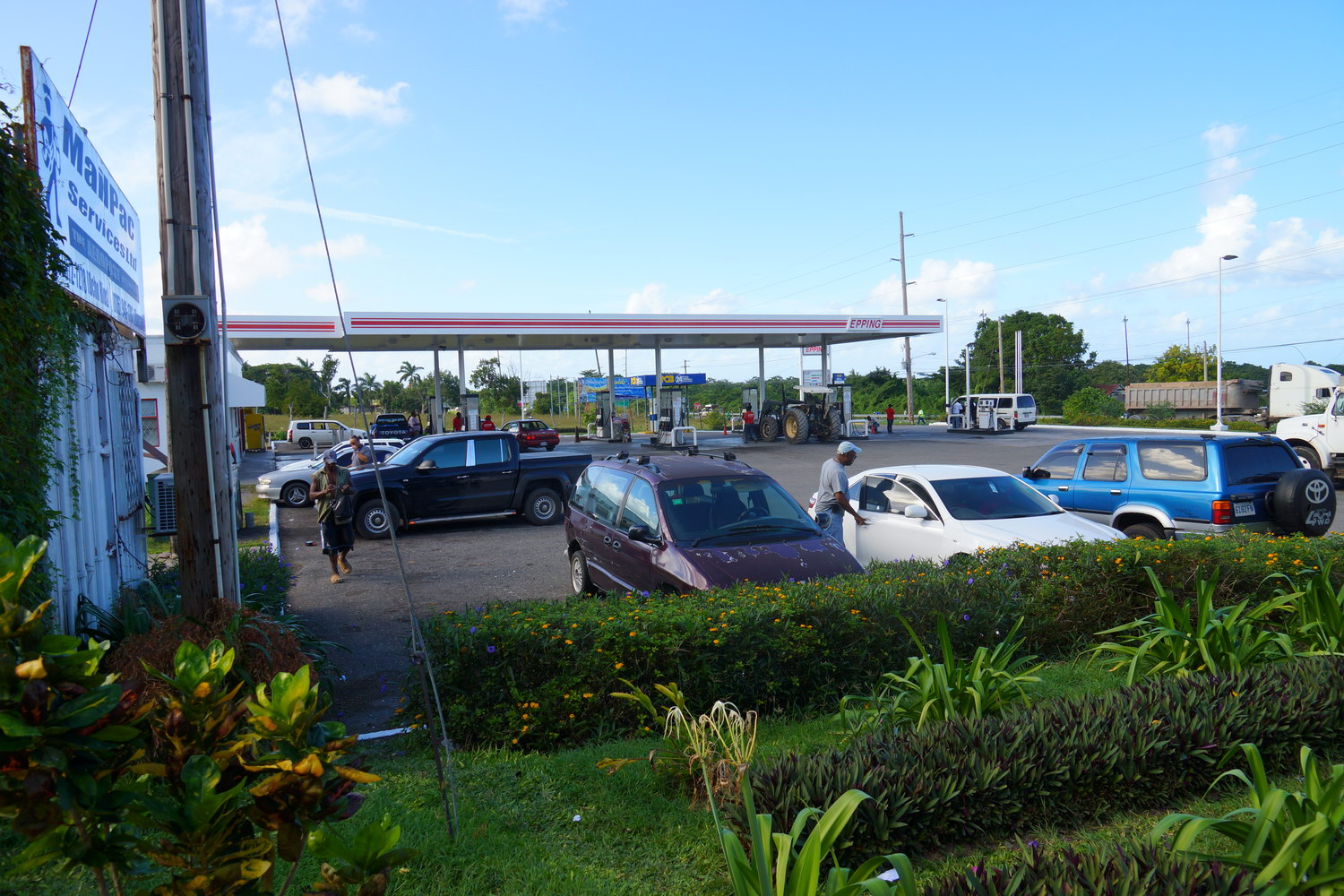

- Location within Jamaica
- Coordinates: 18.436°N 77.202°W
- Country: Jamaica
- County: Middlesex
- Parish: Saint Ann

Population (2009)
  - Total: 13,671
- Time zone: UTC-5 (EST)

Saint Ann's Bay (Jamaican Patois: Sint An’s Bay) is a settlement in Jamaica, the capital of Saint Ann Parish. It had a population of 10,961 at the 1991 census.

Musicians Floyd Lloyd and Burning Spear, and Hero of Jamaica Marcus Garvey were born in the town.

== History ==
When Christopher Columbus first came to Jamaica in 1494, he landed on the shores of St. Ann's Parish. He returned to Jamaica on his fourth voyage and was eventually marooned for one year at St. Ann's Bay (June 1503 – June 1504), which he called Santa Gloria. A statue of Christopher Columbus is located near the town’s main traffic intersection to commemorate the discovery of the bay.

The first Spanish settlement in Jamaica was also at Sevilla la Nueva, now called Seville, just to the west of Saint Ann's Bay. Established by Juan de Esquivel, the first Spanish Governor of Jamaica, St Ann's Bay became the third capital established by Spain in the Americas. The first sugar mills were established by the Spaniards in Sevilla la Nueva before 1526. Sevilla la Nueva was abandoned in favour of Santiago de la Vega due to the sanitary problems and frequent raids from French filibusters its inhabitants faced in the decades following its foundation. After 1655, when the English captured Jamaica, St Ann's Bay gradually developed as a fishing port with many warehouses and wharves. The parish of St. Ann was later named after Lady Anne Hyde the first wife of King James II of England.

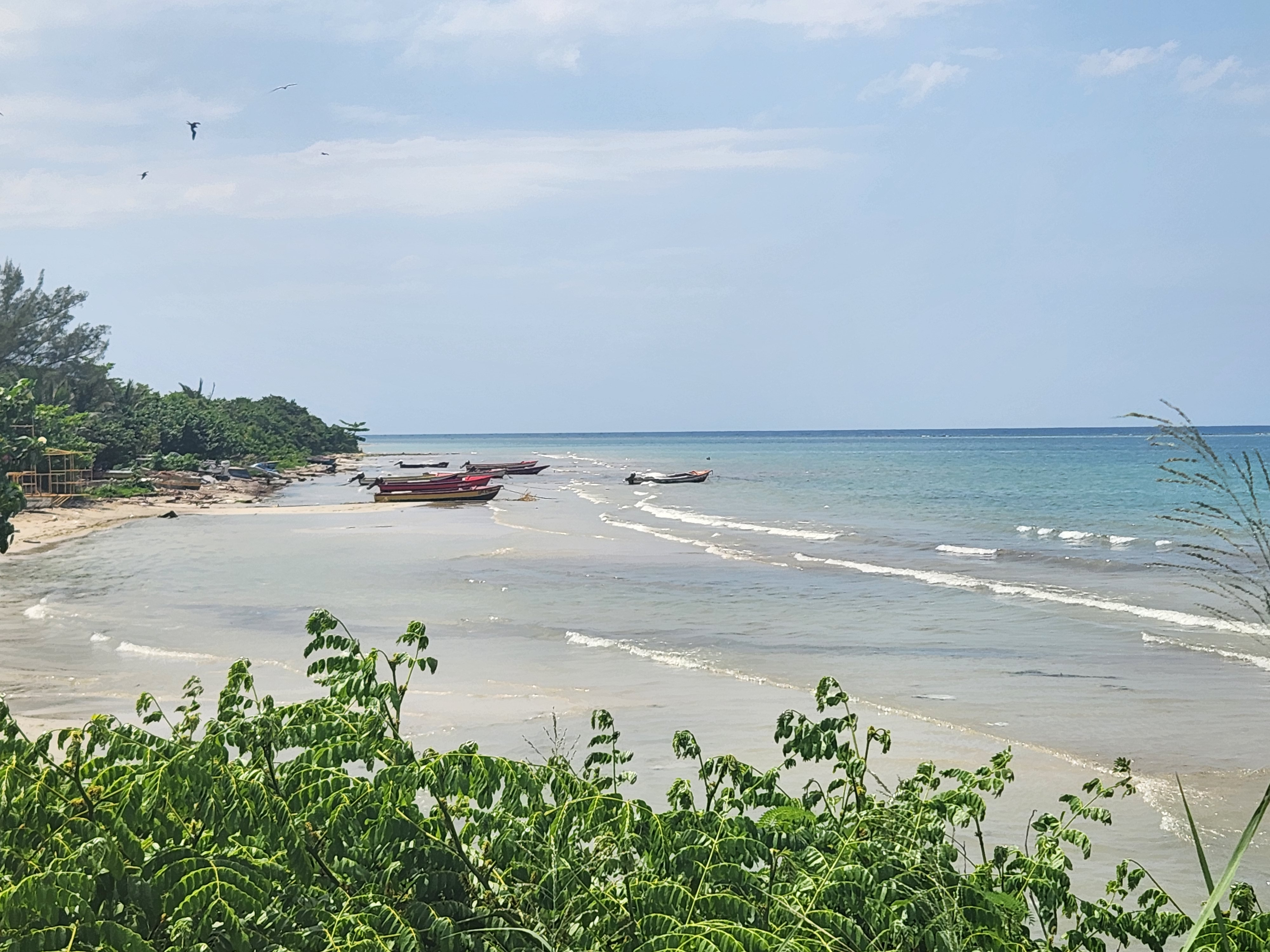
St Ann's Bay looking north

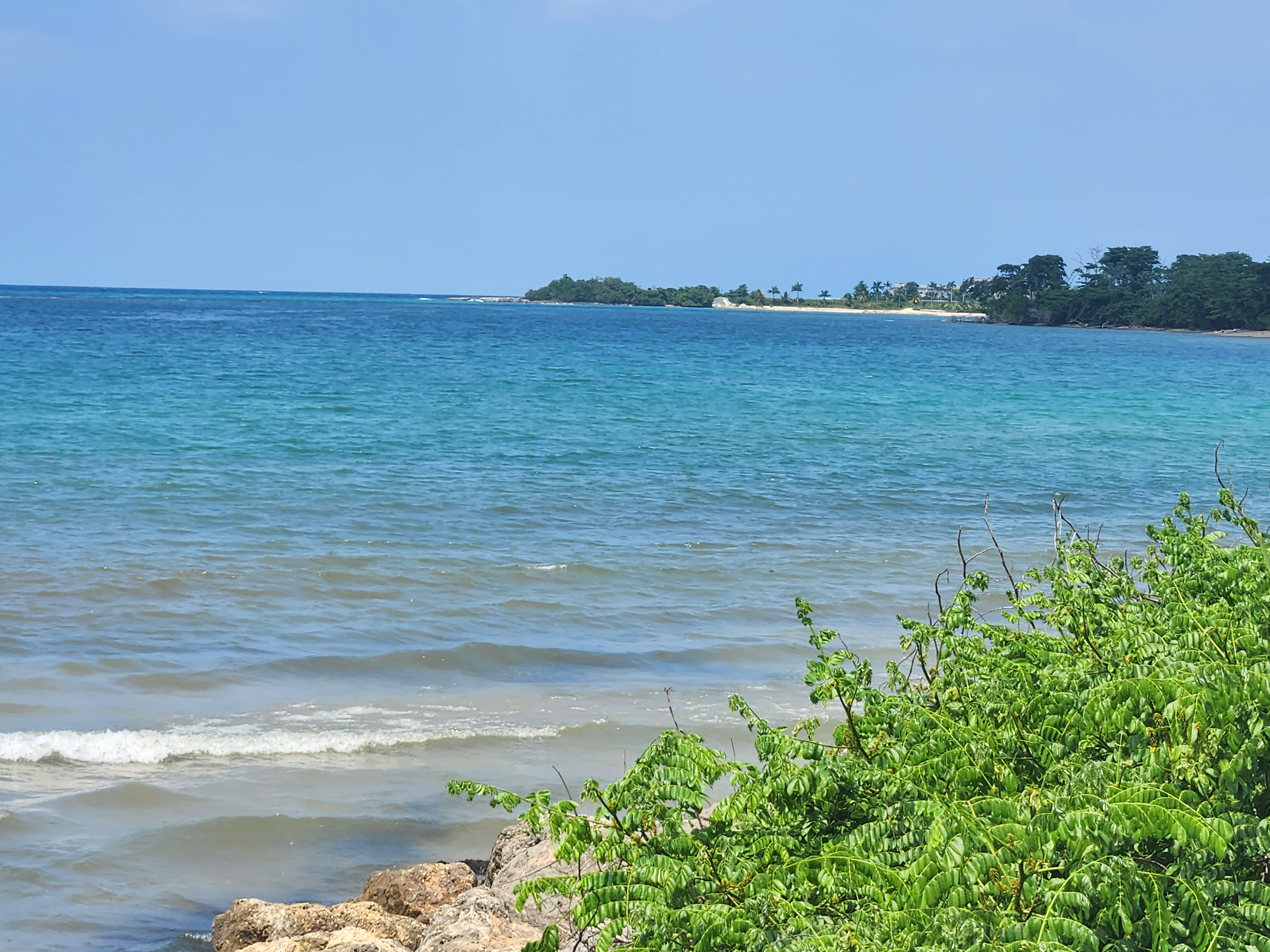
St Ann's Bay looking east

St. Ann’s Bay was named as the capital of the Parish of St. Ann, largely because of its large harbor and port for shipping goods ranging from bananas to bauxite. In later years, Ocho Rios has eclipsed St. Ann’s Bay due to its rapid growth in tourism and commerce, but St. Ann’s Bay remains a popular destination for those seeking a more traditional Jamaican experience. The town features a number of well-maintained buildings in the early 20th-century Jamaican vernacular tradition. Two of the oldest buildings in town are the St. Ann Parish Church and the St. Ann’s Bay Courthouse. The St. Ann Parish Church is located at the corner of Main St. and Church St. and was constructed in 1871. The St. Ann’s Bay Courthouse is located nearby and was constructed in 1860.

St. Ann’s Bay is also home to Jamaica’s first prison, and is a reflection of the town’s early importance and position of authority. The Old Jail in St Ann's Bay was originally built as a fort in 1750 and was converted to a jail in 1795.

One of Jamaica’s most famous citizens, Marcus Garvey, was born in St. Ann’s Bay in 1887, and spent his childhood and early youth in the locality before moving to Kingston in 1903. A statue was erected in his honour in front of St. Ann’s Bay Library.

== Historic sites ==
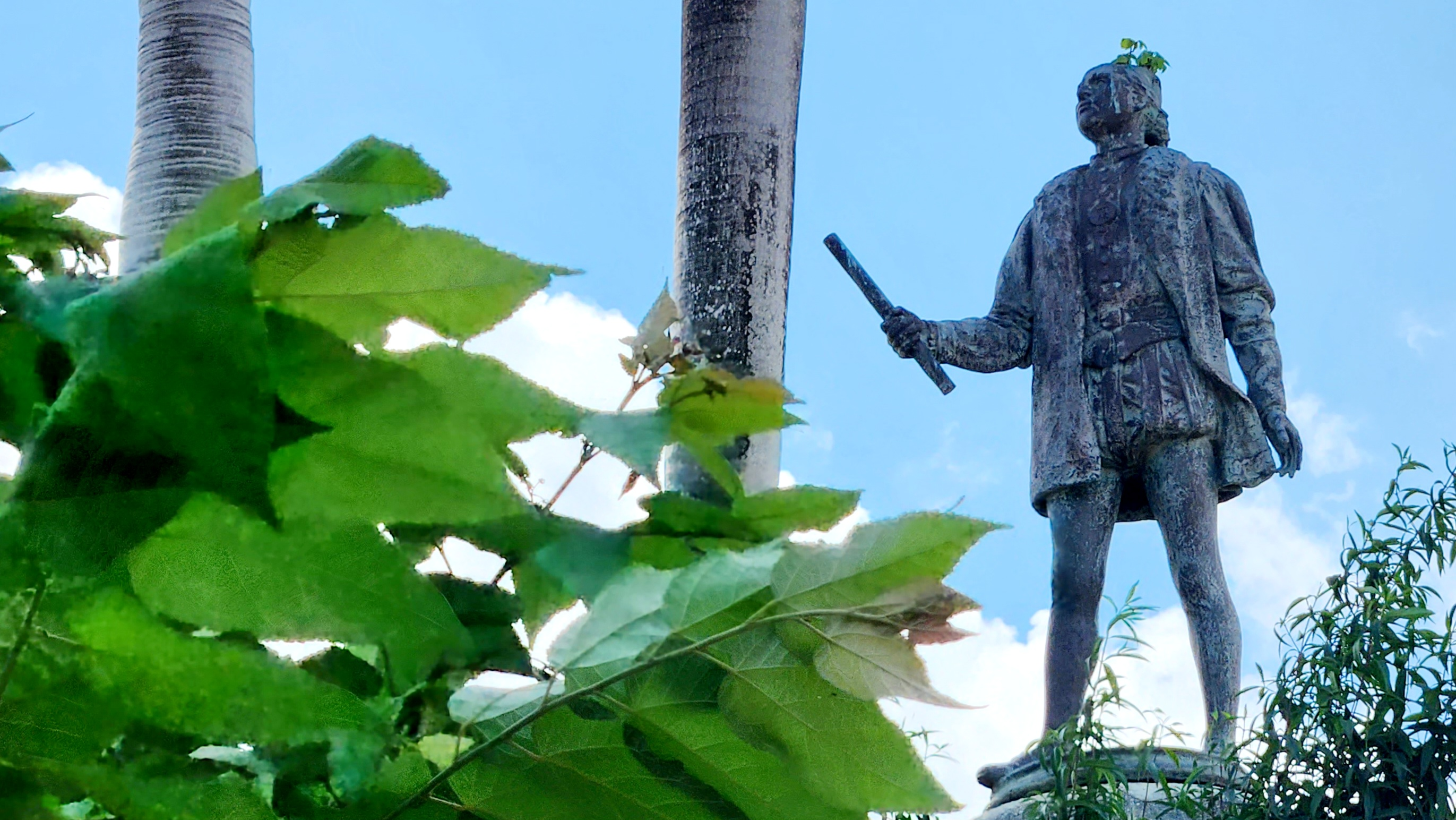
Christopher Columbus statue

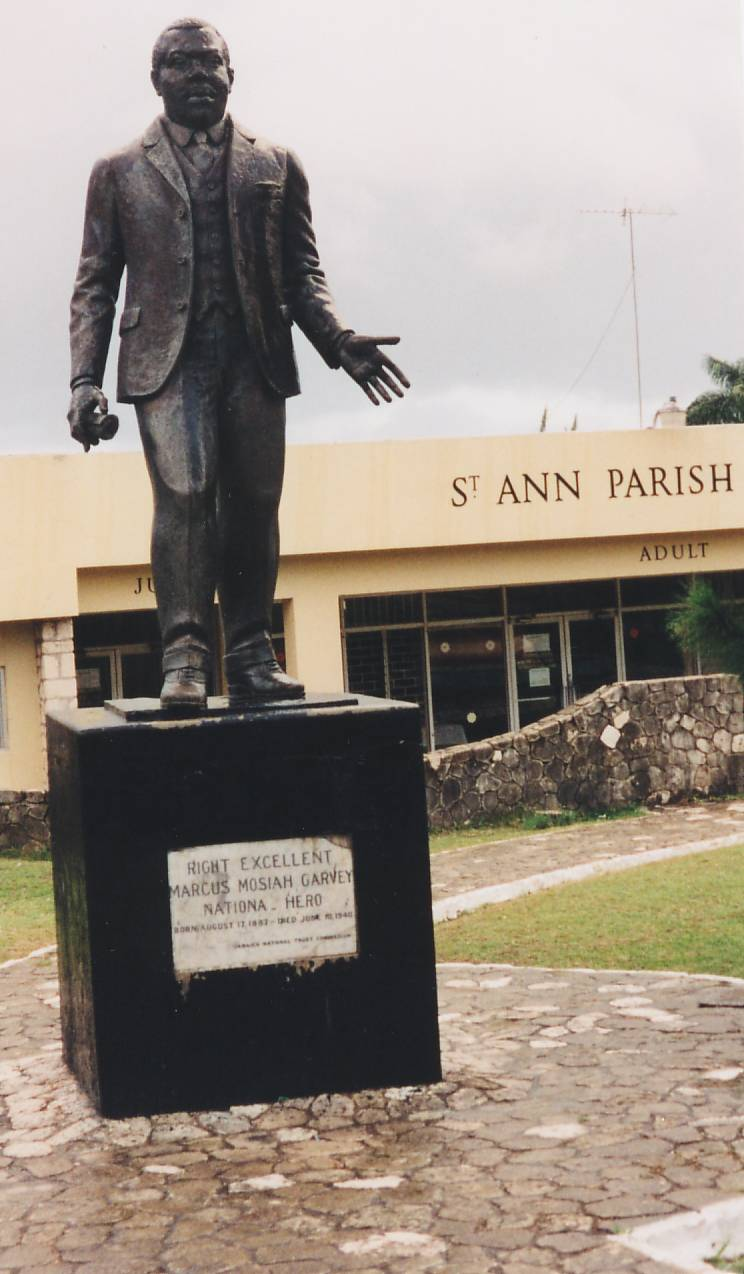
Marcus Garvey statue

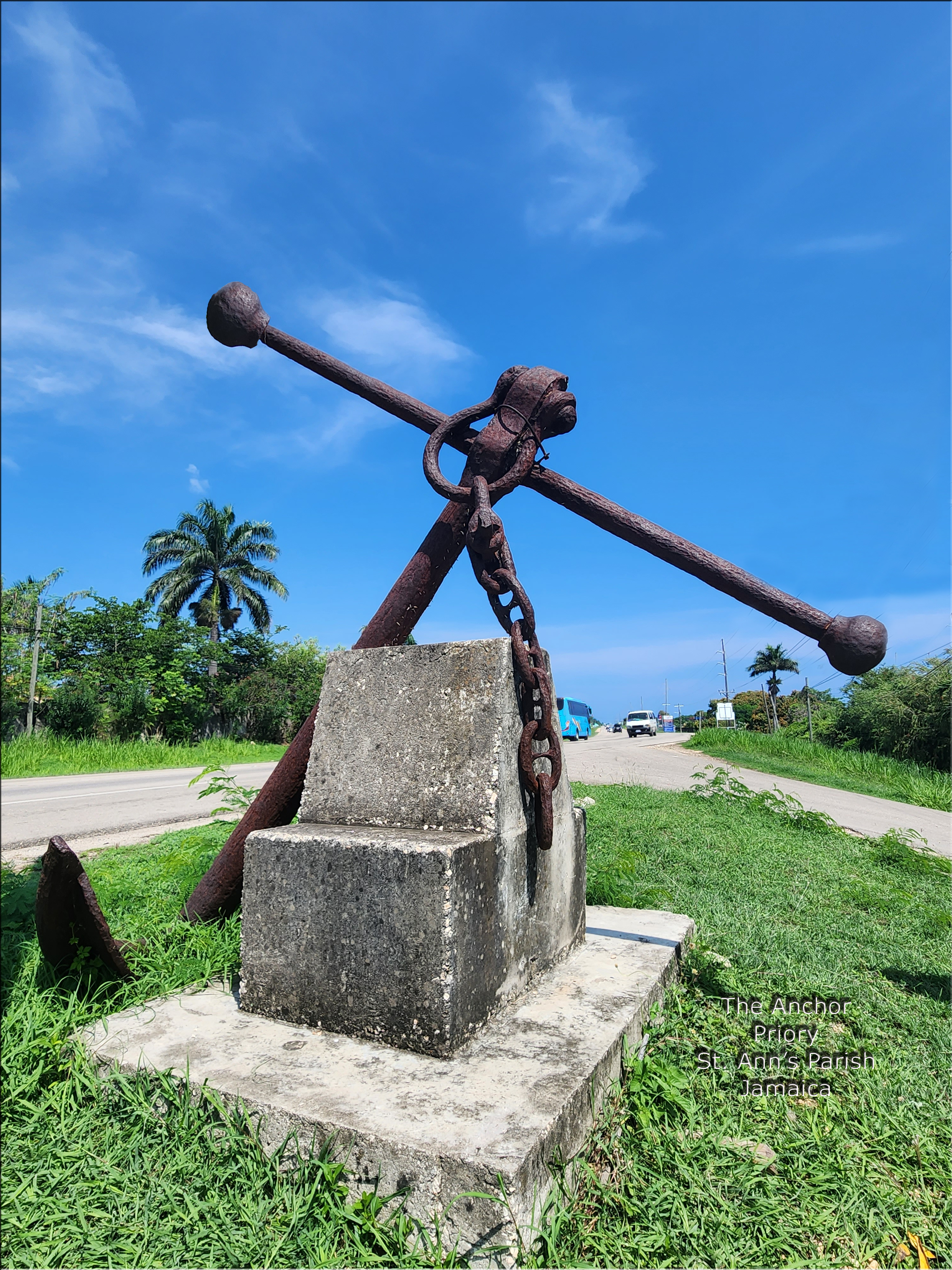
HMS Hinchinbrooke anchor

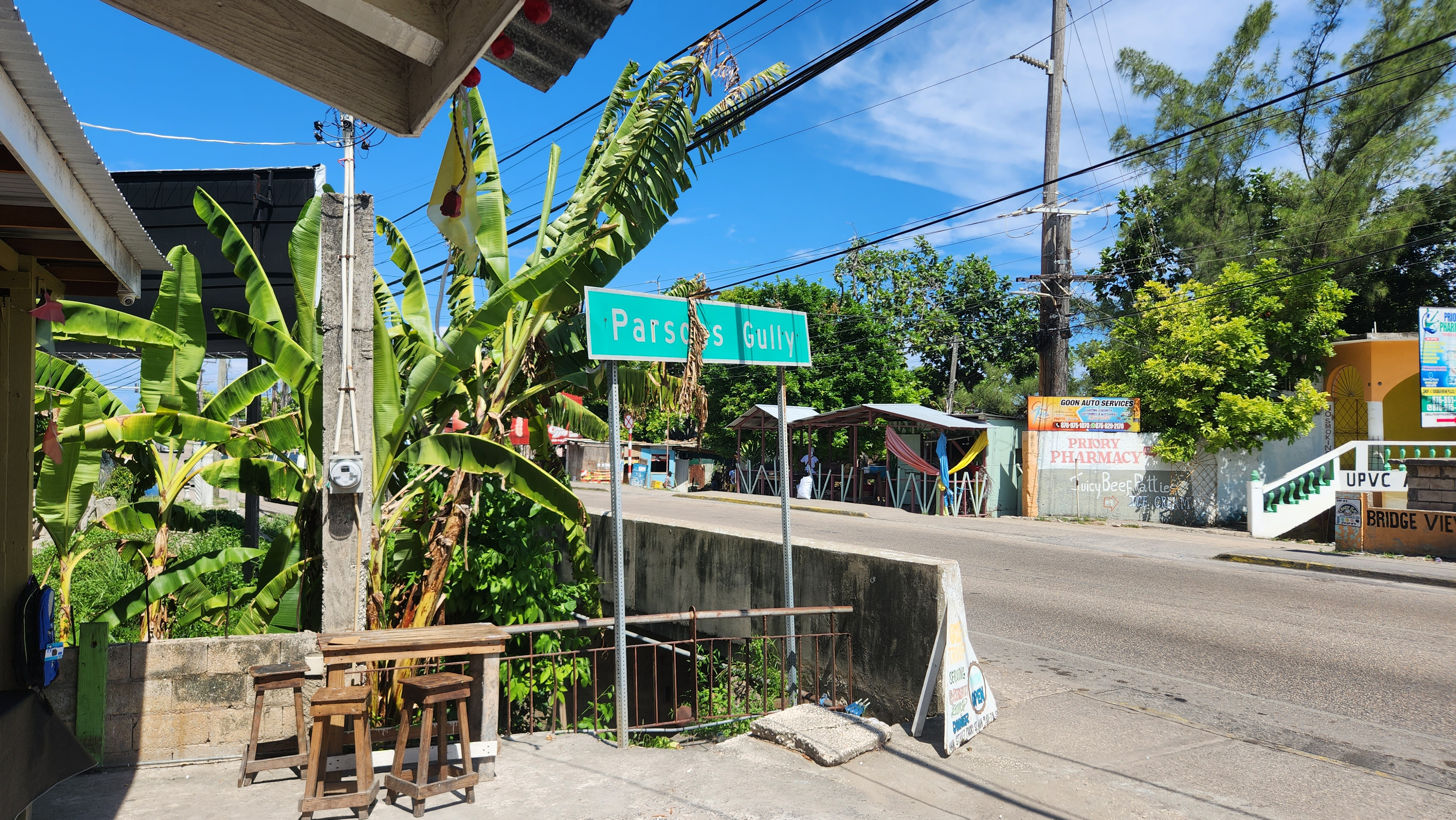
Parsons Gully, Priory, St. Ann Paris

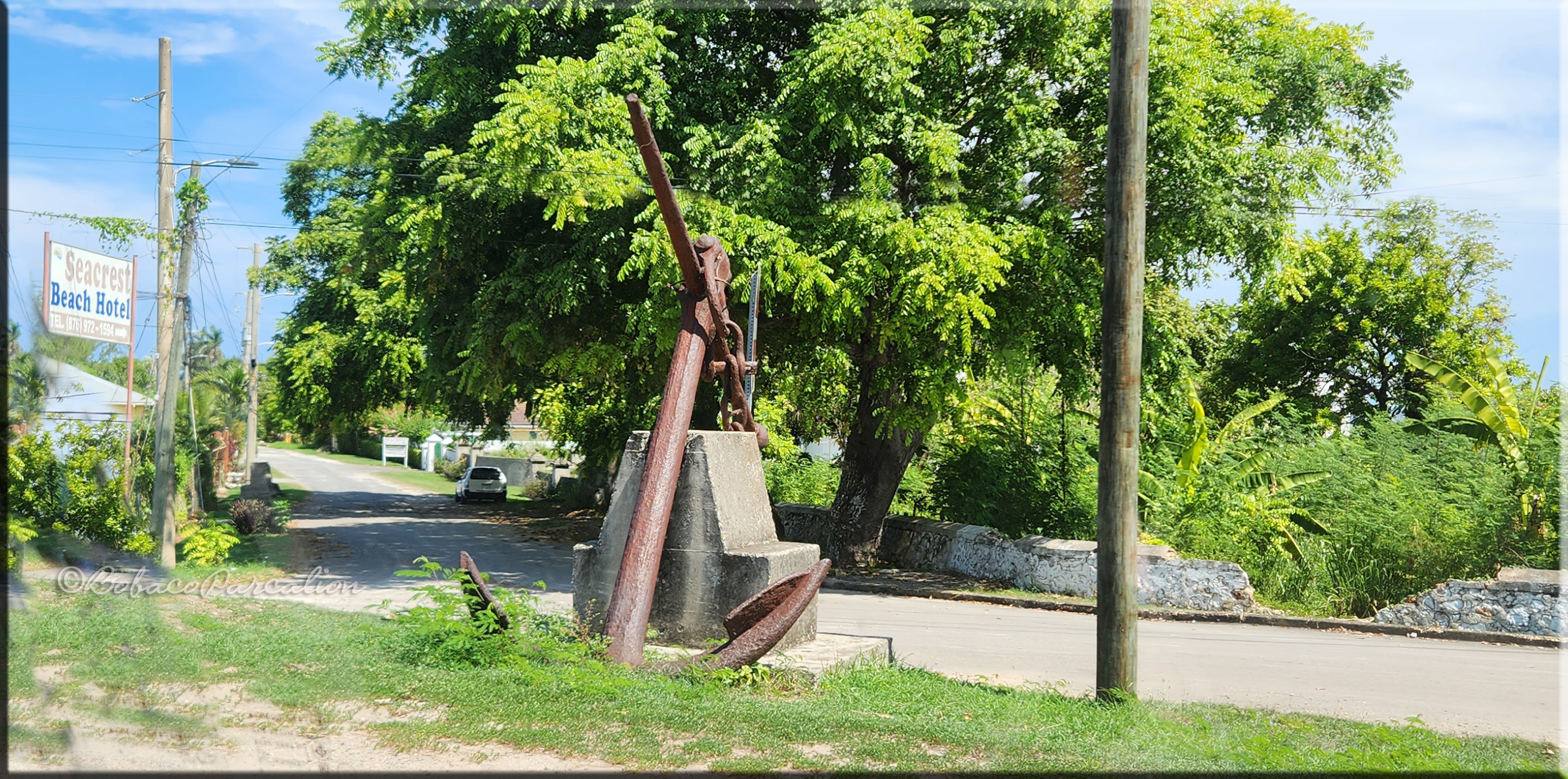
The HMS Hinchinbrooke anchor

=== Cardiff Hall ===
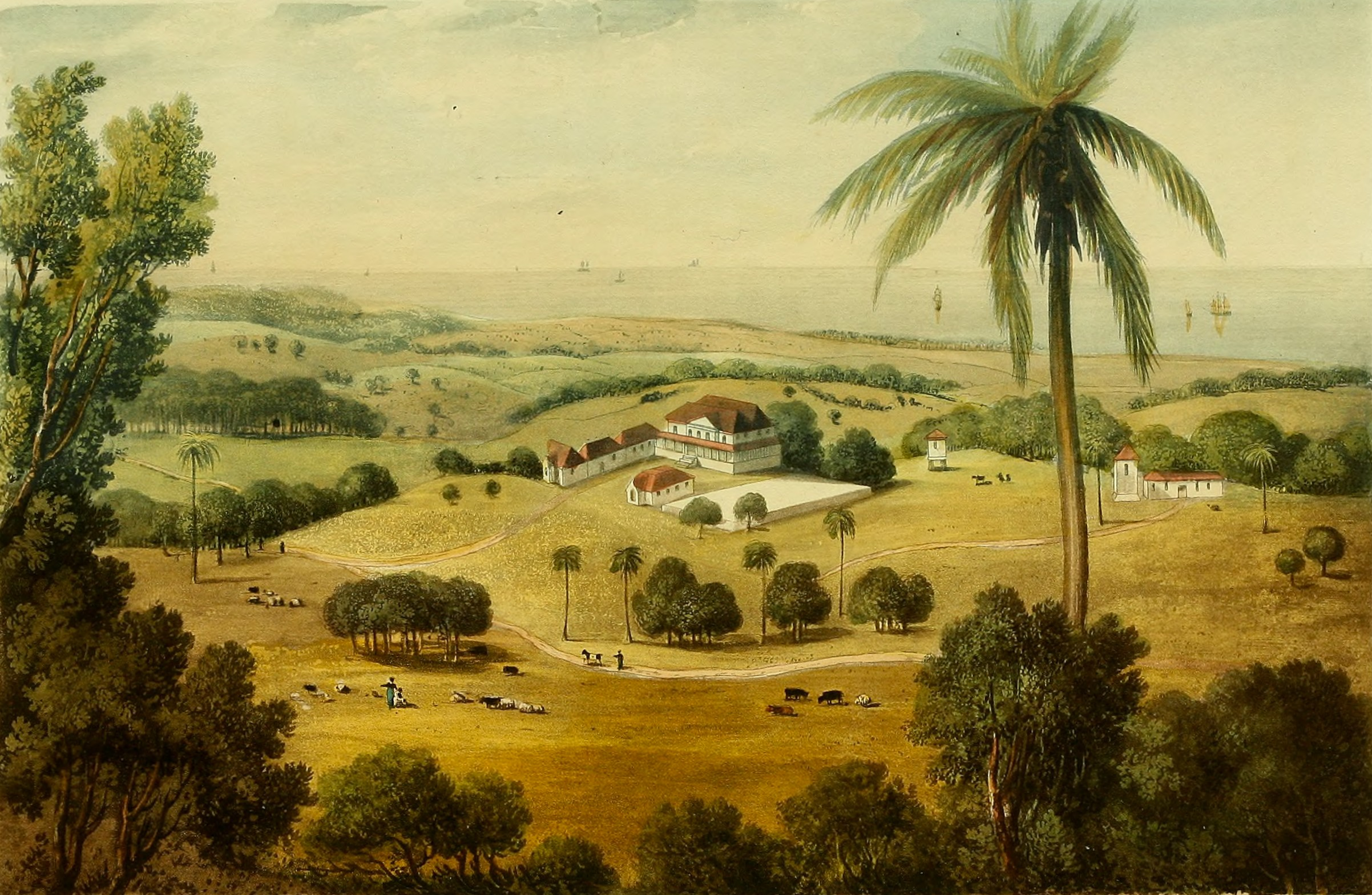
Cardiff Hall (1825)

Cardiff Hall, situated to the West of Saint Ann's Bay, was a plantation house owned by John Blagrove. The plantation was worked by 1,500 enslaved Africans. James Hakewell considered Blagrove a kind master, as he gave each slave a dollar in his will.
