= Romain Virgo =

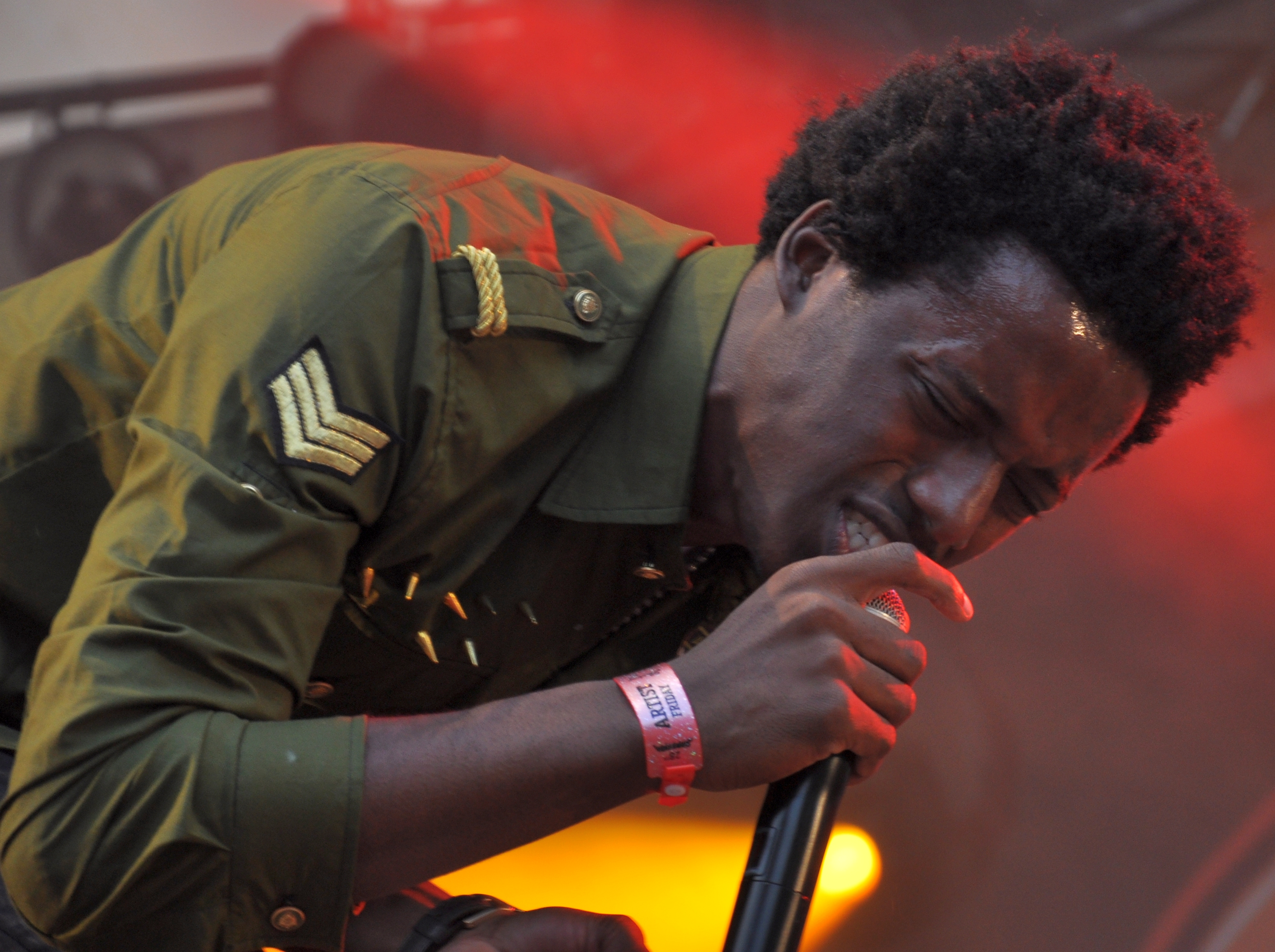
- Virgo performing at Summerjam in 2013

Background information
- Born: 24 January 1990 (age 36)
- Origin: Stepney, Saint Ann Parish, Jamaica
- Genres: Reggae
- Occupation: Singer
- Years active: 2006–present
- Labels: VP, Penthouse, Vikings Production

Romain Virgo (born 24 January 1990) is a Jamaican singer, specializing in the lovers rock style of reggae music, and a past competitor in the local music competition Rising Stars.

== Biography ==
Virgo hails from Stepney in Saint Ann Parish. As a young boy growing up in rural Saint Ann, Virgo emulated his cousin Bryan Art, an established singer and musician who specializes in Lover's Rock and Roots Reggae. At Aabuthnott Gallimore High School he sang on the school choir, with which he participated in the television choir contest All Together Sing in 2006.

As a solo singer he won the Digicel Rising Stars competition in 2007, two months before his graduation from high school. At age 17, he was the youngest contestant to ever win top prize at the competition, which included a JA$1,000,000 prize (the equivalent of 6656 euros) and a recording contract with Greensleeves Records. A few weeks after winning the competition, Virgo met Donovan Germain who produced his first hit record "Mi Caan Sleep" on the Penthouse label. Several hit singles followed, including "Wanna Go Home", "Live Mi Life", and "Alton's Medley". In June 2010, VP Records released his debut self-titled album.

After winning the Digicel competition, Virgo performed at dances and stageshows, including Rebel Salute, Passa Passa, and Weddy Weddy. In the autumn of 2010, he joined fellow artists Capleton and Munga on a tour of the United States. In addition to his music career, Virgo pursued his bachelor's degree at the Edna Manley College of the Visual and Performing Arts in Kingston, majoring in voice and minoring in keyboard.

In 2014 his cover version of Sam Smith's "Stay With Me" topped the charts in several Caribbean countries. Virgo's 2018 album Lovesick gave him his first number one album on the Billboard Reggae Albums chart.

== Personal life ==
On 17 January 2020 his wife Elizabeth gave birth to twins.

== Discography ==
=== Albums ===
- Romain Virgo RV (2010), VP Records
- The System (2012), VP Records – US Reggae no. 6
- Lovesick (2018), VP Records – US Reggae no. 1
- The Gentle Man (2024), VP Records

=== EPs ===
- Introducing...Romain Virgo (2010), VP
- Lifted (2015), VP – US Reggae no. 7

=== Singles ===
- "Love Doctor" (2008), Penthouse
- "Wanna Go Home" (2009), Vikings Production
- "Watch Over Me" (2010), Juke Boxx Productions – B-side of Elephant Man's "Don't Trust Dem"
- "Live My Life" (2010), Juke Boxx Productions – B-side of Busy Signal's "Dem Nuh Care"
- "Ghetto" (2010), Juke Boxx Productions
- "Taking You Home" (2011), Penthouse
- "Wha Dis Pon Me" (2011), Penthouse
- "California" (2011), VP – Romain Virgo & Larry Gatlin
- "Can't Sleep", VP/Penthouse
- "Who Feels It Knows It", VP/Penthouse
- "Cry Tears for You" (2012), Penthouse
- "Cold Side"(2013), Juke Boxx Productions
- "Lifted" (2015), VP Records
- "LoveSick" (2016), VP Records
- "Still" (2018)
- "Now" (2018)
- "Melanin" (2019), Chimney Records
- "Dutty Man" (2019)
- "Hero" (2020)
- "Beautiful to Me" (2021)
- "Good Woman" (2022)
