= Cave Gully =

Seasonal river in Jamaica

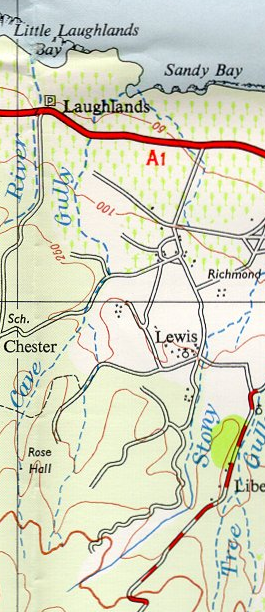
- Extract from UK Directorate of Overseas Surveys 1 to 50,000 map of Jamaica sheet F 1958 showing the course of Cave Gully

Physical characteristics
- Source
  - coordinates: 18.423°N 77.261°W
  - elevation: 1,200 feet (370 m)
- Mouth
  - location: Sandy Bay
  - coordinates: 18.458360°N 77.249521°W
  - elevation: Sea level
- Length: 3 miles (4.8 km)

Cave Gully is a seasonal river in Saint Ann Parish, Jamaica.

It flows north from just below the 1,250 foot (380 m) contour line to meet the Caribbean Sea at Sandy Bay, a small cove.
