= Bryan Art =

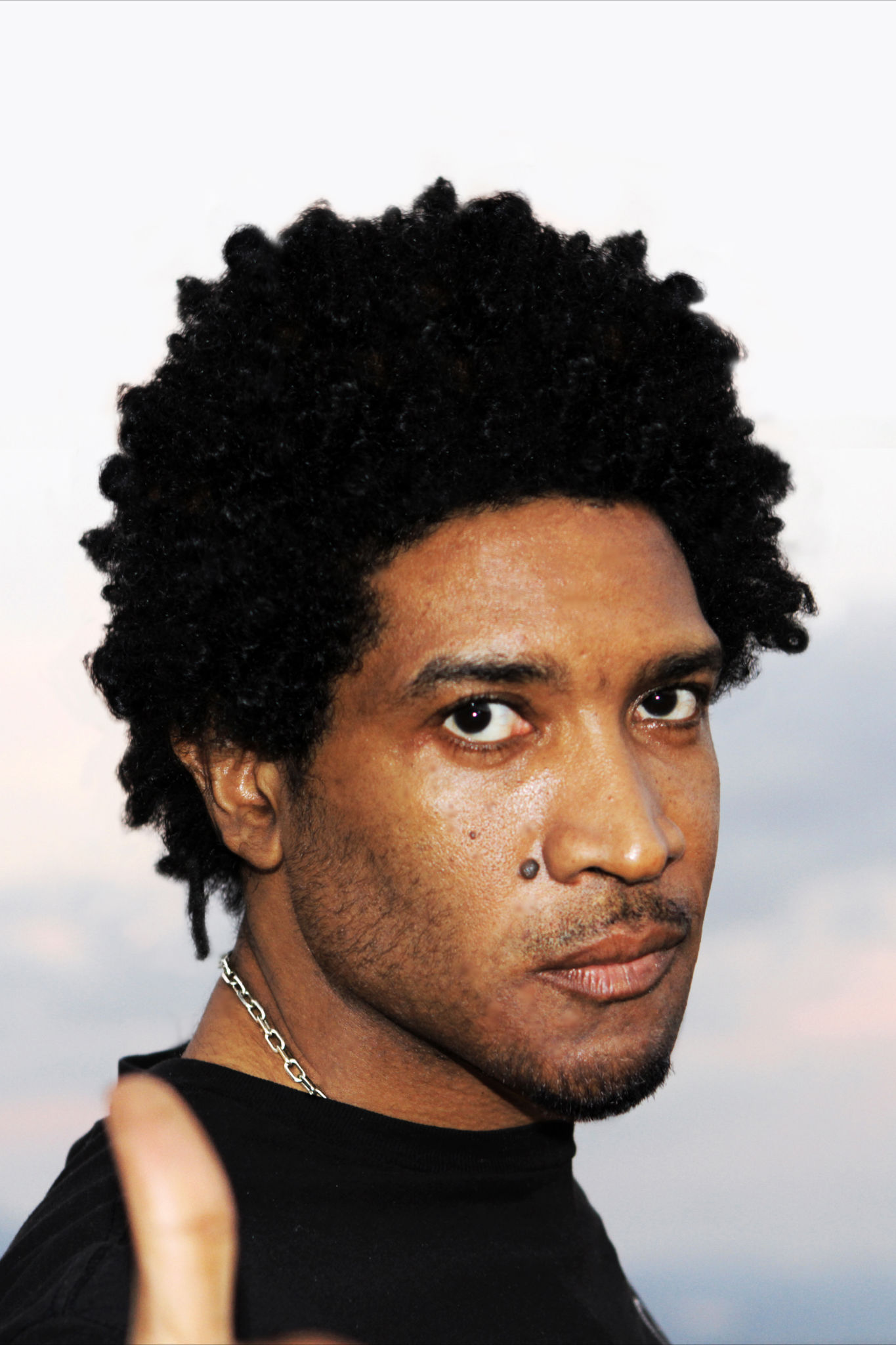
- Bryan Art by Bryan Art press release photo

Background information
- Also known as: Brah Yhan, Brahyhan Art, Gitsy
- Born: Bryan Joseph Grant; 18 September 1977 (age 48)
- Origin: Murray Mount, Saint Ann. Jamaica
- Genres: Reggae, dancehall, roots reggae, lovers rock, reggae fusion, world music
- Occupations: Recording artist, singer musician, guitarist, producer
- Instruments: Vocals, guitar
- Years active: 1995–present
- Labels: FiWi Music, Junction Files, AL.TA.FA.AN Records
- Website: bryanartmuzik.com

Bryan Art (formerly Brah Yhan or Brahyhan Art), born Bryan Joseph Grant in Murray Mount, Saint Ann Parish is a Jamaican reggae singer, songwriter, musician, producer, and guitarist. He is a former touring member of the Legendary Fire House Crew and band leader/guitarist of the Grass Roots Band. He was named Best New Artist in the year 2002 by Television Jamaica's ER (Entertainment Report).

== Biography ==
=== Background ===
Bryan Art was born in Murray Mount, a rural community in the Parish of Saint Ann, Jamaica, a few miles away from Nine Mile, where Reggae legend Bob Marley was born. Bryan, the youngest of 12 children, was raised in a home where most of his family members were musically inclined. As a young boy, Bryan emulated his eldest brother Ray, a musician and singer who had several recordings. However, it was his mother who first taught him how to play the guitar. Grant left Murray Mount in the late 1980s and moved to Kingston, Jamaica, where he currently resides. In the mid-1990s, Bryan attended The Edna Manley College of Visual and Performing Arts.

While attending the college, Grant was discovered and recruited by band leader George Miller (Fyah George) of the Firehouse Crew. He was asked to join the band as lead guitarist, providing musical support for Philip "Fatis" Burrell's Xterminator Production artists Luciano, Mikey General and Sizzla. A few years later, Grant became co-founder and band leader of Grass Roots Band, which supported and toured with Reggae artist Bushman. He also filled in occasionally as a guitarist on tours with Black Uhuru.

=== Brah Yhan to Bryan Art transition ===
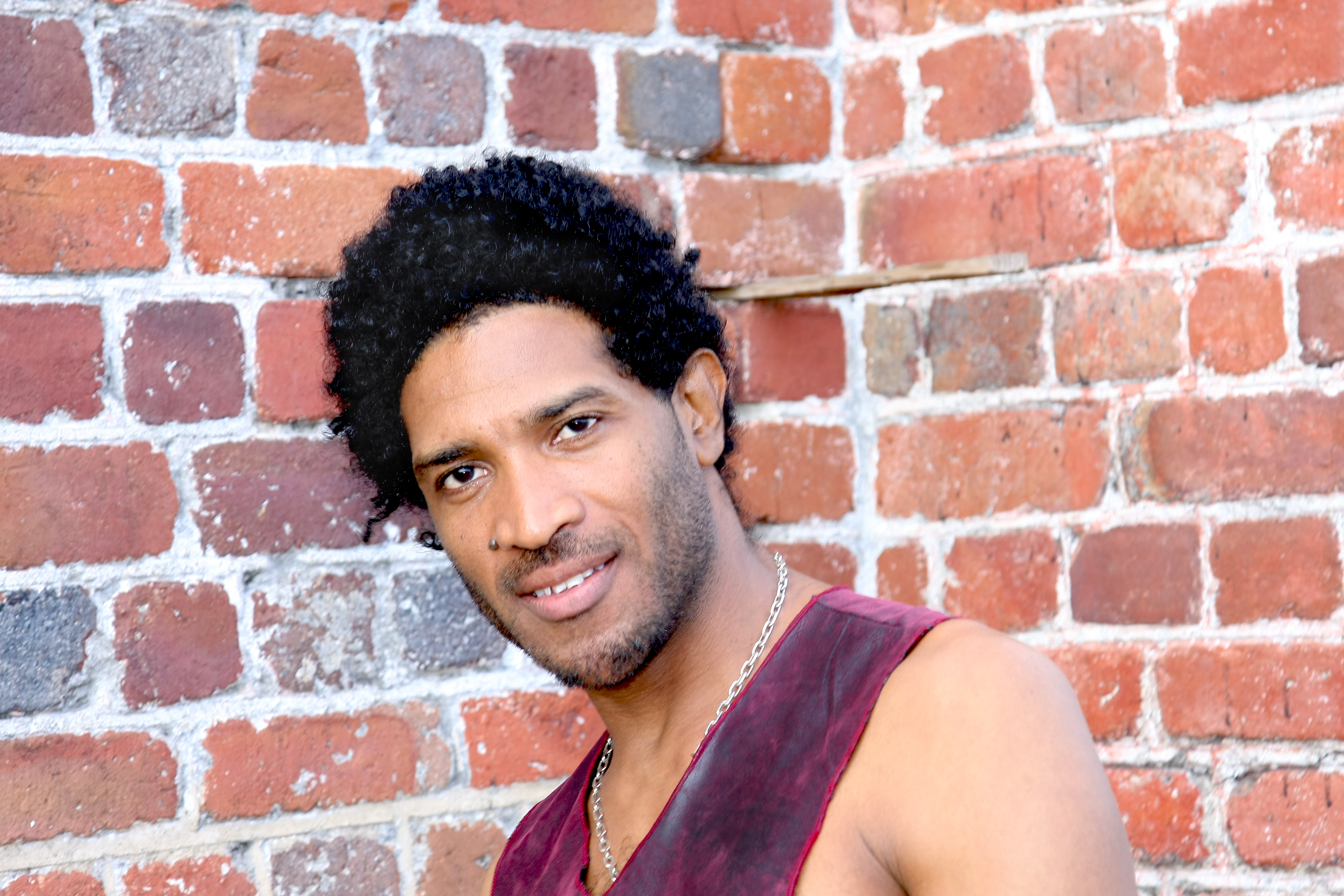
Bryan Art

In 2001, Grant released his first single as a solo artist using the stage name "Brah Yhan", which is a moniker and customized spelling/pronunciation in Jamaican Patois of the name Bryan. The track was titled Soon Come Back. This song was produced by Grant with Courtney Morrison for FiWi Music Label, who had signed him previously. In 2002, Brah Yhan was awarded the Best New Artiste of the year by Television Jamaica's ER. Over a 3-year period, Brah Yhan recorded and released several other songs, the majority under the FiWi Music Label, including "When Your Eyes Speak," "Stain," "Hug Me Baby", and "Wrong Time". However, Grant's most notable releases are "Rock And Come In" in 2004 and "Get It" in 2005. In the same year, Bryan cut ties with FiWi Music and changed his stage name to Brahyhan Art. In 2009, after his hit song "Murder Dem A Play" was released he changed his name for a second time to Bryan Art.

In 2010, Art released his debut album titled Bryan Art 20Ten on the Junction File/Jah Chin Label. In 2012, he registered his record label, Junction Files. In 2013, Bryan Art repackaged Bryan Art 20Ten and re-titled it Bryan Art with some changes to the track line up. He entered into a distribution agreement with AL.TA.FA.AN/VPAL Music Label. The following year (2014), he formed The File 13 Band which consisted of a few talented young musicians he recruited from his Alma Mater. Later that year, he released Fresh Start EP on his own Junction Files Label.

=== Career ===
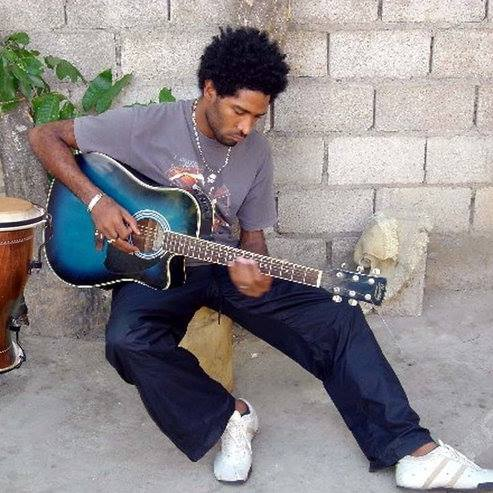
Bryan Art playing guitar in 2006.

Art has performed at several local and international shows including the Jamaica Jazz and Blues Festival, Rebel Salute, ATI, Fully Loaded, St. Mary Mi Come From, Unity Splash, and Reggae Month event. He was appointed Reggae Month Ambassador for 2014. Art has appeared on national television shows including TVJ's Smile Jamaica, Entertainment Prime, CVM TV's On Stage and CVM at Sunrise, among others.

His international appearances included tours of the Caribbean, United States, Europe and Canada. In Europe, he performed at Reggae Jam 2011. In Canada, he performed at Calgary International Reggae Festival in 2012. As a songwriter, he has penned songs for artists such as Etana, George Nooks, Singing Melody, Bushman, and Luciano. As a musician, he has recorded scores of Guitar tracks on many local and international projects including The Sunshine Riddim on Nelly Furtado's "Turn Off The Light" (Reggae Mix), The Natty Bay Riddim on her song "... On the Radio (Remember the Days)." He appears on Queen Ifrica's hit song "Far Away" Acoustic remix.

He has been featured in Reggae magazines and websites such as United Reggae, Reggaeville, Reggae France and Irie Mag. He has also been featured on several international blogs including Jamendo in 2014. Today, Bryan Art has appeared on several Reggae/Dancehall Riddim compilation albums along with some of the leading Reggae recording artists.

== Discography ==
=== Albums ===
Studio Albums
Title	Release date	Label	Format
Bryan Art 20Ten	28 May 2010	Jah Chin/Junction File	CD, Digital distribution
Bryan Art	16 Apr 2013	AL.TA.FA.AN/VPAL Music	CD, Digital Distribution

=== EPs ===
EPs
Title	Release date	Label	Format
Knowledge Is The Power EP	7 Aug 2015	Junction Files	Digital Distribution
Fresh Start E.P	20 Jun 2014	Junction Files	Digital Distribution

=== Singles ===
Singles
Title	Label	Release year	Format
"Soon Come Back"	FiWi Music	2001	Vinyl
"When Your Eyes Speak"	FiWi Music	2002	45 Record|Vinyl
"Stain"	Fiwi Music	2002	45 Record|Vinyl
"Hug Me Baby"	Fiwi Music	2002	45 Record|Vinyl
"Get Over It"	FiWi Music	2003	45 Record|Vinyl
Never Throw My Love"	Acoustic Vibes	2003	45 Record|Vinyl
"Don't Come Knocking"	Fiwi Music	2003	45 Record|Vinyl
"Players Style"	Jah Snowcone	2003	45 Record|Vinyl
"Wrong Time"	Tuff Riddim	2004	45 Record|Vinyl
"Bonafide"	Fiwi Music	2004	45 Record|Vinyl
"Send Dem On"	Kirkledove Records	2004	45 Record|Vinyl
"Rocking The Blues"	FiWi Music	2004	45 Record|Vinyl
"Rock And Come In"	Fiwi Music	2004	45 Record|Vinyl
"Blazing Hot"	FiWi Music	2004	45 Record|Vinyl
"Get It"	Fiwi Music	2005	45 Record|Vinyl
"Get It Remix"	Cap Calcini	2005	45 Record|Vinyl
"Restrain The Youth"	Vertex Records	2005	45 Record|Vinyl
"Somewhere"	Jamplified Records	2008	45 Record|Vinyl
"Best of My Love"	M Bass Productions	2008	45 Record|Vinyl
"Murder Dem A Play"	Andrew Khool Inc.	2009	45 Record|Vinyl, Digital Distribution
"Dem Fass"	Junction Files	2011	Digital Distribution
"Dem Fass Remix" (feat. Capleton)	Junction Files	2012	Digital Distribution
"Fresh Start"	Junction Files	2013	Digital Distribution
"Knowledge Is The Power"	Junction Files	2013	Digital Distribution
"Murder Dem A Play 3Mix" (feat. Sizzla & Queen Ifrica)	Junction Files	2014	Digital Distribution
"Miss You Bad"	G-Block Records	2017	Digital Distribution
"Can't Cut Wi Vibes"	G-Block Records	2017	Digital Distribution

== Bibliography ==
- A Fresh Start For Bryan Art, www.reggaeearthunited.com
- Bryan Art on www.reggaeville.com
- Bryan Art on www.mtv.com
- Bryan Art Knowledge Is The Power music video, www.topshelfreggae.com
- Bryan Art on www.onlylyrics.com
