= Saint Ann Parish =

Parish of Jamaica

Saint Ann Sint An
- Parish
- Etymology: Named after Saint Anne
- Saint Ann in Jamaica
- Coordinates: 18.31°N 77.2136°W
- Country: Jamaica
- County: Middlesex
- Capital: Saint Ann's Bay
- Major towns: Saint Ann's Bay, Ocho Rios, Brown's Town, Runaway Bay, Claremont

Area (Note: The title of largest parish in Jamaica has caused some confusion. The parishes of St. Catherine, Saint Elizabeth or St. Ann are usually ranked as the largest, depending on the source. The Gleaner, one of the nation's most reputable newspapers, lists St. Catherine as the largest with an area of 1,260 km², St. Ann as the second largest with 1,200 km^{2}, and St. Elizabeth third with 1,185 km². However, The Jamaica Library Service database ranks St. Ann the largest with an area of 1212.6 km², St. Elizabeth second with 1212.4 km², and St. Catherine third with 1192.4 km².)
  - Total: 1,212.6 km^{2} (468.2 sq mi)
  - Rank: 1

Population (2012)
  - Total: 173,232
  - Density: 142.86/km^{2} (370.01/sq mi)
- Demonym: Saint Annies

Saint Ann (Jamaican Patois: Sint An) is the largest parish in Jamaica. It is situated on the north coast of the island, in the county of Middlesex, roughly halfway between the eastern and western ends of the island. It is often called "the Garden Parish of Jamaica" on account of its natural floral beauty. Its capital is Saint Ann's Bay. Saint Ann includes New Seville, the first Spanish settlement in Jamaica.

Saint Ann is the birthplace of reggae singers Floyd Lloyd, Burning Spear, Busy Signal, Bryan Art, Romain Virgo, Rashawn Dally, Chezidek, Shabba Ranks, Justin Hinds, Perfect, and Bob Marley. Marcus Mosiah Garvey, one of the seven recipients of Jamaica's Order of National Hero, also was born there.

== History ==
Saint Ann is one of the earliest-populated areas in the island of Jamaica, its population tracing back to 600–650 AD. It is believed to be the earliest Taino/Arawak settlement in Jamaica. When Christopher Columbus first came to Jamaica in 1494, he landed on the shores of Saint Ann at Discovery Bay. He returned to Jamaica on his fourth voyage and was eventually marooned for one year at Saint Ann's Bay (June 1503 – June 1504), which he called Santa Gloria. The first Spanish settlement in Jamaica was also at Sevilla la Nueva, now called Seville, just to the west of Saint Ann's Bay. Established by Juan de Esquivel, the first Spanish Governor of Jamaica, Saint Ann's Bay became the third capital established by Spain in the Americas. The first sugar mills were established by the Spaniards in Sevilla la Nueva before 1526. After 1655, when the English captured Jamaica, Saint Ann's Bay gradually developed as a fishing port with many warehouses and wharves. The parish of Saint Ann was later named after Anne Hyde, the first wife of King James II of England. Ocho Rios began to develop as a modern town and a favourite tourist destination in Jamaica. Its development commenced when Reynolds Jamaica Mines built a deep-water pier, west of the town to ship bauxite ore from the mines.

In the 1960s the Saint Ann Development Council began the systematic development of Ocho Rios, creating a modern town.

== Geography ==
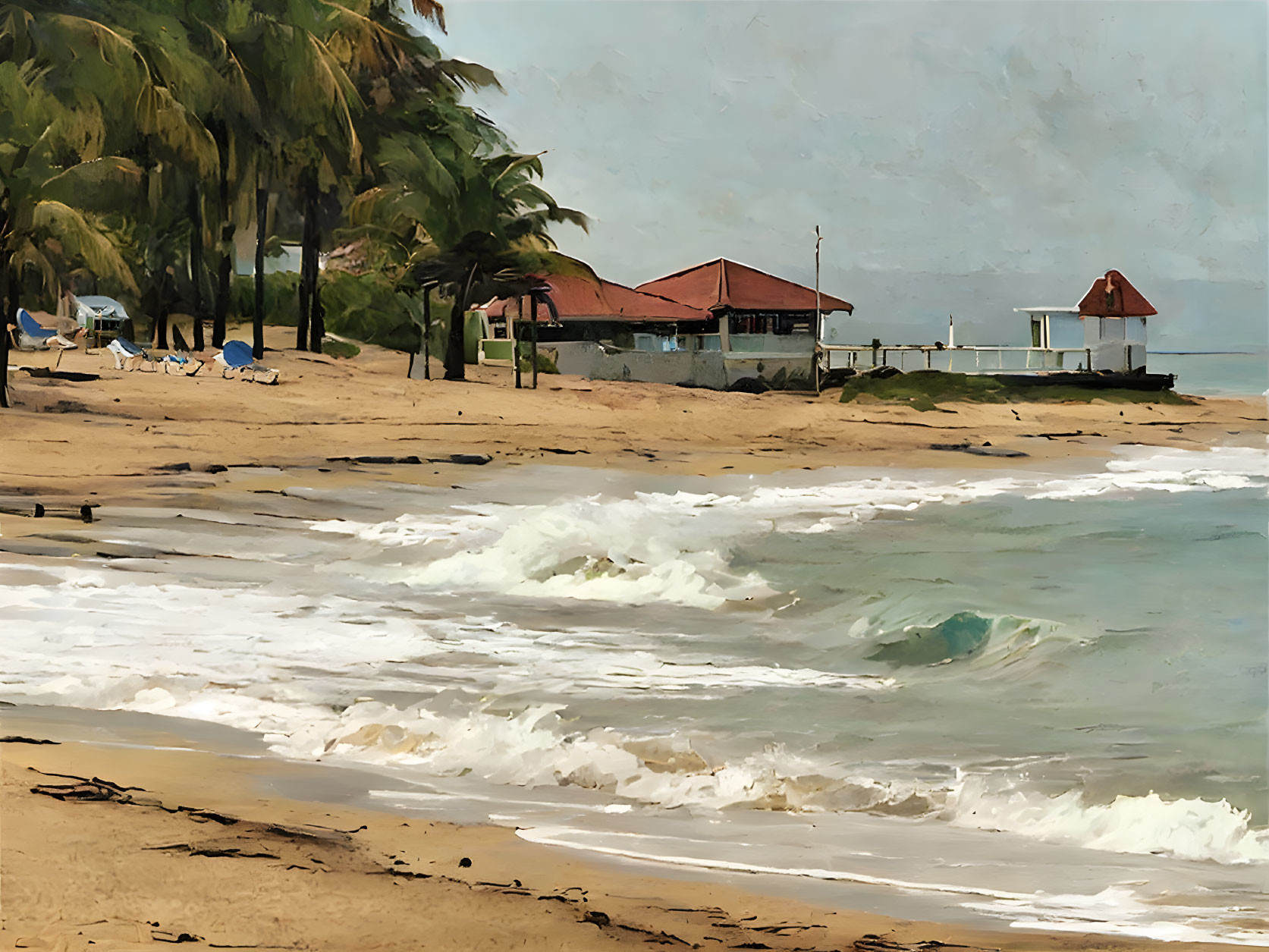
The beach at SunSpot Runaway Bay

The parish is located at latitude 18°12'N, longitude 77°28'W. It is bordered by Clarendon and Saint Catherine in the south, Saint Mary in the east, and Trelawny in the west. As with all but one parish, its coast is washed by the Caribbean Sea. Saint Ann covers an area of 1,212.6 km^{2}, making it the largest parish, before Saint Elizabeth's 1,212.4 km^{2}. The population was an estimated at 173,232 in 2012. Besides Saint Ann's Bay, other important towns located in Saint Ann are Discovery Bay, Brown's Town, and Ocho Rios.

The highest elevation in the parish is in the Dry Harbour Mountains at 762 metres above sea level. Because of its limestone formation, the parish is noted for its 59 caves and numerous sinkholes. The Moneague Lake, which varies considerably in size, is one of the few large intermittent lakes in the island. The boundary between Saint Ann and Saint Mary is formed by the White River, which flows for 27.4 kilometres. Other rivers like the Dunn's River appear intermittently, rising a few kilometres from the coast. The names of the main rivers are Negro, Saint Ann, Great, Roaring, Cave and Pedro (see List of rivers of Jamaica).

== Economy ==
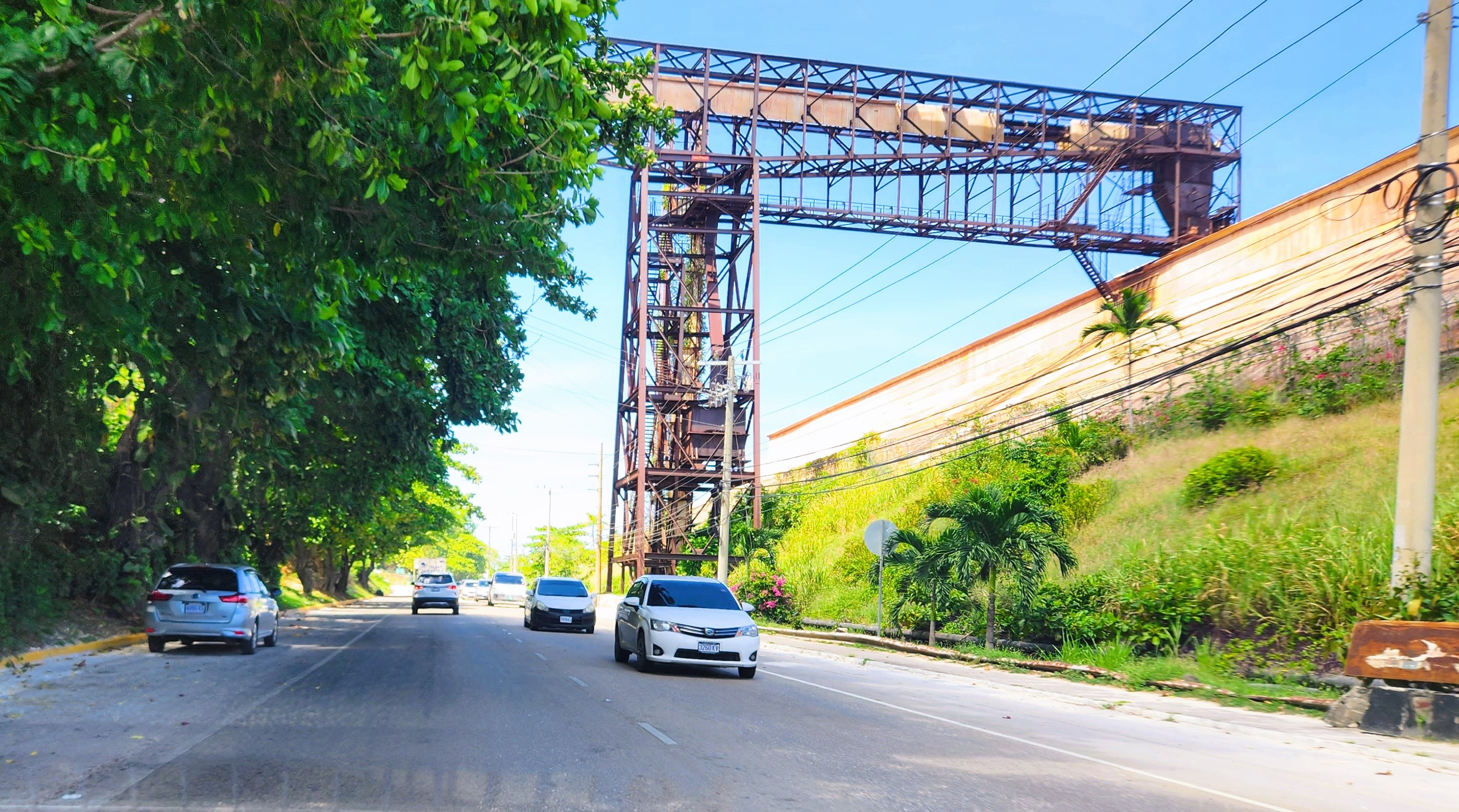
Bauxite Industry in St. Ann Parish

=== Agriculture ===
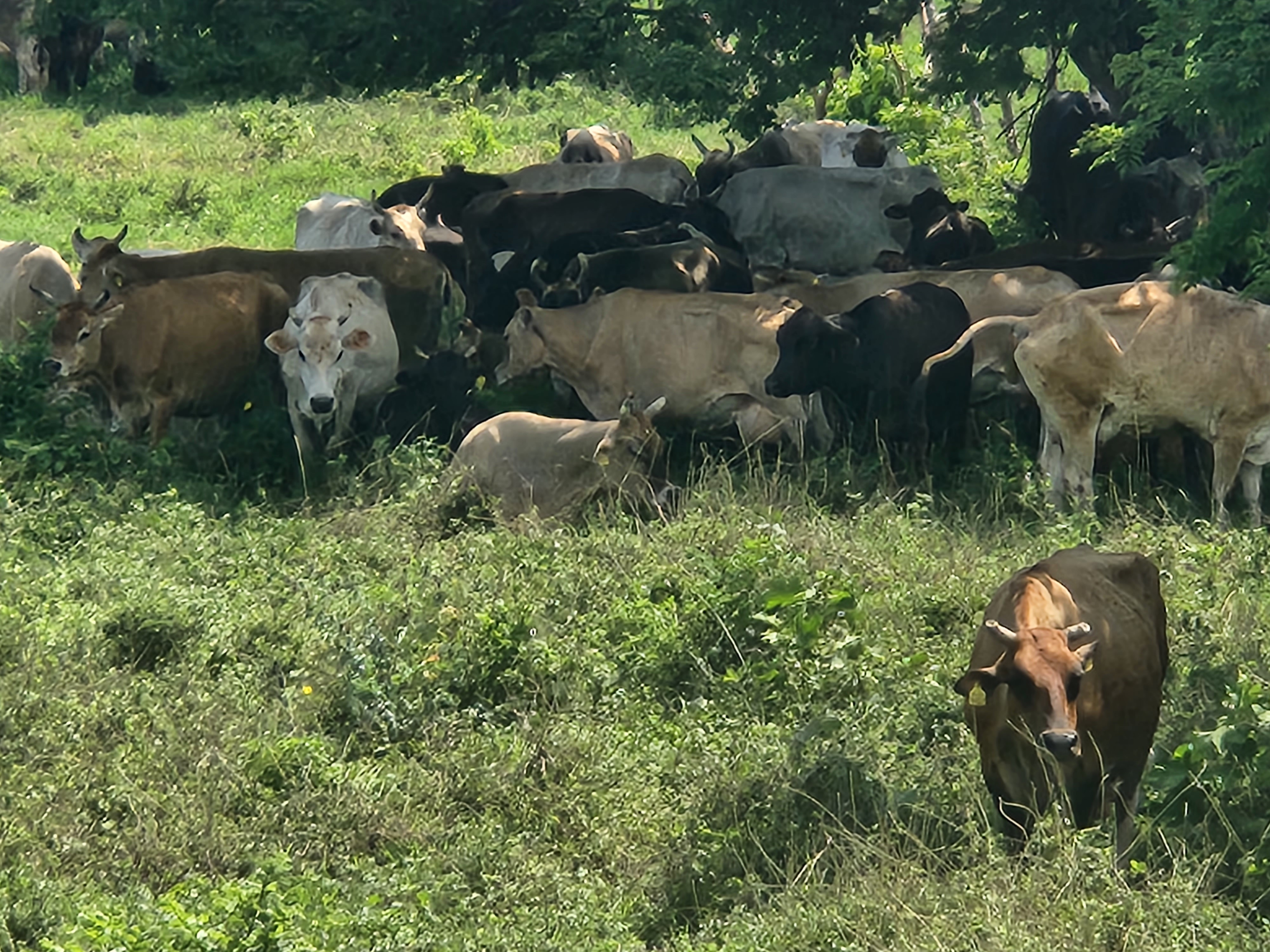
Herd of cattle

The agricultural products are mainly bananas, allspice/pimento, sugar, coconuts, coffee, limes, corn, ginger, sweet potatoes, sensimilia yam, and annatto. The soil is also suitable for citrus and, sisal is cultivated in the drier areas. The parish is also noted for cattle rearing, horses and hogs (swine). Recently, however, agriculture has been on the decline as farmland is being used for housing and other developments and the cultivated area has decreased.

=== Tourism ===
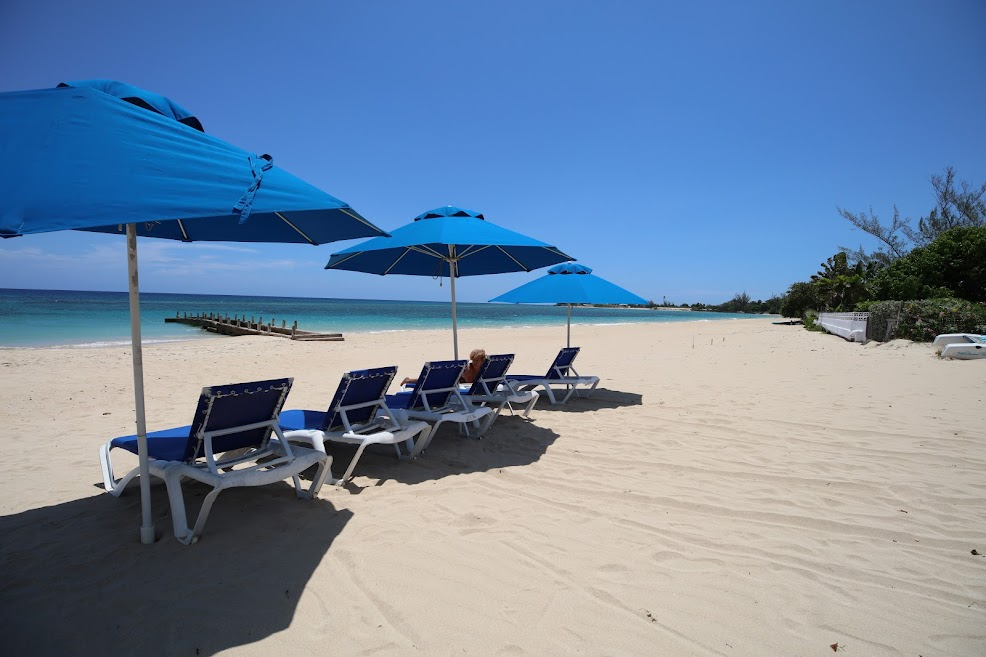
Sweet Spot villa Beach chairs out on the sand

The major economic activity in the parish is tourism. Saint Ann is one of the major tourist destinations of Jamaica, given that Dunn's River Falls and many popular beaches, like Puerto Seco Beach, are located there. There is a cruise ship dock (maritime) on the west shore of Ocho Rios Bay, and numerous hotels and resorts (including a Sandals Resort) are located in and around the city. It is also the birthplace/resting place for Bob Marley (6 February 1945 – 11 May 1981).

=== Commerce ===
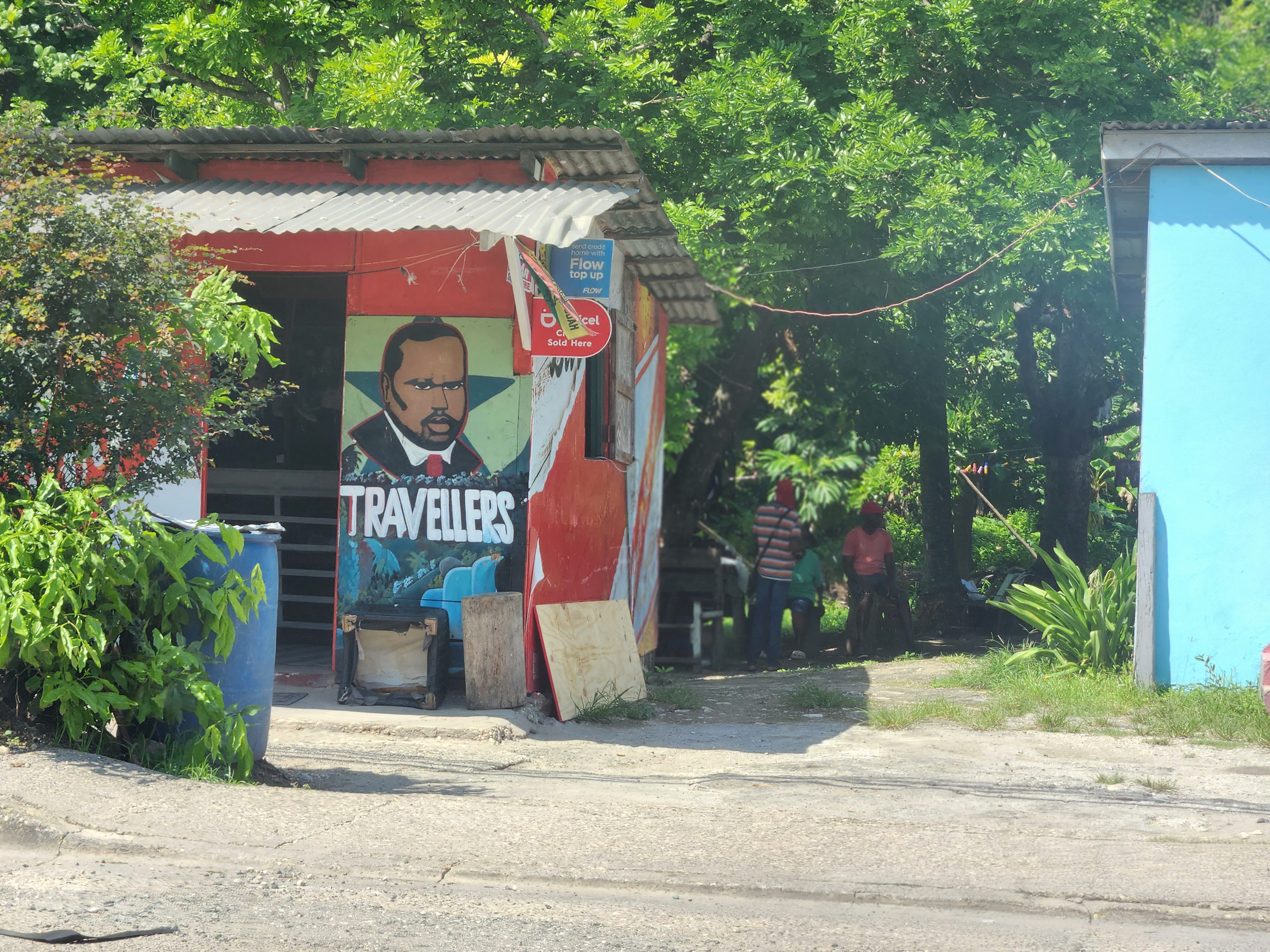
St. Ann food shop at Priory

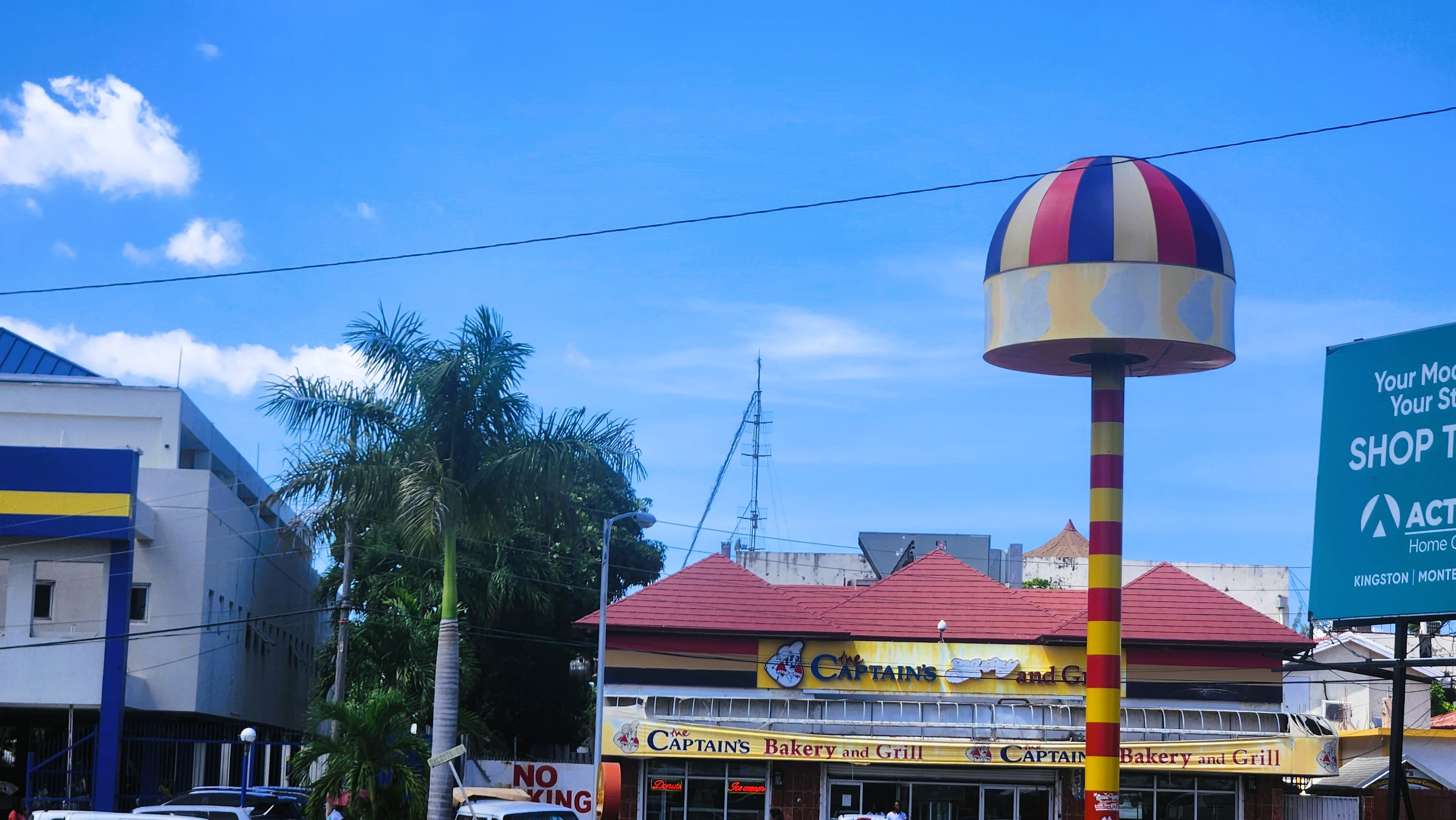
Captains Bakery and Pattie Shop.

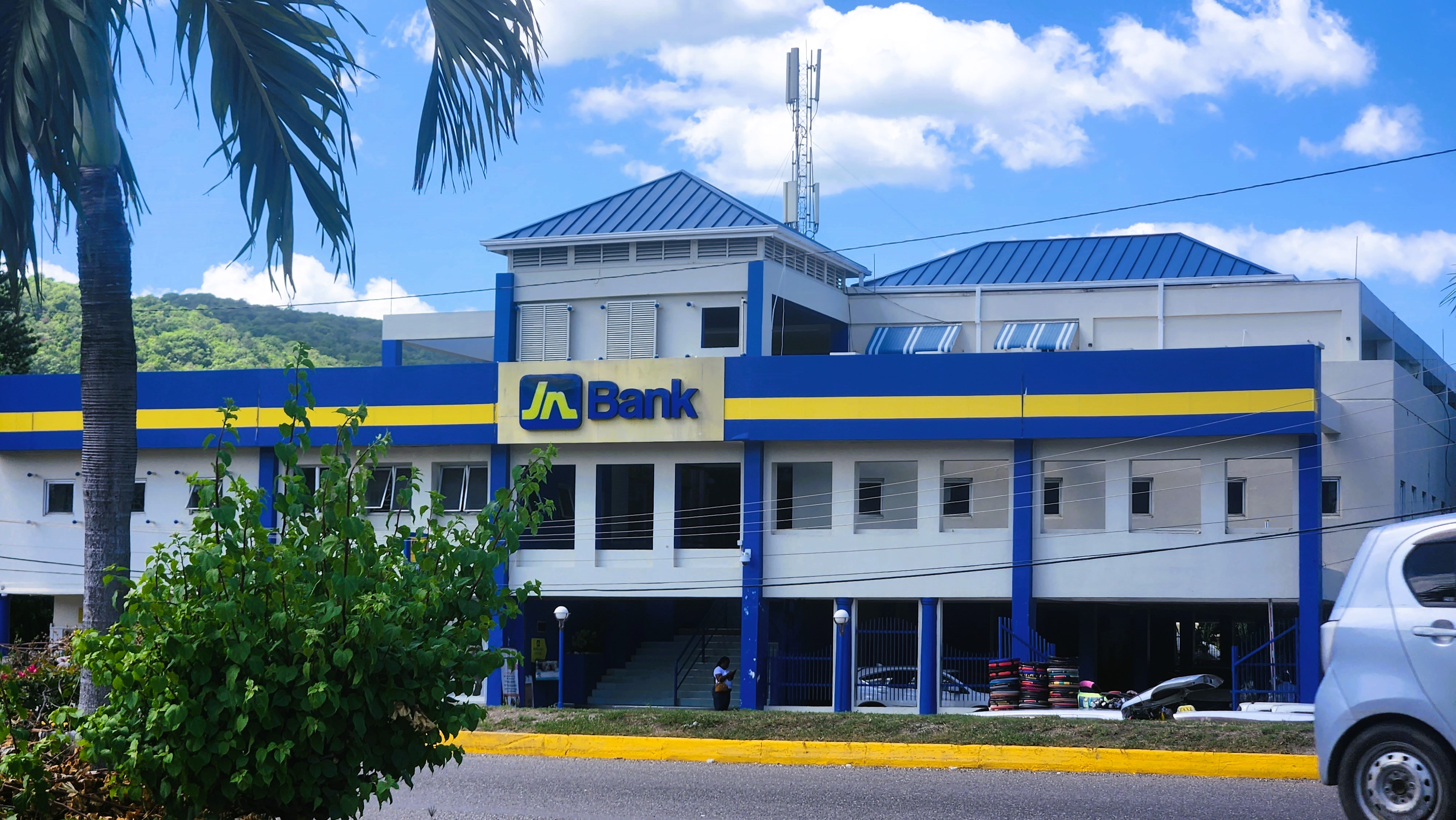
Jamaica National Bank branch

Banks and supermarkets along with some restaurants make up the rest of the economy. The farmers market where small farmers and food vendors operate is also a source of employment for the locals.

== Education ==
=== High schools ===
- Ferncourt High School
- York Castle High School
- St. Hilda's High School
- Ocho Rios High School
- Marcus Garvey Technical High School
- Brown's Town High School
- Aabuthnott Gallimore High School
- Saint Ann's Bay High School (Private)
- Prospect College (private semi-military)
- The NorthGate High School(Private)
- Steer Town Academy
- Mount Pleasant Academy (Private)

=== Community colleges ===
- Brown's Town Community College
- Moneague College

== Transportation ==
Saint Ann Parish is served along its coastline by the Northern Coastal Highway, a coastal road formed by the A3 and the A1 roads. The A3 runs from Drax Hall eastward through Ocho Rios and continues beyond the parish boundary into Saint Mary Parish. At Drax Hall, T3, the Edward Seaga Highway, reaches its northern terminus after approaching from the south. From this same point, the A1 continues the Northern Coastal Highway westward along the parish's coast, passing through towns such as Runaway Bay and Discovery Bay.

In the southern part of the parish, T3 and the A1 together serve the interior towns of Moneague and Golden Grove (Lydford). The A1 passes directly through Moneague, while T3 bypasses the town via its own interchange, which also provides access to a rest stop and service area at nearby Unity Valley. Further south, T3 has an interchange serving Golden Grove (Lydford) and connecting to the Golden Grove–Drax Hall Road, which links the highway to the community of Claremont as well.

== Correctional centres ==
The Hill Top Juvenile Correctional Centre, operated by the Department of Correctional Services, Jamaica, is located in Bamboo and has a capacity for 98.

The Armadale Juvenile Correctional Centre for girls was located in Alexandria but on 22 May 2009 a fire went through the facility, killing 5 girls and injuring 13 more. The replacement facility is located in Diamond Crest Villa near Alligator Pond in Manchester Parish.

The Parish also contains the historic Saint Ann's Bay Old Jail, perhaps the first prison in Jamaica.

== Politics ==
Saint Ann Parish is represented in the Parliament of Jamaica by four single-member constituencies:

- Saint Ann North Eastern
- Saint Ann North Western
- Saint Ann South Eastern
- Saint Ann South Western

== Attractions ==
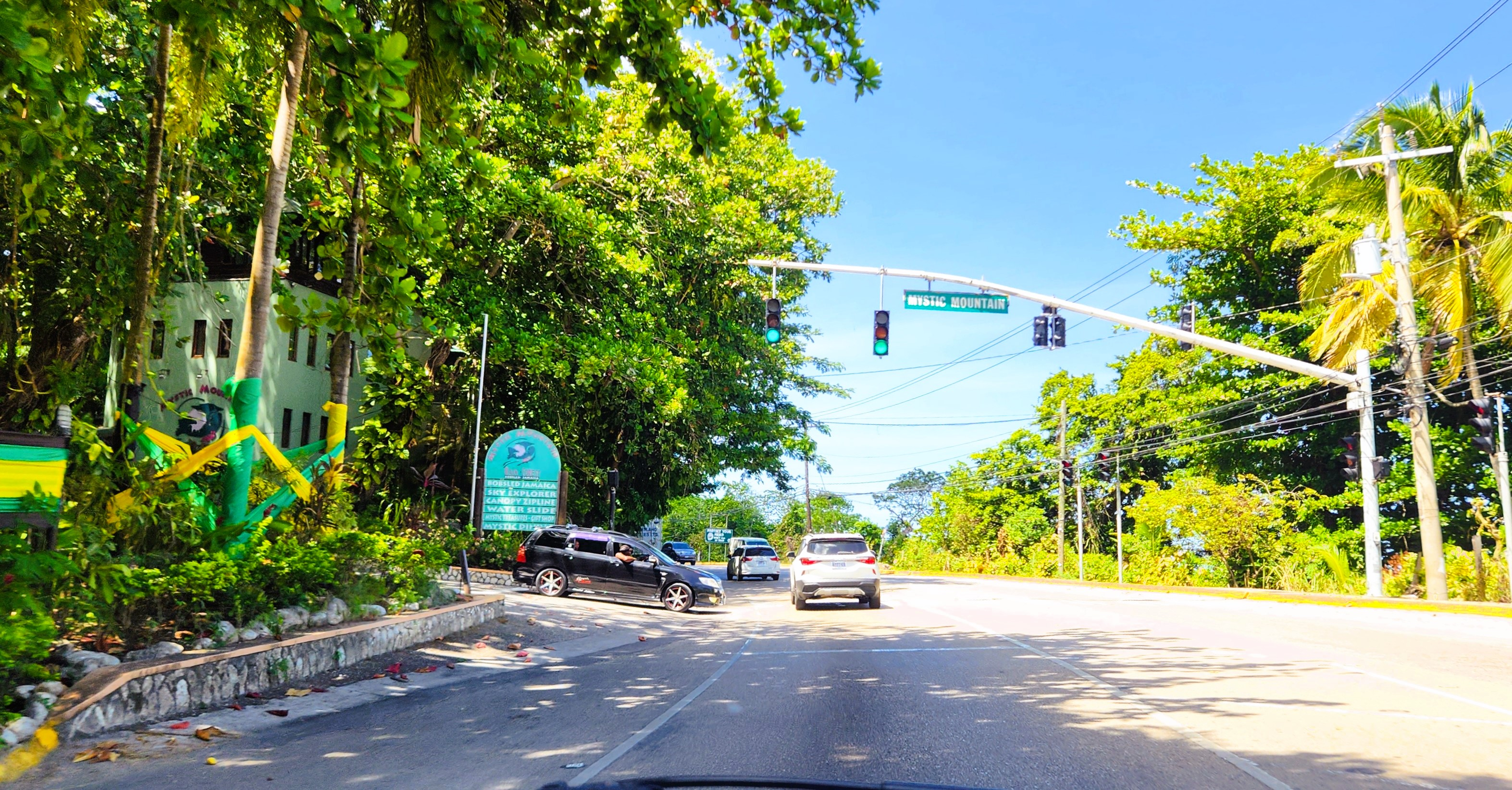
Mystic Mountain entertainment

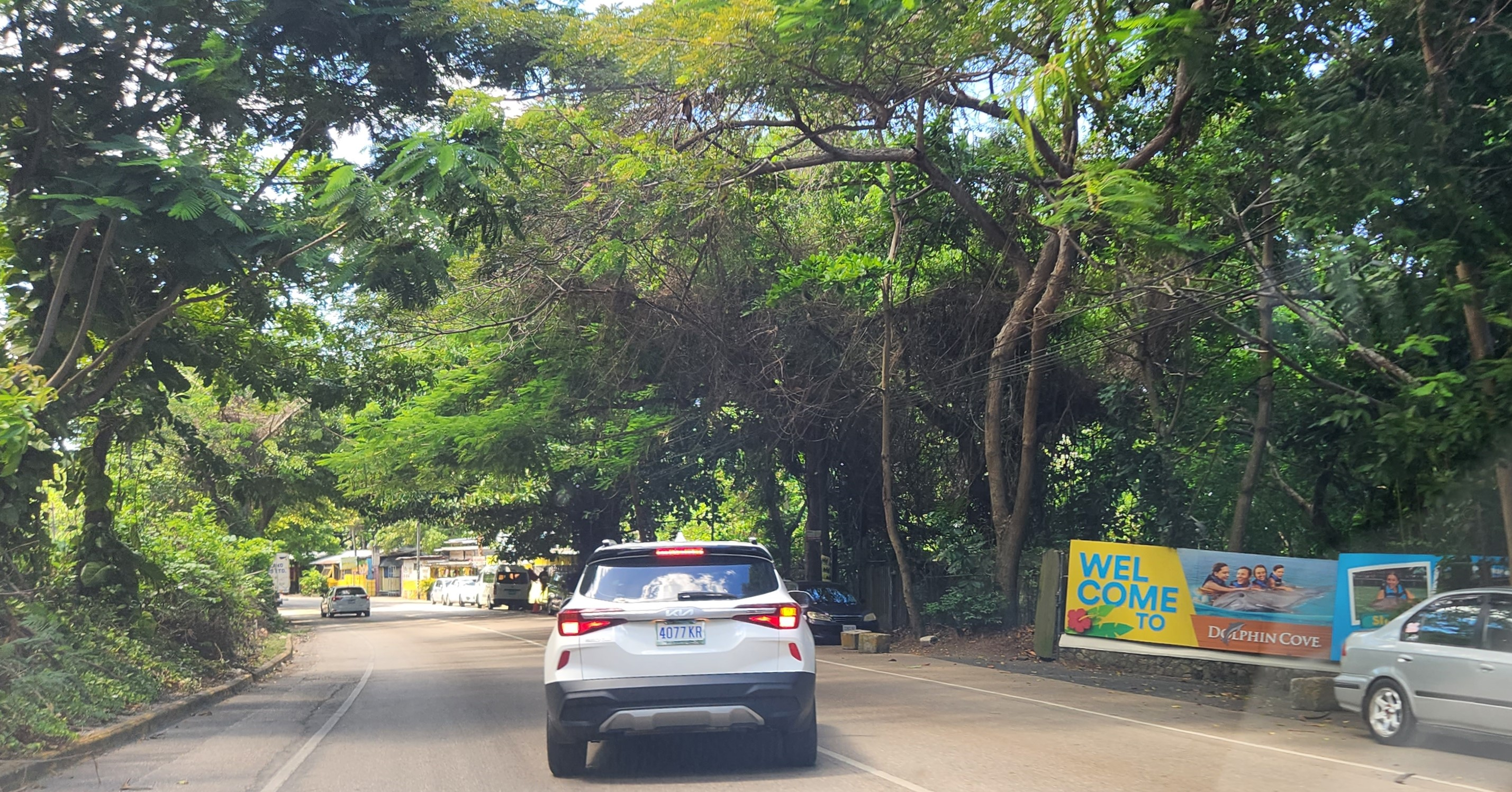
Dolphin Cove

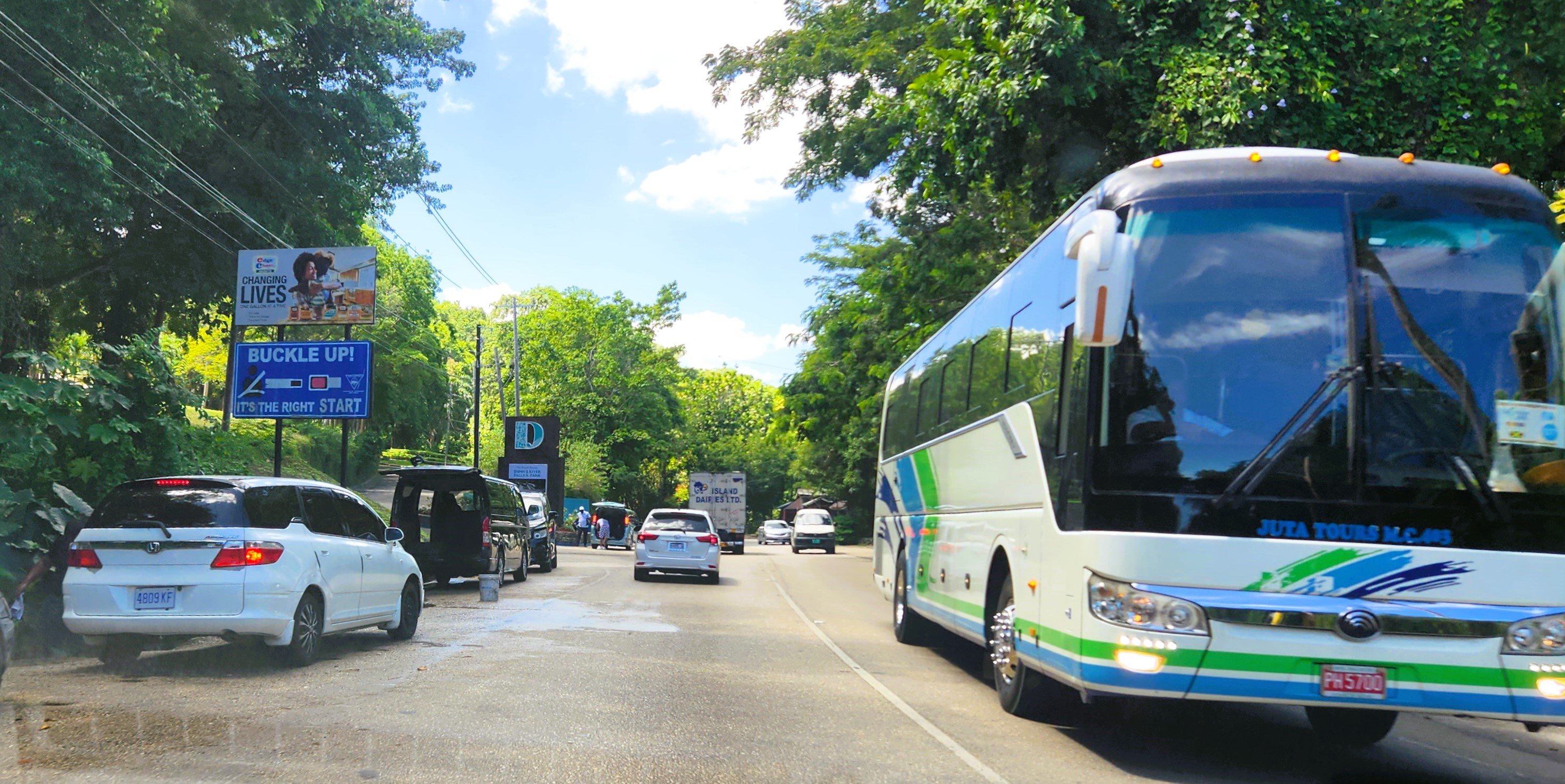
Juta Tour Bus

=== Natural ===
- Dunn's River Falls
- Green Grotto Caves
- Ocho Rios Marine Park
- Fern Gully
- Shaw Park Gardens
- Coyaba River Garden
- Puerto Seco Beach
- Chukka Cove Adventures
- White River Rafting
- Dolphin Cove
- Bob Marley Mausoleum
- Cranbrook Flower Forrest
- Seville Heritage Park
- Mystic Mountain

=== Historic ===
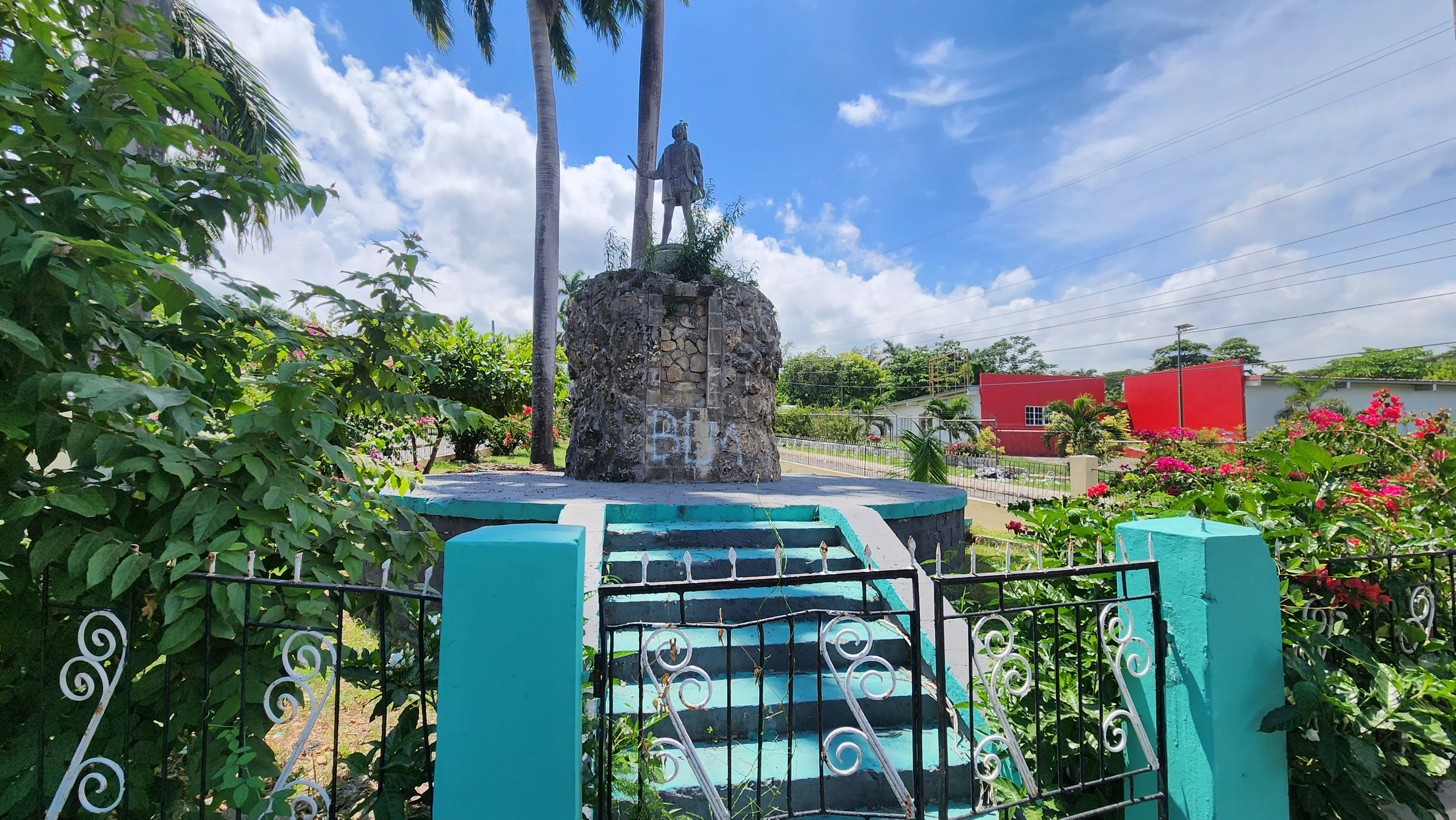
Statue of Christopher Columbus in St. Ann's Bay, Jamaica

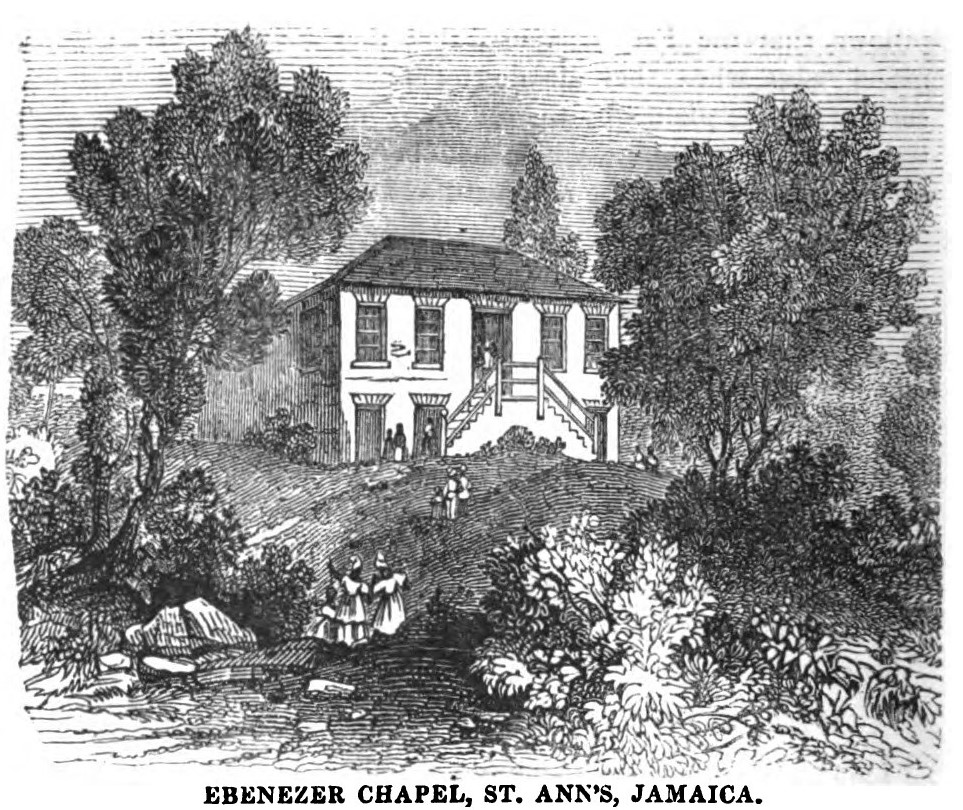
Ebenezer Chapel, Saint Ann's, Jamaica (September 1851, VIII, p. 102)

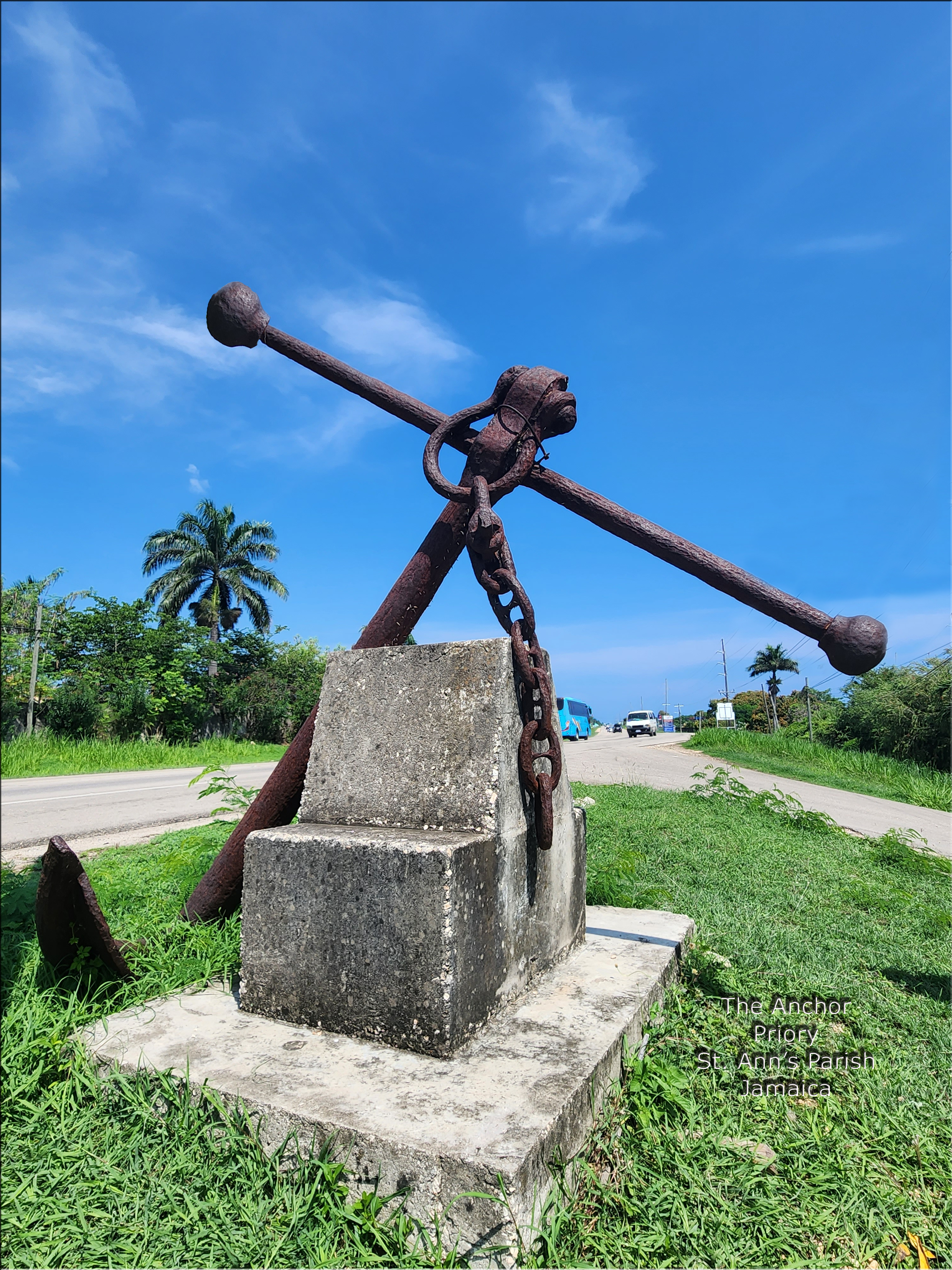
Anchor at Priory St Ann - recovered from HMS Hinchinbrook, Capt. Nelson's first command.

St. Ann's is a historically significant location that has undergone major development over the years. It was the site of Spanish settlement and civilization in Jamaica, and despite the capital being moved, it remains one of the most important parishes on the island. St. Ann is known for having the most free villages in Jamaica, including Clarksonville which was established in 1835. Originally a small market town and fishing village, St. Ann has evolved into a major player in Jamaica's Bauxite Industry. The parish is also known for its natural beauty and was named Santa Ana (St. Ann) by the Spaniards, earning the nickname "Garden Parish" of Jamaica.

The Parish has rich history, including being the location where Christopher Columbus first set foot in Jamaica on May 4, 1494 during his second voyage in the Americas. The British Man-O-War, the Hinchinbrook, previously commanded by then Post-Captain Horatio Nelson, also has ties to St. Ann's Parish. The ship was taking on water under the command of Lieutenant John Markham in 1782 soon after leaving Port Royal and sought shelter in St. Ann's Bay, but could not be coaxed over the reef and sank after a nearby schooner took some stores and a few cannons. The anchor of the Hinchinbrook was later retrieved and placed as a landmark in Priory. While many tour buses pass by the landmark on their way to Ocho Rios or Port Antonio, few may realize the significance of the old anchor and its ties to Jamaican history.

=== See also ===
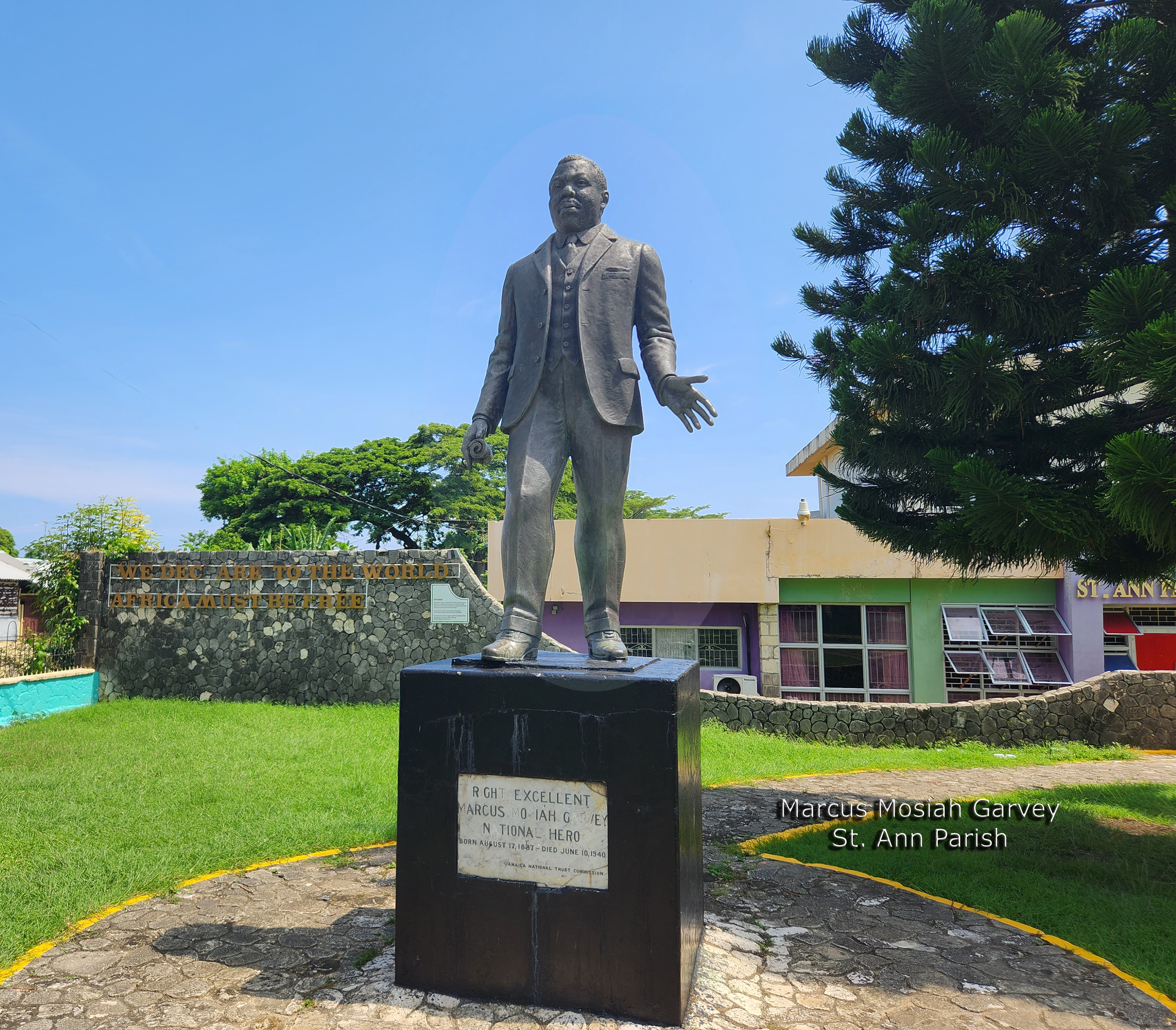
Marcus Garvey statue in front of the St. Ann Library

- Seville Heritage Park
- Bob Marley Mausoleum, Nine Mile
- Columbus Park
- Marcus Garvey Statue, Saint Ann's Bay
- Edinburgh Castle (ruins)
- Roaring River

== Notable persons ==
- Bob Marley
- Marcus Garvey
- Burning Spear
- Justin Hinds
- D.K. Duncan
- Peter Cargill
- Floyd Lloyd
- Jamaica national bobsled team
- Bass Odyssey
- Romain Virgo
- Donald J. Harris
- Shericka Jackson
