= Seville Heritage Park =

Historic place in Jamaica

The Seville Heritage Park was once an Indigenous Taíno village, 16th-century Spanish colonial settlement and a 17th-century British plantation, located in what is now Saint Ann Parish, Jamaica.

== Site description ==
The Heritage Park consists of 300 acres (1.2 km^{2}) of land on the northern coast of Jamaica. Prominent features of the park include:

1. Governor's Castle
2. Spanish Sugar Mill
3. Artesian Workshop
4. Spanish Settlement of Sevilla La Nueva
5. Spanish Church
6. British Great House

== World Heritage Status ==
This site was added to the UNESCO World Heritage Tentative List on March 2, 2009, in the Cultural category.
