= Floyd Lloyd =

Jamaican musician and singer

- Born: Lloyd Seivright; 3 June 1948; Brown's Town
- Origin: Saint Ann Parish, Jamaica
- Died: 6 November 2018 (aged 70)
- Genres: Reggae
- Instrument: Vocals

Floyd Lloyd (born Lloyd Seivright; 3 June 1948 in St. Ann, Jamaica – 6 November 2018) was a Jamaican reggae musician and singer who is best known for his 1982 hit, "Jah Jah Why?".

== Career ==
His first vocals were Wirl Studio recordings Rich Man Poor Man and Be Yourself in 1967.

His 1969 song "Be Yourself" led to him pursuing a career in the UK. In the early 1970s, he founded Tropic Entertainment & Recording Enterprises. In the 1970s, he formed the Red Cloud band. In 1977 Trojan Records released his songs "Soulful Lover Baby" and "Slow Down".

He later signed to KPM Music. Music he produced under KPM was used in EastEnders, Friends and Strange Days.

While performing with the ska revival group the Potato 5, he coined the phrase "mash it up."

After moving to New York in 1995, he re-released some of his material, in collaboration with his business partner Brenda Ray.

== Personal life ==
He moved to the Netherlands, before moving to New York in 1995. He died following an illness in the Saint Ann Parish hospital, Jamaica, on November 6, 2018.

== Discography ==
- Better To Laugh Than To Cry (1982)
- Tear It Up: The Ska Album (1997)
- Our World (1998)
- Alchemy (2001)
- Believer (2002)
- Mind Over Matter (2004)
