= Rebel Salute =

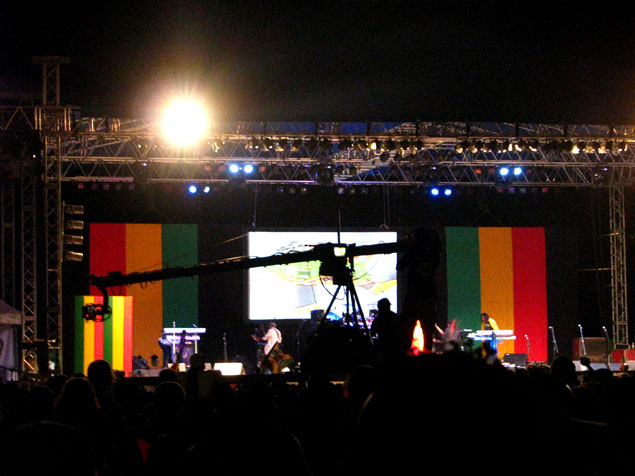
- Rebel Salute main stage
- Genre: Reggae, dancehall, etc.
- Dates: January 15 (+ extra day)
- Location: Jamaica
- Years active: 1994-present
- Website: Official website

Rebel Salute is an annual music festival held in Jamaica. It is held on January 15 of every year, the birthday of promoter Tony Rebel. It is one of Jamaica's biggest music festivals, known for its focus on roots and conscious music. Rebel began the festival in 1994 in the parish of Manchester and was long held annually in St. Elizabeth on the country's south coast until 2012. As of 2014, the festival is now a two-day event, held in the Richmond Park Estate in Saint Ann Parish.

The festival was billed as the Pepsi Rebel Salute during a three-year sponsorship agreement with PepsiCo. Festival producers stated they pursued the agreement as Pepsi products were more in-line with the festival's stance, which allows no alcohol and no meat. The festival has also featured dancehall performers not normally known for "conscious" lyrics by billing them under their birth name, rather than their stage name, to highlight their "good side", according to Tony Rebel.

== Gallery ==
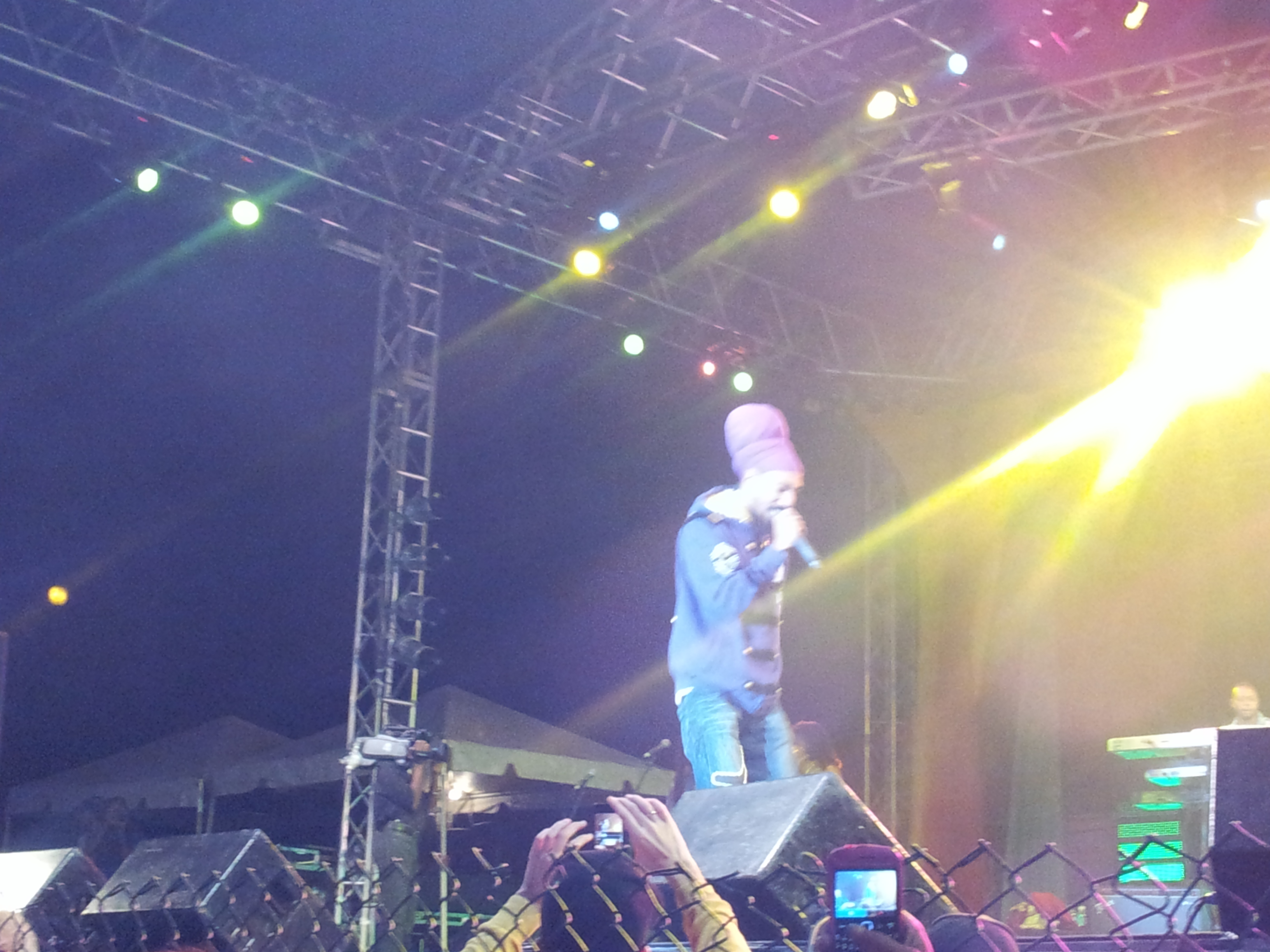
Cali P 2013

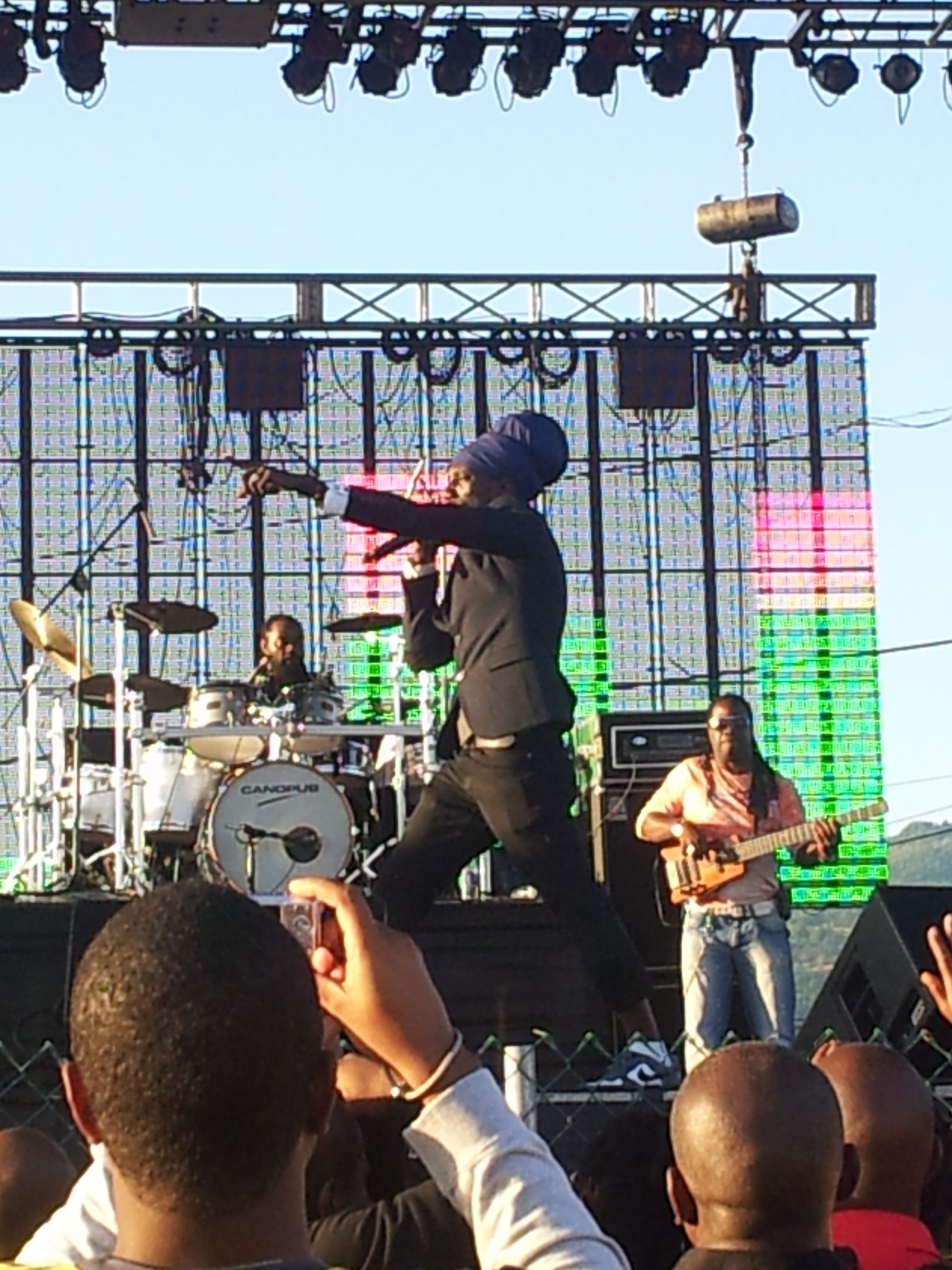
Sizzla 2013

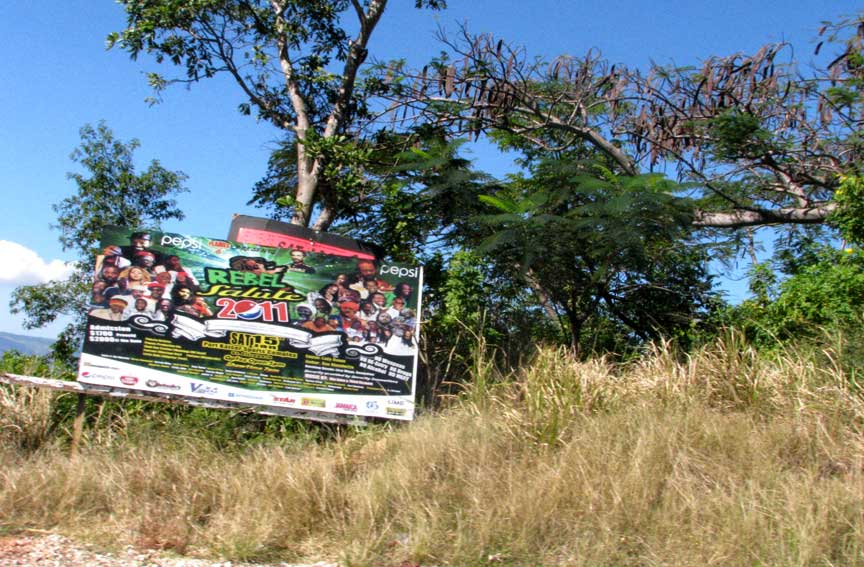
Rebel Salute 2011 sign

== See also ==
- List of reggae festivals
- Reggae
