= Saint Ann's Bay Old Jail =

Prison in Jamaica

- Interactive map of Saint Ann's Bay Old Jail
- Location: Saint Ann's Bay, Jamaica; 18.4386°N 77.1986°W
- Status: Closed
- Capacity: Unknown
- Opened: c. 1795
- Closed: Unknown

The Old Jail in Saint Ann's Bay is said to have been the very first prison in Jamaica. Built as a fort c. 1750, it was declared useless in 1795 as the sea was encroaching. It was then converted into a jail and house of correction. The jail had solitary cells, a treadmill, a separate room for lunatics, a room for debtors, a 'hospital', and a jailers' quarters. Many slaves died there.

== See also ==
- List of prisons in Jamaica
