= Sevilla la Nueva (Jamaica) =

Coordinates: 18.438°N 77.214°W

Location in Jamaica

Sevilla la Nueva or New Seville was the first permanent European settlement in Jamaica, the first capital of Jamaica and the third capital established by Spain in the Americas. It was founded in 1509 by Juan de Esquivel who arrived with 80 citizens and their families.

In 1518, due to health concerns arising from Sevilla la Nueva's proximity to a mangrove swamp, the settlement was moved to higher ground at a location which was only a short distance away from the first site. This settlement was known simply as Sevilla. The Spanish erected many buildings, including a monastery, a cathedral, and a theatre. In 1534, the town's population was largely relocated again, this time to Spanish Town (Villa de la Vega) on the south side of Jamaica. Unfavourable sanitary conditions and frequent raids from French filibusters have been attributed as the cause for Sevilla's gradual demise. A few inhabitants appear to have remained until 1554 when they were killed after French corsairs attacked the settlement.

Today, Seville Heritage Park stands in the site of the former settlement, preserving the ruins of its buildings and housing Taíno, Spanish and African artifacts in a dedicated museum.

== See also ==
- Seville Heritage Park
