= Afro-Jamaicans =

Racial or ethnic group in Jamaica

Affrɔ-Jumiekan (Jamaican Patois)
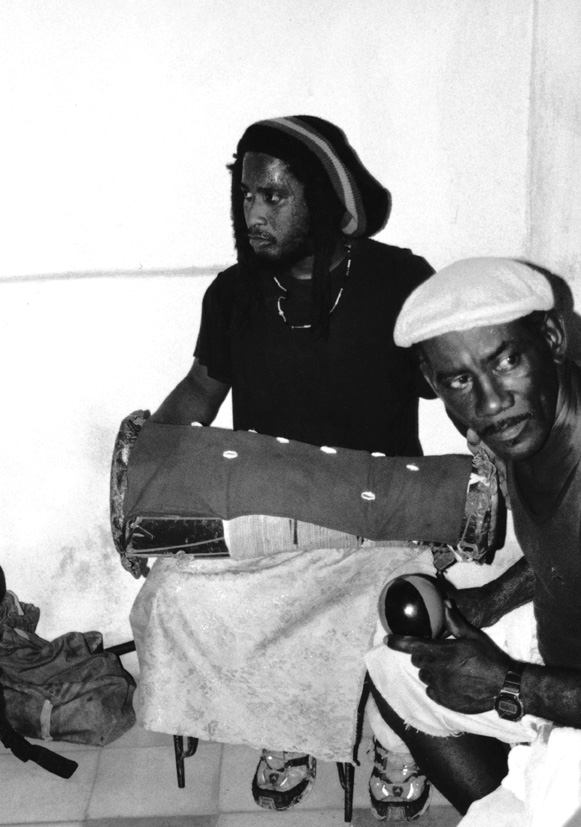
- Afro-Jamaican man playing the Bongo.

Total population
- 76.3% of Jamaica

Languages
- Jamaican English; Jamaican Patois

Religion
- Majority: Christianity; Minority: Rastafari • Irreligion • Others

Related ethnic groups
- African Caribbean • Akan • Afro–Trinidadians • British Jamaicans • Black Canadians • Jamaican Americans • Asante people • Igbo people

Afro-Jamaicans or Black Jamaicans are people from Jamaica who have ancestry from many of the African ethnic groups of Africa, whose ancestors were brought to the island from West and Central Africa through the transatlantic slave trade starting in the 16th century.

Afro-Jamaicans are Jamaicans of predominantly African descent. They represent the largest ethnic group in the country.

The ethnogenesis of the African Jamaican people stemmed from the Atlantic slave trade of the 16th century, when enslaved Africans were transported as slaves to Jamaica and other parts of the Americas. During the period of British rule, slaves brought to Jamaica by European slave traders were primarily from West Africa and Central Africa, some of whom ran away and joined with Jamaican Maroons and even took over as leaders.

== Origin ==
During the Atlantic slave trade, millions of people from West and Central Africa were enslaved and sold to European slave traders, primarily for transportation to the Americas. Most were captured in the frequent wars between African states, which were often fomented by the slave traders for this purpose, or were kidnapped in raids by African or European slavers directly.

After the abolition of slavery in the British West Indies, in 1834, free African labourers known as indentured labourers, came to Jamaica between 1834 and 1841, and 1841 and 1865—during the period of indentureship.

=== African Ethnicities ===
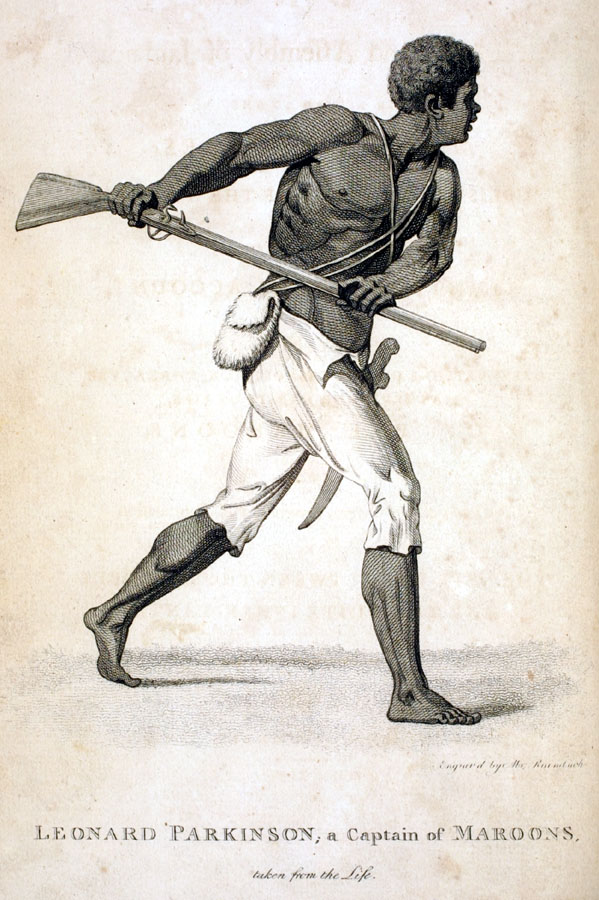
Leonard Parkinson, Jamaican Maroon leader (1796)

Based on slave ship records, enslaved Africans mostly came from the Akan people (notably those of the Asante Kotoko alliance of the 1720s: Asante, Bono, Wassa, Nzema and Ahanta) followed by the Igbo. Others belonged to the Bakongo, Gbe speakers (such as the Ewe and Fon people), Yoruba, and Ibibio. To a lesser extent, some slaves came from the Fulani, Temne, and Mande people (such as the Mende and Mandinka). Akan (then called Coromantee) culture was the dominant African culture in Jamaica.

Originally in earlier British colonization, the island before the 1750s was in fact mainly Akan imported. However, between 1663 and 1700, only six per cent of slave ships to Jamaica listed their origin as the Gold Coast, while between 1700 and 1720 that figure went up to 27 per cent. The number of Akan slaves arriving in Jamaica from Kormantin ports only increased in the early 18th century. But due to frequent rebellions from the then known "Coromantee" that often joined the slave rebellion group known as the Jamaican Maroons, other groups were sent to Jamaica. The Akan population was still maintained, since they were the preference of British planters in Jamaica because they were "better workers", according to these planters. According to the Slave Voyages Archives, though the Igbo had the highest importation numbers, they were only imported to Montego Bay and St. Ann's Bay ports, while the Akan (mainly Gold Coast) were more dispersed across the island and were a majority imported to seven of 14 of the island's ports (each parish has one port).

Following the abolition of slavery in Jamaica, African migration to the island continued through schemes of indentured and contract labour. Between 1837 and 1867, over 11,000 free Africans arrived in Jamaica to work on sugar estates. The Jamaican government and plantation interests sought additional workers after emancipation, particularly as many formerly enslaved Jamaicans left the plantations and established themselves as independent farmers or wage labourers. The earliest arrivals included 1,388 emancipados from Cuba between 1837 and 1839, followed by 10,003 contract labourers arriving between 1841 and 1867, beginning with 266 passengers aboard the ship Hector in 1841.

From the early 1840s, Africans liberated from slave ships by the British Royal Navy were recruited or transferred from Sierra Leone and St. Helena to the Caribbean as indentured labourers. These migrants were commonly referred to in colonial records as "Liberated Africans" or "recaptives". Although they had been freed from illegal transatlantic slave ships, many were subsequently placed under contracts requiring them to work in British Caribbean colonies. Historian David Eltis and colleagues estimate that Jamaica, British Guiana, and Trinidad received the great majority of Liberated Africans relocated during this period.

Historian Monica Schuler estimates that about 8,000 West and Central Africans entered Jamaica during this period, originating from various African societies. West African captives included Yoruba, Igbo, Kalabari, Nupe, Temne, Mende, and Mandinka, alongside populations from the Dahomey coast, Niger Delta, and Kru Coast. Central African captives included Kongo, Nsundi, Yaka, Ambaka, Bobangi, and Ndongo peoples. Among the arrivals was also a group of 60 Maroons from Sierra Leone—descendants of the Trelawny Town Maroons exiled to Nova Scotia and then Sierra Leone after the Second Maroon War—some of whom took the opportunity to return to Jamaica.

The migration was not uniform in character, and colonial recruiters faced widespread reluctance among Africans who feared the system represented another form of enslavement. To encourage emigration, colonial representatives hired "delegates"—respected local leaders and headmen—who were given free round trips to Jamaica and loaded with gifts and local produce, such as yams and coconuts, to demonstrate the island's fruitfulness to prospective migrants. In some instances, entire groups of youths were transported, including a shipload of 85 boys under 14 years of age from a Sierra Leone government school who were settled across estates in Hanover Parish. Overall, these recruitment efforts yielded limited success, leading authorities to rely more heavily on indentured labor from India.

Upon arrival, indentured Africans were widely distributed across Jamaican parishes, though large groups were often concentrated on specific estates. Kru Coast laborers in the Plantain Garden River Valley of St. Thomas, for instance, provided the primary labor for building the Morant Point Lighthouse. Initially, newly arrived Africans mixed very little with native-born Creoles, maintaining closer ties among themselves or with older African-born residents. After completing their contracts, most were denied return passage to Africa and remained in Jamaica; many moved off the estates to establish independent villages, such as Rhine (near Bath, St. Thomas) on land acquired by George William Gordon.

Post-emancipation African immigrants significantly expanded Afro-Jamaican religious and cultural traditions. Yoruba captives who settled in Westmoreland Parish established the village of Abeokuta, while post-emancipation arrivals in Hanover Parish contributed to the development of the Etu tradition. Central African captives, particularly the Kongos region, played a pivotal role in establishing Kumina, an African-derived Jamaican religious tradition centered largely in St. Thomas Parish. These 19th-century arrivals added a distinct, later layer of African ancestry and cultural influence to a population whose roots had been established during the transatlantic slave trade.

=== Afro-European ===
The majority of the house slaves were mulattoes. There were also Brown/Mulatto or mixed-race people at the time who had more privileges than the African slaves and usually held higher-paying jobs and occupations.

In 1871 the census recorded a population of 506,154 people, 246,573 males, and 259,581 females. Their races were recorded as 13,101 White, 100,346 "Coloured," and 392,707 Black.

== History ==
=== Atlantic slave trade ===
Region of embarkment, 1701–1800	Amount %
Bight of Biafra (Igbo, Ibibio)	31.9
Gold Coast (Asante-Akan)	29.5
West-central Africa (Kongo, Mbundu)	15.2
Bight of Benin (Yoruba, Ewe, Fon, Allada and Mahi)	10.1
Windward Coast (Mandé, Kru)	4.8
Sierra Leone (Mende, Temne)	3.8
Southeast Africa (Macua, Malagasy)	0.1
(Unknown)	5.0

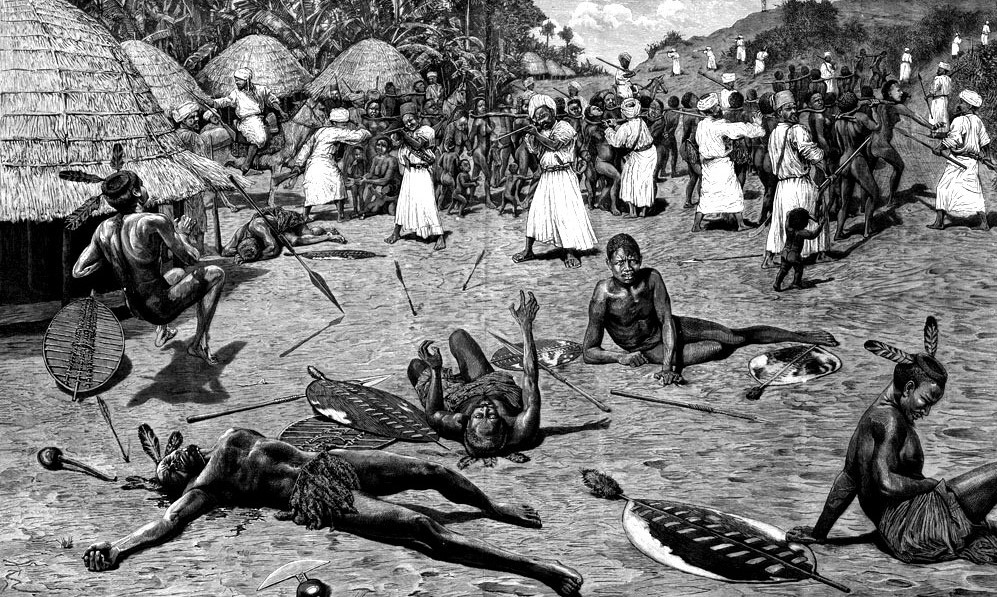
Slave raiding in Africa village

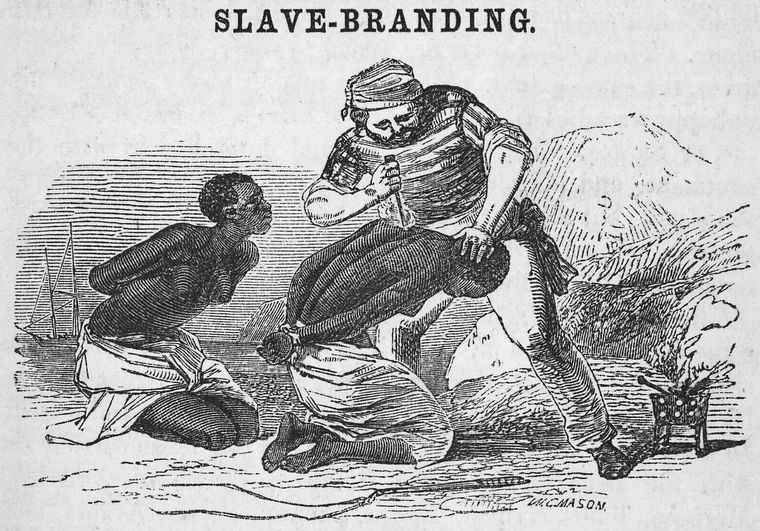
Slave branding

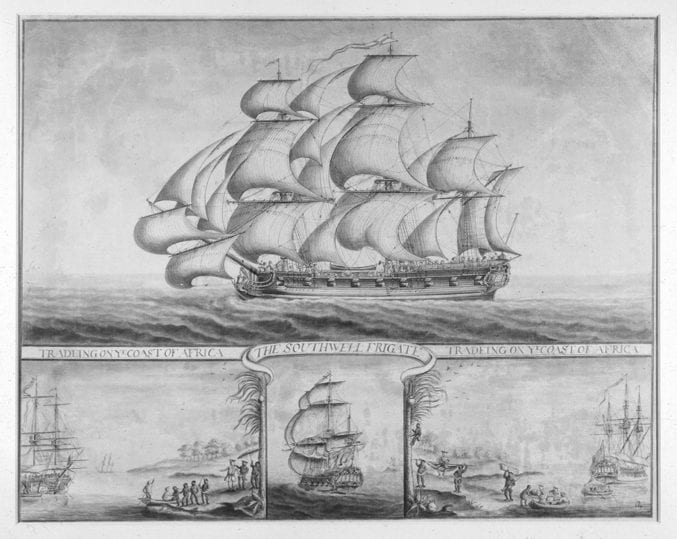
The Southwell Frigate, slave ship that delivered 629 enslaved Africans to Jamaica in 1746

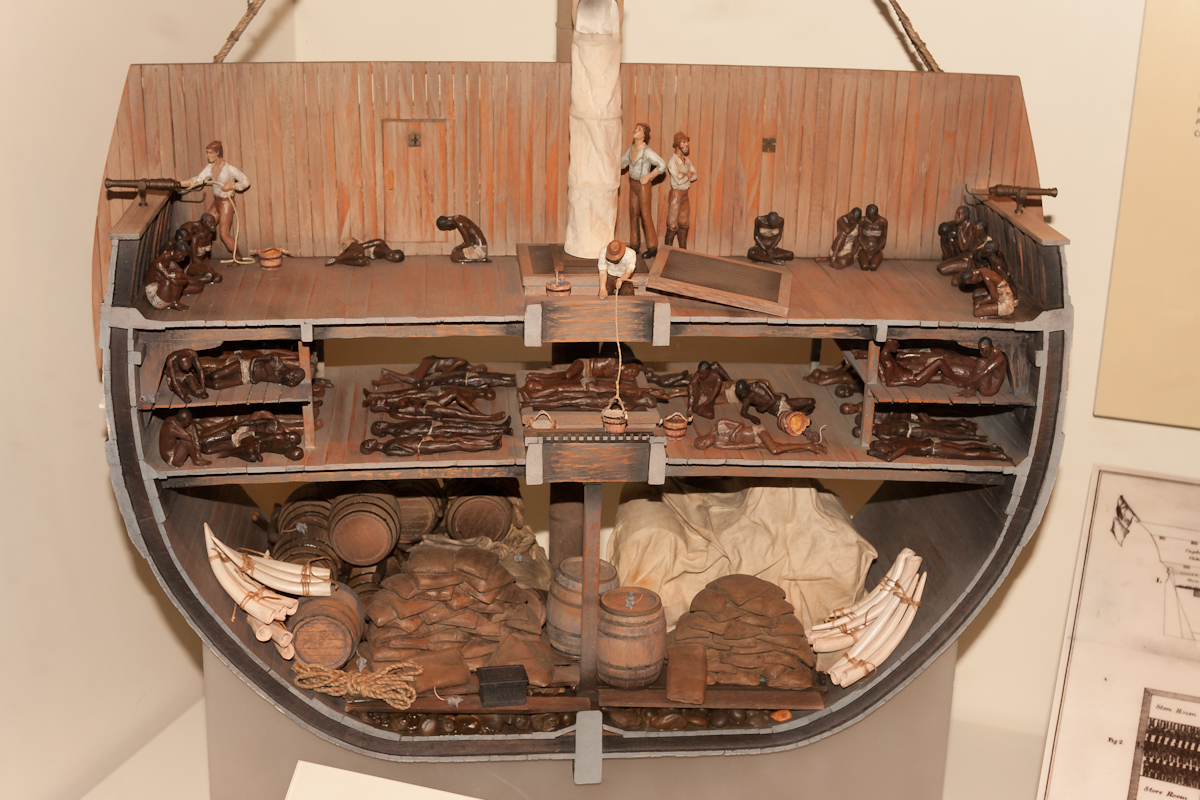
Slave ship model

=== Plantation economy ===
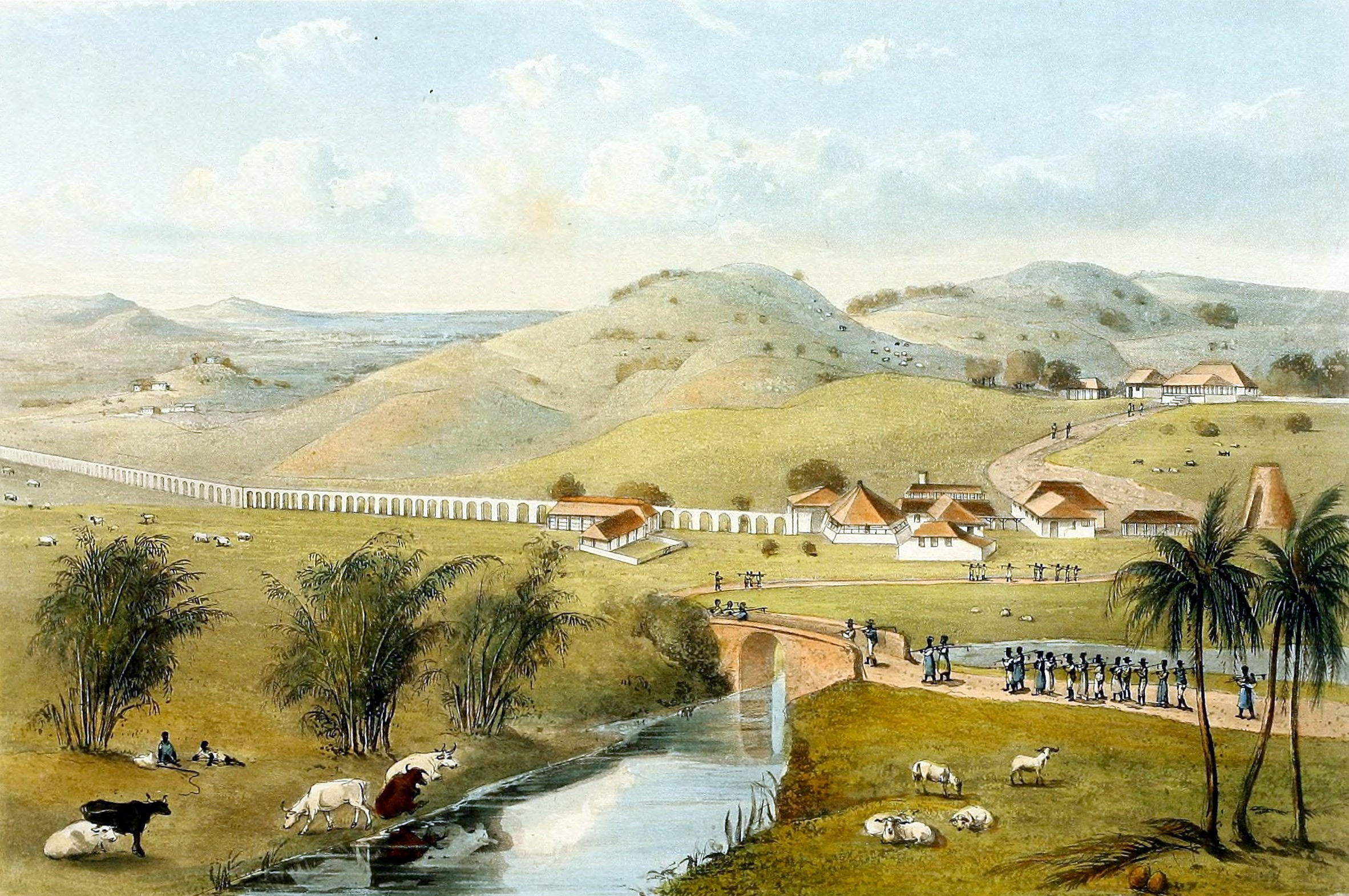
Trinity Estate in 1820.

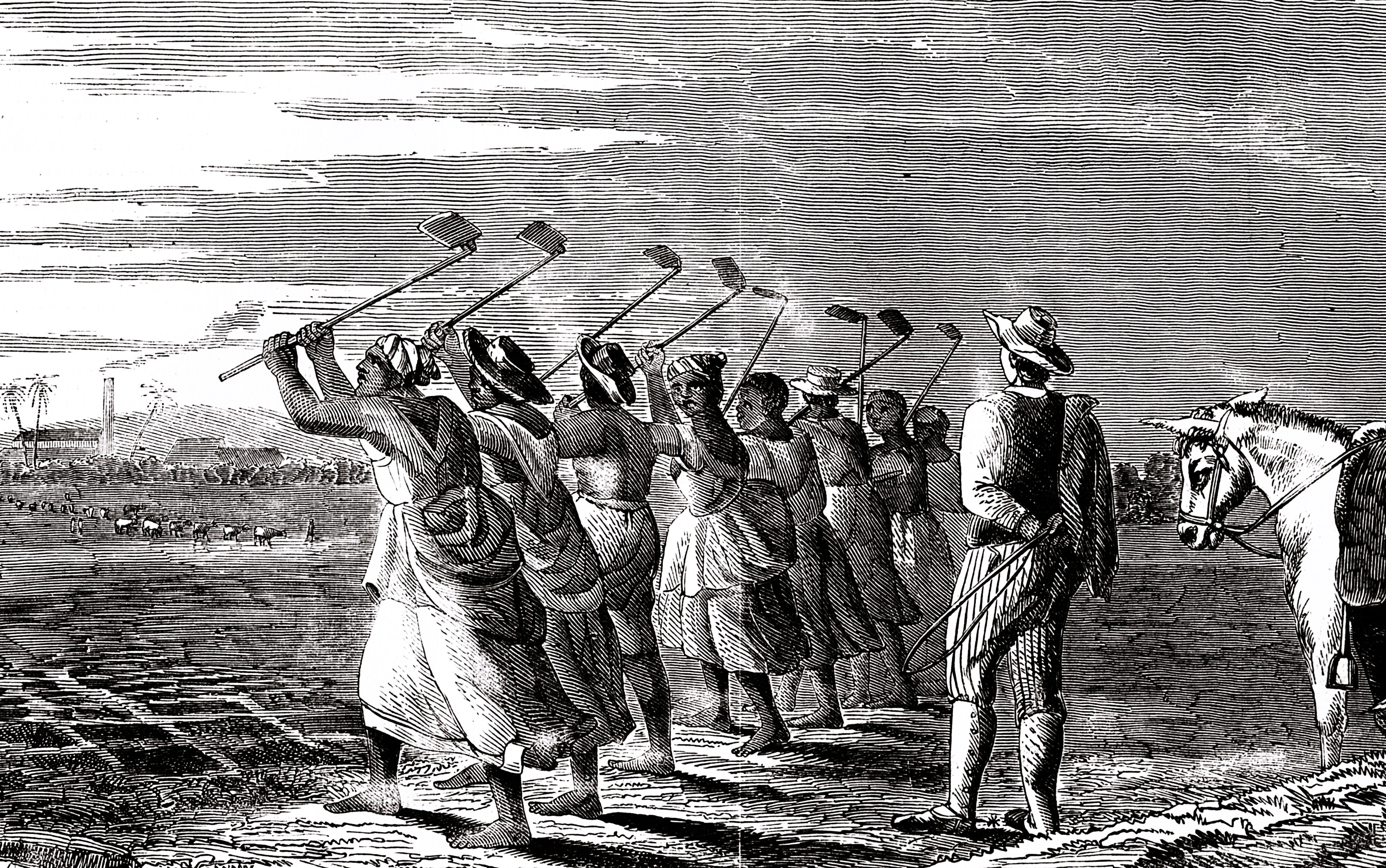
Cane holeing, in a Jamaican plantation.

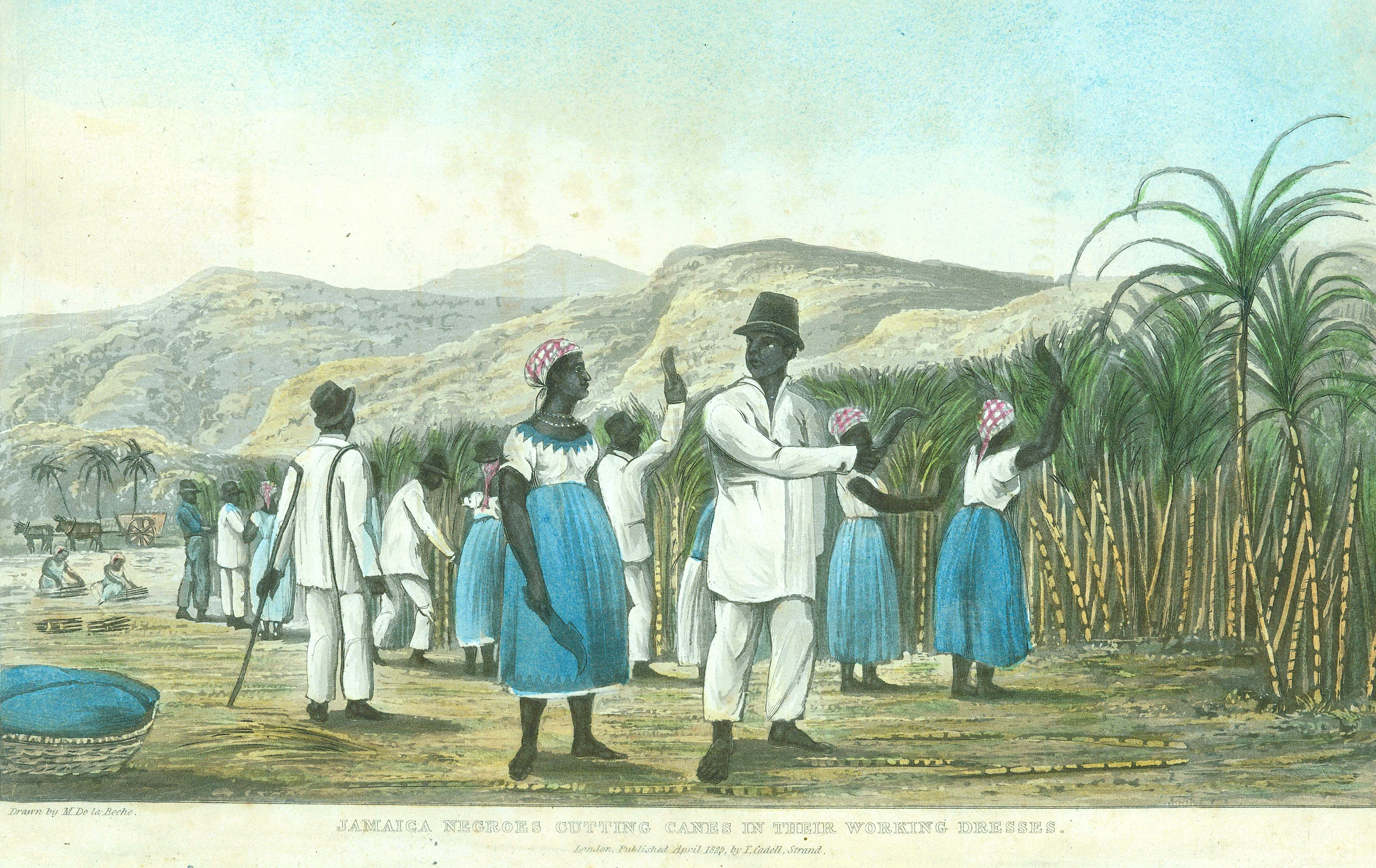
Idealised version of plantation life (in the image, slaves are cutting sugar cane with a relaxed demeanor)

=== Rebellions ===
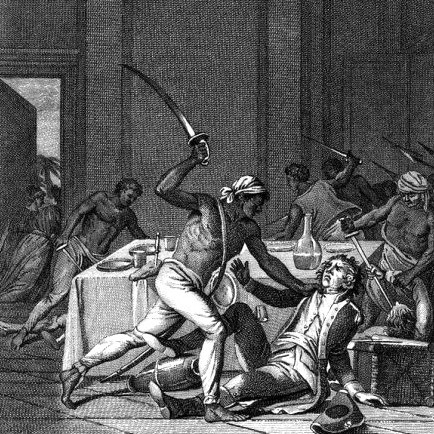
Tacky's Revolt in 1760

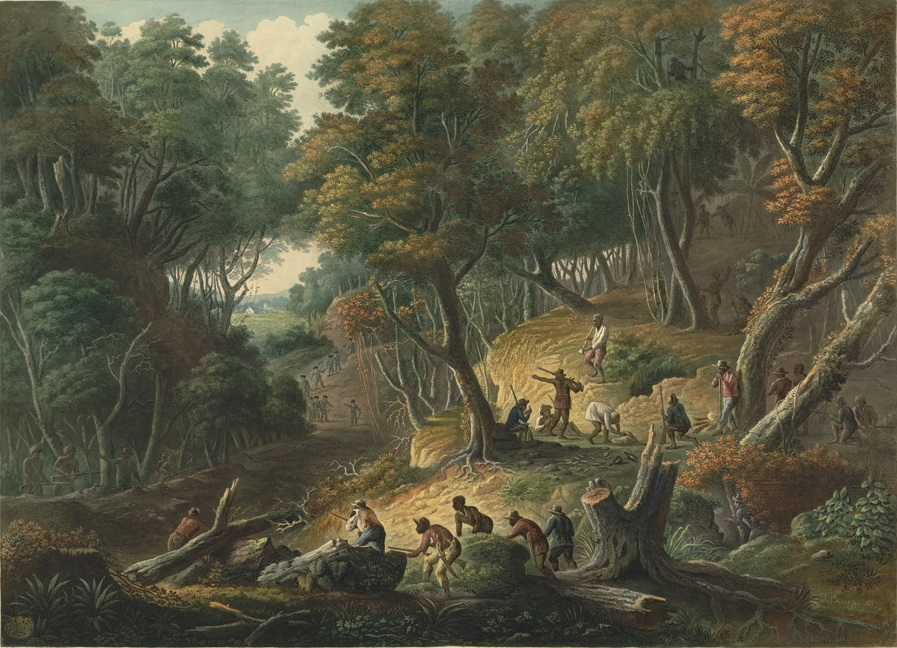
Jamaican Maroon in ambush on the Dromilly Estate in the Parish Of Trelawney during Second Maroon War in 1795

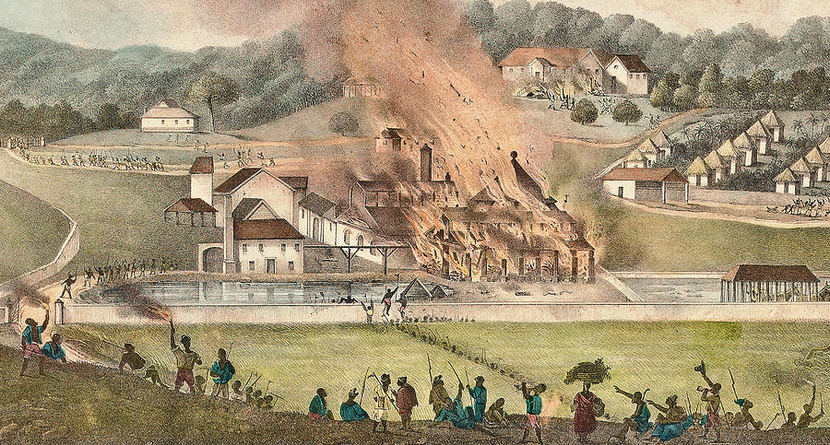
Baptist War in 1831-32

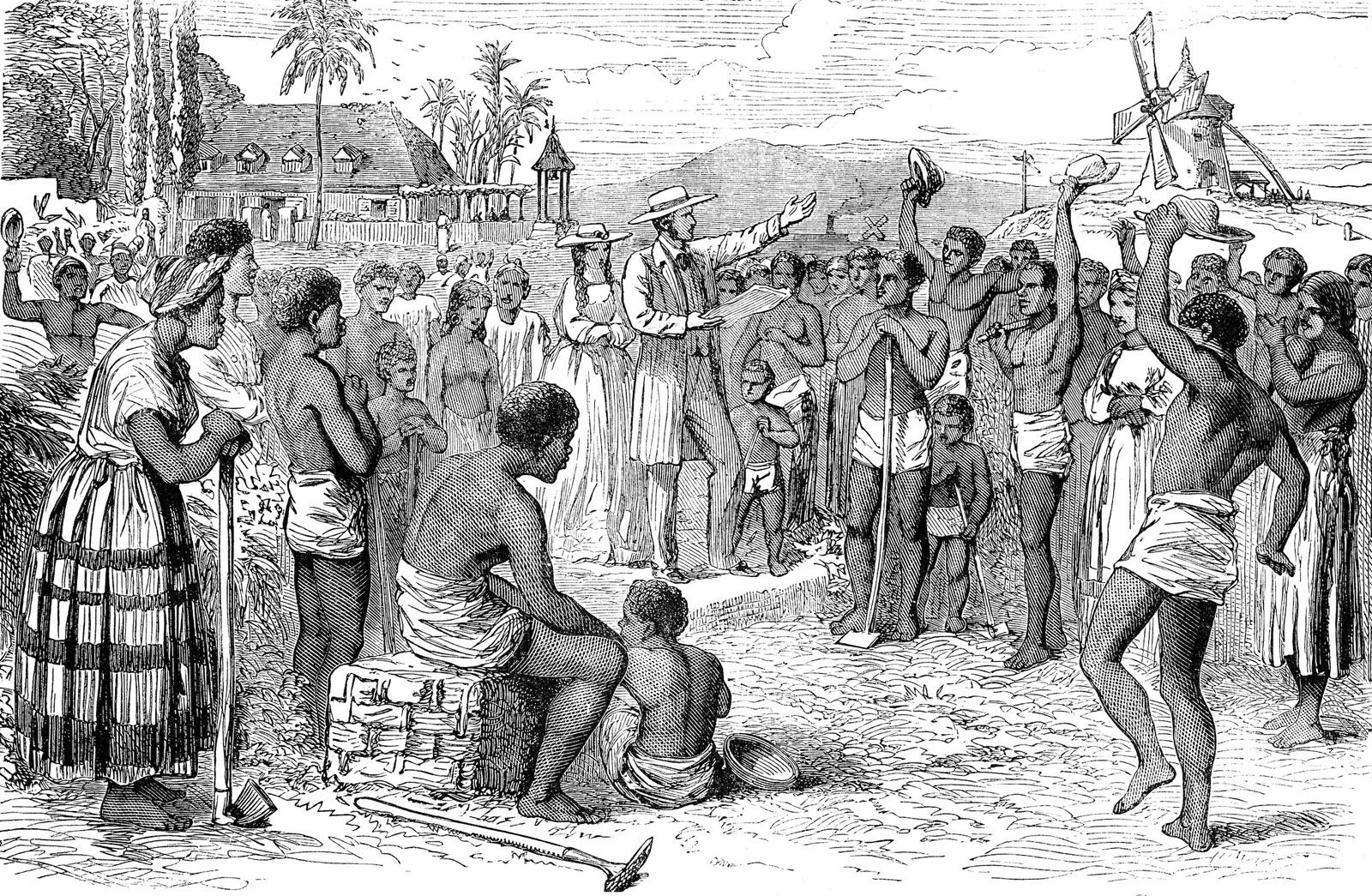
Slaves on a British plantation in the West Indies receiving news of their emancipation following the passage of the Slavery Abolition Act of 1833 following slave revolts.

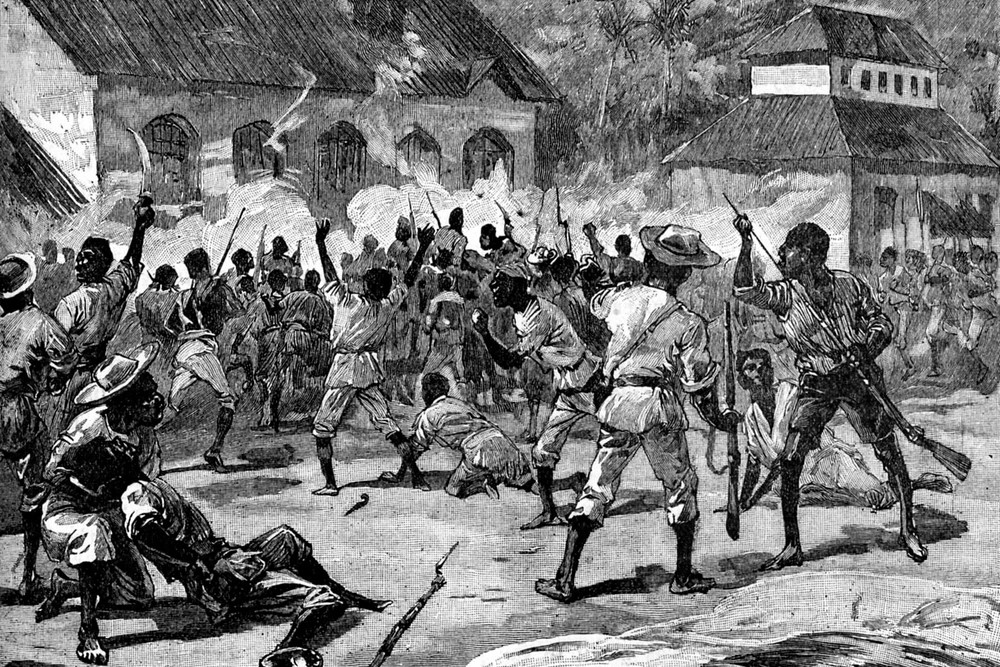
The Morant Bay rebellion in 1865

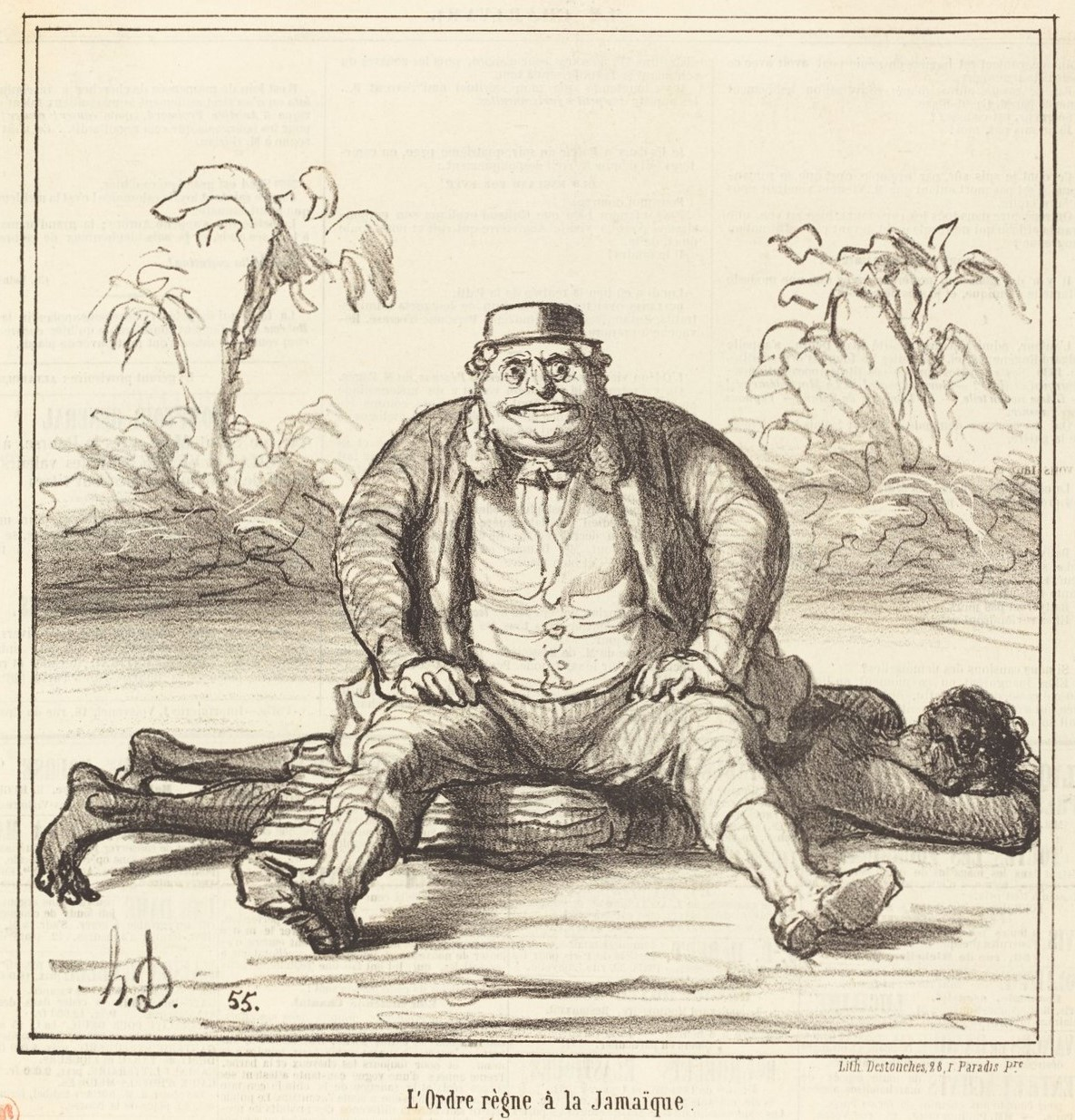
1866 lithography by French cartoonist Honoré Daumier showing British Governor John Peter Grant establishing his authority following the Morant Bay Rebellion

== Culture ==
=== Myal and Revival ===
Kumfu (from the word Akom the name of the Akan spiritual system) was documented as Myal and originally only found in books, while the term Kumfu is still used by Jamaican Maroons. The priest of Kumfu was called a Kumfu-man. In 18th-century Jamaica, only Akan gods were worshipped by Akan as well as by other enslaved Africans. The Akan god of creation, Nyankopong was given praise but not worshipped directly. They poured libation to Asase Ya, the goddess of the earth. But nowadays they are only observed by the Maroons who preserved a lot of the culture of 1700s Jamaica.

"Myal" or Kumfu evolved into Revival, a syncretic Christian sect. Kumfu followers gravitated to the American Revival of 1800 Seventh Day Adventist movement because it observed Saturday as god's day of rest. This was a shared aboriginal belief of the Akan people as this too was the day that the Akan god, Nyame, rested after creating the earth. Jamaicans that were aware of their Ashanti past while wanting to keep hidden, mixed their Kumfu spirituality with the American Adventists to create Jamaican Revival in 1860. Revival has two sects: 60 order (or Zion Revival, the order of the heavens) and 61 order (or Pocomania, the order of the earth). 60 order worships God and spirits of air or the heavens on a Saturday and considers itself to be the more "clean" sect. 61 order more deals with spirits of the earth. This division of Kumfu clearly shows the dichotomy of Nyame and Asase Yaa's relationship, Nyame representing air and has his 60 order'; Asase Yaa having her 61 order of the earth. Also the Ashanti funerary/war colours: red and black have the same meaning in Revival of vengeance. Other Ashanti elements include the use of swords and rings as means to guard the spirit from spiritual attack. The Asantehene, like the Mother Woman of Revival, has special two swords used to protect himself from witchcraft called an Akrafena or soul sword and a Bosomfena or spirit sword.

=== John Canoe ===
A festival was dedicated to the heroism of the Akan king 'John Canoe' an Ahanta from Axim, Ghana, in 1708. See John Canoe section.

=== Jamaican Patois ===
Jamaican Patois, known locally as Patwa, is an English creole language spoken primarily in Jamaica and the Jamaican diaspora. It is not to be confused with Jamaican English nor with the Rastafarian use of English. The language developed in the 17th century, when enslaved peoples from West and Central Africa blended their dialect and terms with the learned vernacular and dialectal forms of English spoken: British Englishes (including significant exposure to Scottish English) and Hiberno English. Jamaican Patwa is a post-creole speech continuum (a linguistic continuum) meaning that the variety of the language closest to the lexifier language (the acrolect) cannot be distinguished systematically from intermediate varieties (collectively referred to as the mesolect) nor even from the most divergent rural varieties (collectively referred to as the basilect). Jamaicans themselves usually refer to their use of English as patwa, a term without a precise linguistic definition.

Jamaican Patois contains many loanwords of African origin, a majority of those etymologically from Gold Coast region (particularly of the Asante-Twi dialect of the Akan language of Ghana).

=== Proverbs ===
Most Jamaican proverbs are of Asante people, while some included other African proverbs.

== Genetic studies ==
=== Jamaican mtDNA ===
A DNA test study submitted to BMC Medicine in 2012 states that "....despite the historical evidence that an overwhelming majority of slaves were sent from the Bight of Biafra and West-central Africa near the end of the British slave trade, the mtDNA haplogroup profile of modern Jamaicans show a greater affinity with groups found in the present-day Gold Coast region Ghana....this is because Africans arriving from the Gold Coast may have thus found the acclimatization and acculturation process less stressful because of cultural and linguistic commonalities, leading ultimately to a greater chance of survivorship and a greater number of progeny."

More detailed results stated: "Using haplogroup distributions to calculate parental population contribution, the largest admixture coefficient was associated with the Gold Coast with most of the samples taken from the Asante-Akyem area of the Ashanti region of Ghana(0.477 ± 0.12 or 59.7% of the Jamaican population with a 2.7 chance of Pygmy and Sahelian mixture), suggesting that the people from this region may have been consistently prolific throughout the slave era on Jamaica. Modern day Jamaicans and the Asante people, both share the MTDNA haplogroup of L2a1. The diminutive admixture coefficients associated with the Bight of Biafra and West-central Africa (0.064 ± 0.05 and 0.089 ± 0.05, respectively) is striking considering the massive influx of individuals from these areas in the waning years of the British Slave trade. When excluding the pygmy groups, the contribution from the Bight of Biafra and West-central rise to their highest levels (0.095 ± 0.08 and 0.109 ± 0.06, respectively), though still far from a major contribution. When admixture coefficients were calculated by assessing shared haplotypes, the Gold Coast also had the largest contribution, though much less striking at 0.196, with a 95% confidence interval of 0.189 to 0.203. When haplotypes are allowed to differ by one base pair, the Jamaican matriline shows the greatest affinity with the Bight of Benin, though both Bight of Biafra and West-central Africa remain underrepresented. The results of the admixture analysis suggest the mtDNA haplogroup profile distribution of Jamaica more closely resembles that of aggregated populations from the modern-day Gold Coast region despite an increasing influx of individuals from both the Bight of Biafra and West-central Africa during the final years of trading enslaved Africans.

The aforementioned results apply to subjects who have been tested. Results also stated that black Jamaicans (that make up more than 90% of the population) on an average have 97.5% of African MtDNA and very little European or Asian ancestry could be found. Both ethnic and racial genetic results are based on a low sample of 390 Jamaican persons and limited regional representation within Jamaica. As Afro-Jamaicans are not genetically homogeneous, the results for other subjects may yield different results.

=== Jamaican Y-DNA ===
Pub Med results were also issued in the same year (2012): "Our results reveal that the studied population of Jamaica exhibit a predominantly South-Saharan paternal component, with haplogroups A1b-V152, A3-M32, B2-M182, E1a-M33, E1b1a-M2, E2b-M98, and R1b2-V88 comprising 66.7% of the Jamaican paternal gene pool. Yet, European derived chromosomes (i.e., haplogroups G2a*-P15, I-M258, R1b1b-M269, and T-M184) were detected at commensurate levels in Jamaica (19.0%), whereas Y-haplogroups indicative of Chinese [O-M175 (3.8%)] and Indian [H-M69 (0.6%) and L-M20 (0.6%)] ancestry were restricted to Jamaica. African paternal DNA 66.7% European paternal DNA 19.0% Chinese paternal DNA 3.8% Indian paternal DNA 1.2%

=== Jamaican autosomal DNA ===
The gene pool of Jamaica is about 80.3% Sub-Saharan African, 10% European, and 5.7% East Asian; according to a 2010 autosomal genealogical DNA testing.

== Notable Afro-Jamaicans ==
- Agent Sasco
- Aleen Bailey
- Alex Marshall
- Alia Atkinson
- Alton Ellis
- Alvas Powell
- Andre Blake
- Asafa Powell
- Arthur Wint
- Beenie Man
- Beres Hammond
- Big Youth
- Billy Strachan
- Black Uhuru
- Bob Andy
- Bob Marley (Afro-Jamaican mother)
- Bounty Killer
- Brigitte Foster-Hylton
- Buju Banton
- Bunny Wailer
- Burning Spear
- Capleton
- Cedella Marley
- Chalice
- Chavany Willis
- Chris Gayle
- Chronixx
- Claude McKay
- Colorado Murray
- Cory Burke
- Courtney Walsh
- Coxsone Dodd
- Danny McFarlane
- Dean Fraser
- Delloreen Ennis-London
- Deon Hemmings
- DJ Kool Herc
- Damion Lowe
- Danny Ray
- Darren Mattocks
- Demar Phillips
- Deneisha Blackwood
- Dennis Brown
- Deshorn Brown
- Desmond Dekker
- Dever Orgill
- Devon Williams
- Don Quarrie
- Donovan Ruddock
- Dujuan Richards
- Elaine Thompson
- Emily Maddison
- Ferdinand Smith
- Freddie McGregor
- Grace Jones
- George Headley
- Gregory Isaacs
- I Wayne
- Inner Circle
- Jamoi Topey
- Javain Brown
- Jimmy Adams
- Jimmy Cliff
- Joseph Hill
- Jourdaine Fletcher
- Judith Mowatt
- Julian Forte
- Julian Marley
- Juliet Cuthbert
- Juliet Holness
- Junior Morias
- Hansle Parchment
- Hazel Monteith
- Heather Little-White
- Herb McKenley
- J'ai Venait
- Keithy Simpson
- Kemar Lawrence
- Kerron Stewart
- Khadija Shaw
- Khari Stephenson
- Kymani Marley
- Koffee
- Kofi Cockburn
- Konya Plummer
- Ladale Richie
- Lamar Walker
- Lee "Scratch" Perry
- Leon Bailey
- Louise Bennett
- Madge Sinclair
- Marcia Griffiths
- Marcus Garvey
- Marion Hall
- Melaine Walker
- Merlene Ottey
- Mike McCallum
- Millie Small
- Morgan Heritage
- Mustard
- Queen Nanny
- Nester Carter
- Nickel Ashmeade
- Nkrumah Bonner
- Novlene Williams
- Onandi Lowe
- Owayne Gordon
- P.J. Patterson
- Patrick Ewing
- Paul Bogle
- Paula Llewellyn
- Pepa
- Peter Tosh
- Peter-Lee Vassell
- Portia Simpson-Miller
- Rasheed Broadbell
- Rasheed Dwyer
- Raheem Sterling
- Renaldo Cephas
- Ricardo Fuller
- Ricardo Gardner
- Ricardo Thomas
- Richard King
- Rimario Gordon
- Rita Marley
- Robin Fraser
- Rojé Stona
- Rohan Marley
- Rolando Aarons
- Romain Virgo
- Romario Williams
- Rosemarie Whyte
- Sanya Richards-Ross
- Samuel Sharpe
- Shabba Ranks
- Shaggy
- Shamar Nicholson
- Sheri-Ann Brooks
- Sherone Simpson
- Shelly-Ann Fraser
- Shericka Jackson
- Simone Facey
- Steven Marley
- Theodore Whitmore
- Third World
- Toots Hibbert
- Trevor D. Rhone
- Trivante Stewart
- Usain Bolt
- Veronica Campbell
- Vybz Kartel
- Yohan Blake
- Zavon Hines
- Ziggy Marley

== Notable people with Afro-Jamaican ancestry ==
- Aaliyah (Jamaican paternal grandparents)
- Adrian Mariappa (Jamaican mother)
- Ainsley Maitland-Niles (Jamaican parents)
- Akala (Jamaican father)
- Al Roker (Jamaican mother)
- Aljamain Sterling (Jamaican parents)
- Ashley Thomas (Jamaican mother)
- Aml Ameen (has both Jamaican and Vincentian parentage)
- Andre Wisdom (Jamaican parents)
- Ayesha Curry (Jamaican mother)
- Benjamin Zephaniah (Jamaican mother)
- Bobby De Cordova-Reid (Jamaican parents)
- Bobby Shmurda (Jamaican father)
- Brandon Clarke (Jamaican father)
- Busta Rhymes (Jamaican parents)
- Carl Lumbly (Jamaican parents)
- Capital Steez (Jamaican parents)
- Cheyna Matthews (Jamaican father)
- Chinyelu Asher (Jamaican father)
- Christopher Reid (Jamaican father)
- Colin Powell (Jamaican parents of mixed African and Scottish ancestry)
- Corbin Bleu (Jamaican father)
- Craig Eastmond (Jamaican parents)
- Daniel Caesar (Jamaican father)
- Danny Gabbidon (Jamaican father)
- Darius Vassell (Jamaican parents)
- Deanne Rose (Jamaican parents)
- Delroy Lindo (Jamaican parents)
- Demarai Gray (Jamaican parents)
- Derek Cornelius (Jamaican mother)
- Dexter Lembikisa (Jamaican mother)
- Dina Asher-Smith (Jamaican parents)
- Dorothy Dandridge (Jamaican maternal grandfather)
- Dujon Sterling (Jamaican parents)
- Dulé Hill (Jamaican parents)
- Ella Mai (Jamaican mother)
- Errol Spence Jr. (Jamaican father)
- FKA Twigs (Jamaican father)
- Floyd Mayweather Jr. (Jamaican grandmother)
- Frank Bruno (Jamaican mother)
- Gabrielle Thomas (Jamaican father)
- Garath McCleary (Jamaican father)
- Gil Scott-Heron (Jamaican father)
- Gramps Morgan (Jamaican parents)
- Heavy D (Jamaican parents)
- Ian Wright (Jamaican parents)
- Isaac Hayden (Jamaican mother)
- Jamal Lowe (Jamaican parents)
- Jamelia (Jamaican parents)
- Jermaine Beckford (Jamaican father)
- Jobi McAnuff (Jamaican father)
- Jodie Turner-Smith (Jamaican parents)
- Joey Badass (Jamaican father)
- John Barnes (Jamaican mother)
- Judi Love (Jamaican parents)
- Justin McMaster (Jamaican parents)
- Justine Skye (Jamaican parents)
- Justin Jude Clarke-Samuel (has both Jamaican and Grenadian parentage)
- Kamie Crawford (Jamaican mother)
- Kamala Harris (Jamaican father)
- Kane Robinson (Jamaican parents)
- Kasey Palmer (Jamaican parents)
- Kerry Washington (Jamaican mother)
- Kevin Lisbie (Jamaican parents)
- Kevin Michael Richardson (Jamaican parents)
- Khalil Madovi (Jamaican mother)
- Lamont Bryan (Jamaican mother)
- Lani Guinier (Jamaican father)
- Leomie Anderson (Jamaican parents)
- Lennox Lewis (Jamaican parents)
- Mark-Anthony Kaye (Jamaican parents)
- Mason Greenwood (Jamaican mother)
- Melvin Brown (Jamaican paternal grandfather)
- Michael Hector (Jamaican father)
- Michael Ward (Jamaican parents)
- Mike Tyson (Jamaican father)
- Mo Gilligan (has both Jamaican and St. Lucian parentage)
- Musashi Suzuki (Jamaican father)
- Mustard (record producer) (Jamaican parents)
- Nicholas Pinnock (Jamaican parents)
- NLE Choppa (Jamaican mother)
- Naomi Campbell (Jamaican parents)
- Nathaniel Adamolekun (Jamaican mother)
- Nathaniel Mendez-Laing (Jamaican father)
- Ndamukong Suh (Jamaican mother)
- Olivia Olson (Jamaican father)
- Olufolasade Adamolekun (Jamaican mother)
- Patrick Ewing Jr. (Jamaican parents)
- Pete Rock (Jamaican parents)
- Pete Wentz (mixed Jamaican mother)
- Pop Smoke (Jamaican mother)
- Rachelle Smith (Jamaican parents)
- Roy Hibbert (Jamaican father)
- Safaree Samuels (Jamaican parents)
- Sean Johnson (Jamaican Father)
- Sean Kingston (Jamaican parents)
- Shane Paul McGhie (Jamaican father)
- Shameik Moore (Jamaican parents)
- Sheryl Lee Ralph (Jamaican parents)
- Simeon Jackson (Jamaican parents)
- Slick Rick (Jamaican parents)
- Sol Campbell (Jamaican parents)
- Styles P (Jamaican father)
- Tajon Buchanan (Jamaican parents)
- Tayvon Gray (Jamaican parents)
- The Notorious B.I.G. (Jamaican parents)
- Tristan Thompson (Jamaican parents)
- Tyga (Jamaican father)
- Tyson Beckford (Jamaican parents)
- Uncle Luke (Jamaican father)
- Wes Morgan (Jamaican parents)
- Winnie Harlow (Jamaican parents)
- Wilbert Charles Johnson (Jamaican parents)
- XXXTentacion (Jamaican parents)
- Yazmeen Jamieson (Jamaican father)

== See also ==
- Coromantee
- Dancehall
- Dub music
- Jonkanoo
- Mento
- Old school jungle
- Passa Passa
- Reggae
- Rocksteady
- Ska
