= Teacha Dee =

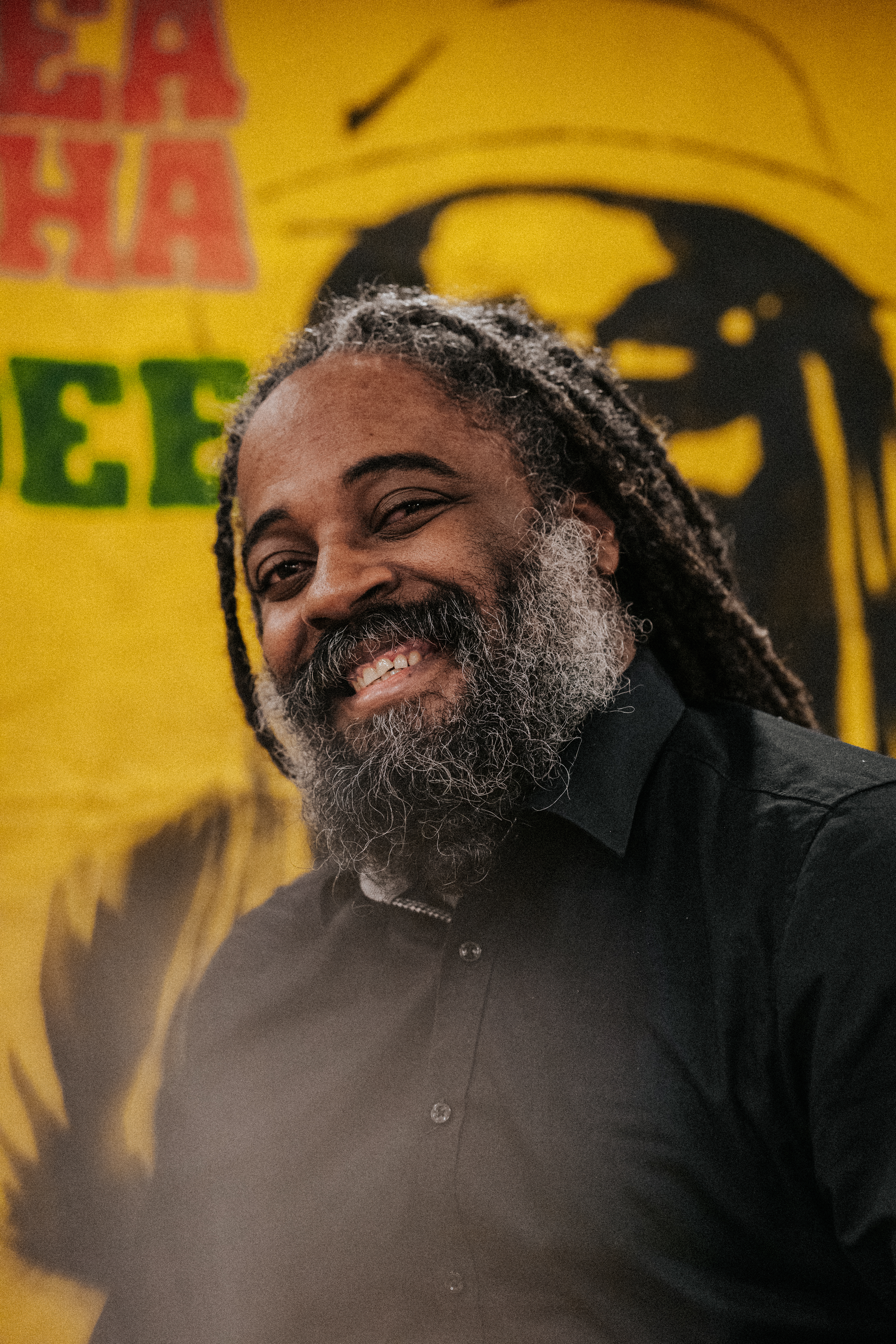
- Teacha Dee, 2021 (Deutschland)

Background information
- Also known as: Teach, Teacha Dee, Teacher Dee, Teacha D
- Born: Damion Darrel Warren; 21 September 1980 (age 45)
- Origin: Westmoreland, Jamaica
- Genres: Reggae, dancehall, reggae fusion, roots reggae
- Occupations: Musician, Songwriter, deejay, Producer, Educator
- Instruments: Keyboard, Bass Guitar
- Years active: Late 2005–present
- Labels: Tenfloor Records, Giddimani Records, House Of Riddim
- Website: Teacha Dee

Damion Darrel Warren (born 21 September 1980), best known as Teacha Dee, is a Jamaican reggae singer and former educator. He is best known for his hit singles "Smoke and Fly", "Reggae Souljahs" and "Smuggling Weed". He was a full-time employee for the Ministry of Education Youth and Culture in Jamaica when he recorded all three songs. His stage name was derived from the Jamaican creole for "teacher" and a shortening of his childhood nickname "Demus".

== Early life and education ==
Warren was born on 21 September 1980 in Westmoreland, Jamaica. He grew up in a little district called Bath where he attended the Unity Primary School. Being successful in his Common Entrance Exams, he was rewarded a place at the prestigious Manning's School from which he graduated in 1997 before relocating to Montego Bay to live with his mother. Warren then attended the Sam Sharpe Teachers College, where he attained a diploma in education at the secondary level.

== Teaching career ==
In September 2000, Warren was employed by the Ministry of Education Youth and Culture to teach Mathematics, Integrated Science and Information Communication Technology. He worked at the Glendevon Primary and Junior High School located in Montego Bay, up until his resignation in May 2012, to pursue entertainment.

== Music career ==
=== 2005–2010: Early career in Europe and name change ===
In May 2005, Teacha Dee began his professional career by recording "Life Goes On" for The Mighty Powpow Productions, a major reggae production label based in Germany. This song was sung in the melody of The Beatles hit "[Ob La Di]" and was released in 2006 as part of a compilation project titled "First Sight Riddim". However, "life goes on" was not published under the pseudonym "Teacha Dee" but as his given name, "Damian Warren".

In late 2006, Warren recorded a song titled "Them A Play" which was released on a riddim compilation called Gloria Riddim, produced by Dasvibes also based in Germany. This single was the first song to be officially released under the name "Teacha Dee".

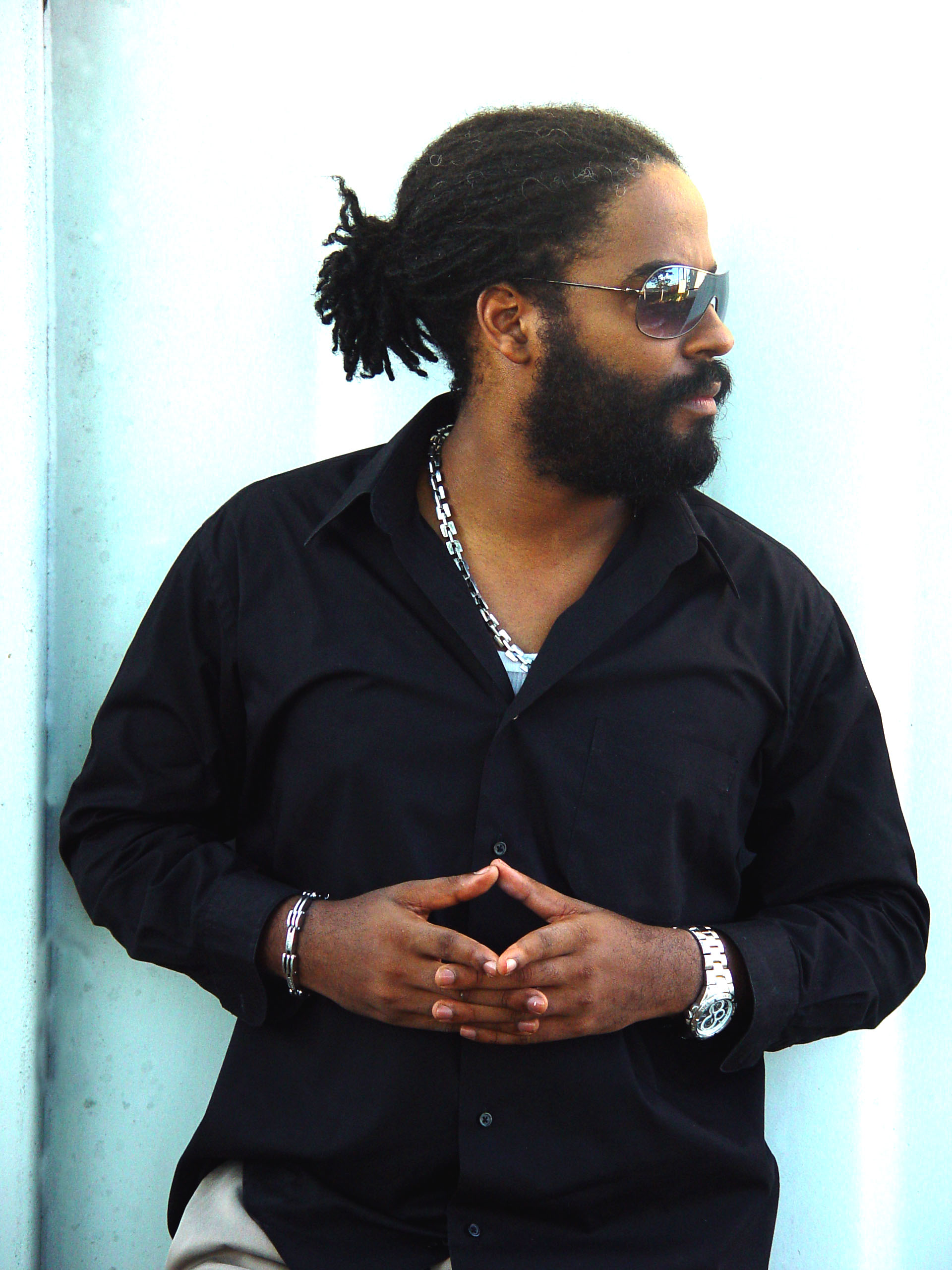
Teacha Dee Ras Tafarian Picture

In 2007, he recorded "Smuggling Weed" for Powpow Movements which became his first popular song within the European scene. However, his most successful song at that time was "Smoke and Fly". This was recorded as a sound system dub on the "Kingston Town" instrumental made popular by an Italian reggae superstar Alberto Dascola aka Alborosie. This song" quickly became a sound system's favorite and a huge hit within the reggae clubs.

Early 2008, Teacha Dee recorded "Blaming Game" for Master J Productions, a record label based in Montego Bay, Jamaica. "Blaming Game" was the first single that was in circulation on the radio stations in Jamaica. Prior to this, his music was gaining a lot of attention outside of Jamaica without the knowledge of many Jamaicans and the Ministry of Education. Teacha Dee recorded "Reggae Souljahs" for Rootdown Records later that same year. This song was released on a various artiste compilation called "Ilove Riddim" and it quickly became one of his popular reggae anthems in Germany. In August 2008, Teacha Dee started his own label called "Tenfloor Records" based in Montego Bay, Jamaica.

=== 2010–2014: Becoming Rasta and touring Europe ===
After some years of study, Teacha Dee accepted the Ras Tafari way of life in June 2010. This brought about a remarkable change in the messages in his music as well as his overall image. In August 2010, he began to focus on his own production company and produced his first collaboration titled "what i pray". This song features 'Determine', an artiste famous for a massive hit with Beenie Man. Teacha Dee released two various artiste compilations quickly after on his label. These were "Hot Box Riddim" and "Thirteen Riddim" both released in late 2010 and early 2011 respectively.

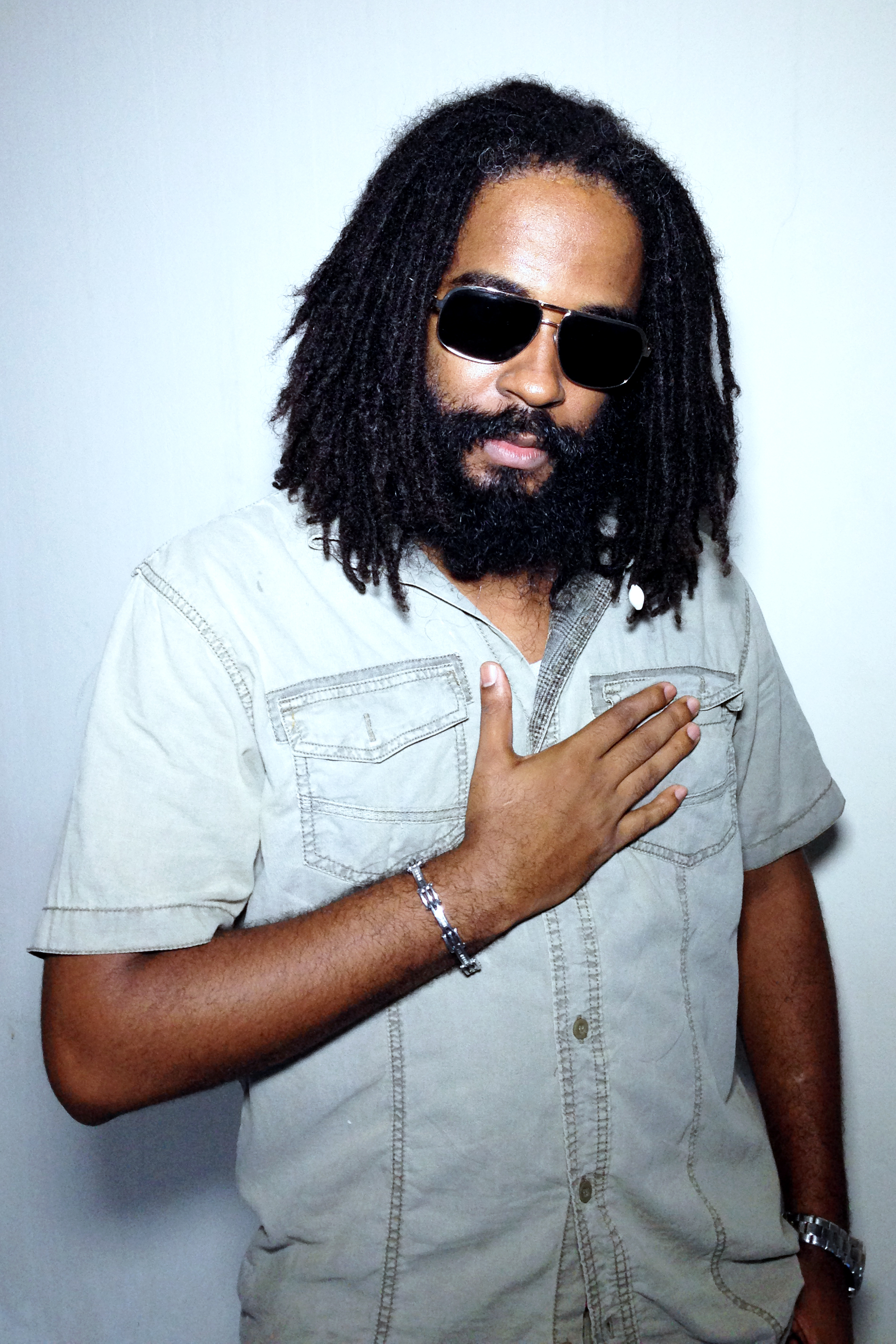
Teacha Dee Rastafarian Picture as of April 2013

In the summer of 2011, Teacha Dee embarked on his first European tour during his vacation leave from teaching. This tour gave a strong boost to his career on the international scene. The people who loved his songs, could now put a face to his music. His first tour included appearances at Yaam and Insel Clubs in Berlin, Faust in Hannover, Magnapop in Krefeld, Petit Prince and Lüxor in Köln, Rude 7 in Mannheim, Kulturfabrik in Hildeshiem, Wagen Bau in Hamburg and U-club in Wupertal. The highlight of his tour was his performance at the prestigious Reggaejam Festival in Bersenbrück, Germany.

During this trip Teacha Dee recorded for several producers. "Symbiz Productions" based in Germany, "Catchy Grezzly" based in Italy and "Soul Force Music" also based in Germany. In October 2011 immediately after his first tour, Teacha Dee released his debut album entitled "Reggae Souljahs: Beating Babylon With Music". This album was released on his own independent record label.

In April 2012, Teacha Dee returned to Europe for a mini tour. On this trip, he performed in Cantu Italy, Bern Switzerland and Oldenburg Germany. He also did repeated performances in Osnabruck and Mannheim. It was during this time he recorded a collaboration with Skarra Mucci entitled "Summer Time" for "Weedy G SoundForce" a Swiss-based label. This was how his affiliation with Weedy G Soundforce for whom he recorded many singles began. In May 2012, Teacha Dee recorded "Sound System" for Reggaeville/Oneness Productions both based in Germany. He also worked with producers such as "Catchy Greezly" based in Italy, Jugglers Music and Deebuzz Music both based in Germany. A total of 12 singles were released that same year for various producers including his own record label.

In August 2013, Teacha Dee and Utan Green collaborated on a single entitled "Reggae Show" on the " Reggae Jam Riddim" which was released at the 19th staging of the Reggae Jam festival held in Bersenbruck, Germany. Teacha Dee was a headliner for this festival.

=== 2014–2017: German reggae charts and sophomore album ===
On 4 July 2014, "Party Day" recorded for Germany-based upcoming producers "Dancehallrulerz" made it to the number one spot on the official German reggae charts. This chart presented by Jugglerz radio and Riddim Magazine, was the official Reggae chart of Germany. "Party Day" held the number one spot on two separate occasions. It went down the charts for a short time before returning to number one spot a few days later. These charts numbered 30/2014 and 33/2014 were posted on 26 August and 22 September respectively.

In July 2015, Teacha Dee released his first artiste mix-tape titled "Rasta Ting". It consisted of 26 tracks which were released within the European market and was presented by Europe's female sound sensation, Big Mama Sound. In that same month at the 21st staging of the Reggae Jam Festival in Bersenbruck, Teacha Dee's performance was reviewed as "one of the most riveting" by irieites.de. Their list of highlights also included David Rodigan, Anthony B, Alpheus, Ken Boothe, Winston Francis and Bitty McLean.

In 2016, Teacha Dee released a total of ten singles. The most successful of these were; "Jah Jah is calling" on the Pac Man Riddim, "Concrete Grave" on the After Berlin Wall Riddim and "Rastafari Way" on the Horn of Africa Riddim. Teacha Dee's major hit of 2016 was "Rastafari Way" which spent 14 days on Beatport's top 100 reggae/dub chart peaking at 44. Another solid performer was "Concrete Grave" which was selected in the top 100 reggae hits of 2016 by Zonareggae.ro based in Romania.

=== 2017–present: Latin American tour and movie placement deal ===
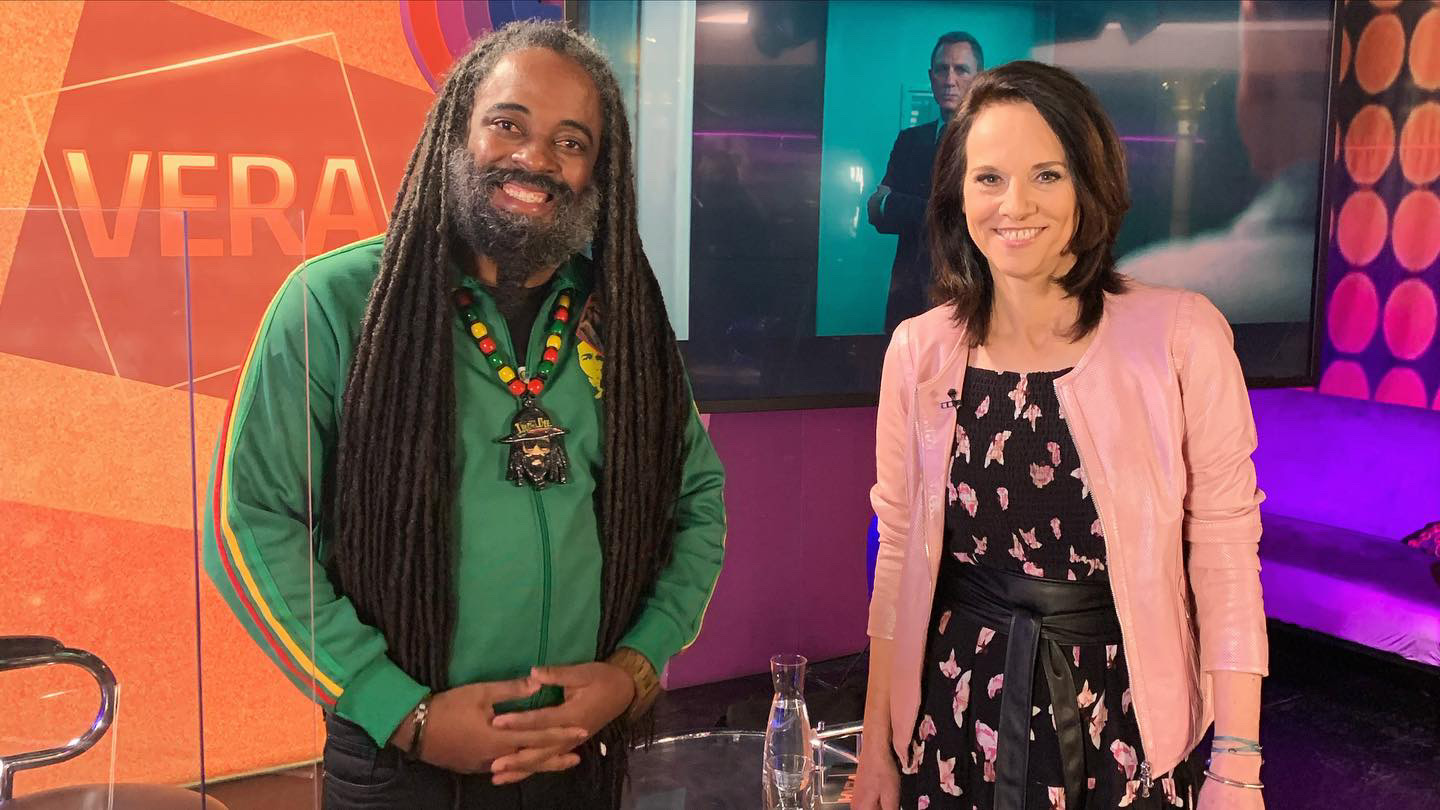
Teacha Dee on set with Vera Russwurm. Vienna, Austria

In July 2017 Reggaeville identified Teacha Dee's performance on Reggaejam as a highlight of the event. Shortly after, he went to Denmark as a headliner and closing act for the Aarhus Reggae Festival held at Voxhall, Aarhus. In July 2018, Teacha Dee was a headliner at the LB27 Reggae Camp Festival held in Cegléd, Hungary.

In May 2019 Teacha Dee went on his first Latin American tour, and was one of the headliners on the International Reggae Festival held in Riviera Nayarit, Mexico. This was his closing performance of the Red Jacket Tour, which also had appearances in Spain, Germany, France and Switzerland.

In February 2021, it was announced that the title track from Teacha Dee's sophomore album Rastafari Way was selected to be featured in No Time to Die. This is the 25th film in the James Bond series produced by Eon Productions. In March 2021 Teacha Dee appeared on VERA, a prestigious talk show hosted by award winning Television Presenter and Actress,Vera Russwurm. This programme was aired on one of the four main Austrian public television channels, ORF 2. There he spoke about Jamaica's long relationship with James Bond and the story behind the song, Rastafari Way.

== Discography ==
=== Albums ===
Studio Albums
Title	Release date	Label	Format
Reggae Souljahs: Beating Babylon With Music	31 October 2011	TenFloor Records	Digital Distribution
Rastafari Way	17 March 2017	TenFloor Records	Digital Distribution
Time Machine	21 December 2021	TenFloor Records	Digital Distribution

=== Singles ===
Singles
Title	Label	Release year	Format
”Smoke and Fly"	Fast Forward	2007	7-inch Vinyl
”Revolution"	La Familia Wes	2007	7-Inch Vinyl
”If You Have it Hard"	Master J Productions	2007	7-Inch Vinyl
”Reggae Soljah"	Rootdown Music	2008	7-Inch Vinyl
”All Him Soldiers"	Jah Beat	2008	7-Inch Vinyl
”The System"	DasVibes Productions	2009	Digital Distribution
”What I Pray"	Tenfloor Records	2010	Digital Distribution
”Crazy Vibes"	Jamaican Connexion	2010	Digital Distribution
”Smoke and Fly"- (Remake)	Tenfloor Records	2010	Digital Distribution
”Ganja We Love"	Lieders of the New School	2011	Digital Distribution
”Exclusive Song"	Tenfloor Records	2012	Digital Distribution
”Gal Segment"	Tenfloor Records	2012	Digital Distribution
”Long Day"	Tenfloor Records/Weedy G SoundForce	2013	Digital Distribution
”Rastafari Rise"	House of Riddim	2014	Digital Distribution
”Iron A Wail"	Irie Ites Music	2014	7-Inch Vinyl
”Meck It Rock"	La Familia Wes	2015	Digital Distribution
”Rebels Coming"	Jamrockvybz Records/VPAL Music	2017	Digital Distribution
”Forward Black Man"	Giddimani Records	2017	Digital Distribution
”Pushing You"	House Of Riddim	2018	Digital Distribution
”Spiritual Ride"	House Of Riddim	2018	Digital Distribution
”My Vibes"	Ragatac	2018	Digital Distribution
”Jah Say"	Evidence Music	2019	Digital Distribution

=== Various artists compilations ===
Various Artists Compilations
Artist	Title	Song/s	Release date	Label
Various Artists	Gloria Riddim	”Them a Play"	2006	Dasvibes
Various Artists	First Sight Riddim	"Life Goes On"	2006	Pow Pow Productions
Various Artists	Wes Roc Riddim	”Revolution"	2007	La Familia Wes
Various Artists	Wild West Riddim	”If yuh have it hard"	2007	Master J. Productions
Various Artists	Ovastand Riddim	”Smuggling Weed"	2007	Pow Pow Productions
Various Artists	Ice Ice Riddim vol. II	”Leading Cause of Death"	2007	Reggae Town Records
Various Artists	True Life Riddim	”Blaming Game"	2008	Master J Productions
Various Artists	ilove Riddin Pt.2	”Reggae Soljahs"	2008	Rootdown Records
Various Artists	TNT Riddim	”The System"	2009	Dasvibes
Various Artists	Hotbox Riddim	”Within My Soul"	2010	Tenfloor Records
Various Artists	Thirteen Riddim	”Everywhere", ”Mr. Thirteen"	2010	Tenfloor Records
Various Artists	Napoli Riddim	”Jah Guide and Keep You"	2012	Vaporetto Sound
Various Artists	Dark Fader Riddim (German Edition)	”Rasta Ting"	2012	Boomrush Productions
Various Artists	Dark Fader (Acoustic Edition)	”Rasta Ting (Acoustic)”	2012	Boomrush Productions
Various Artists	Reggaeville Riddim	”Sound System"	2012	Oneness Records
Various Artists	Sweet Sour Riddim	”I Will Try Again"	2012	Greezzly Productions
Various Artists	Roadster Riddim	”Welcome to the Summer"(with Skarra Mucci)	2012	Weedy G Soundforce
Various Artists	Zero Degreez Riddim	”Gal Dem Wha We"	2012	Tenfloor Records
Various Artists	Naughty Wifey Riddim	”Freedom"	2012	Dee Buzz Sound
Various Artists	Kickdown Riddim	”Spliff and Beer"	2012	Jugglerz Records
Various Artists	Jump Up Riddim	”Just Weed"	2012	Weedy G Soundforce
Various Artists	Event Riddim	”So Me Like It"	2013	Weedy g Soundforce
Various Artists	Love Is Universal Riddim	”High Hopes"	2013	Soulove Records
Various Artists	Come Down Again Riddim	”Can’t Kill Easy"	2013	Weedy G Soundforce
Various Artists	OneFourFive	”All Alone"(with Symbiz)	2013	Rootdown Records
Various Artists	Arise and Shine Riddim	”Lady in Black"	2013	Weedy G Soundforce
Various Artists	The War Riddim EP	”The Blessings"	2013	Weedy G Soundforce
Various Artists	Blazing Faya Riddim	”Change Within"	2013	GMC Music Productions
Various Artists	OneFourFive	”All Alone"-(Feat. Symbiz)	2013	Rootdown Records
Various Artists	The Nairobi Riddim	”War Big Business"	2013	MKZWO-RECORDS
Various Artists	Big Vibez Riddim	”Blaze A Fire"	2013	Weedy G Soundforce/VPAL Music
Various Artists	Reggae Jam Riddim	”Reggae Show"-(feat. Utan Green)	2013	House of Riddim Productions
Various Artists	Casiotone Riddim	”One Champion"	2013	Weedy G Soundforce
Various Artists	Sleng Teng 2014	”Mash Up The Club"	2014	Weedy G Soundforce
Various Artists	New Boxing Riddim	”Help"	2014	Soulove Records
Various Artists	Swing Heavy Riddim	”Forward Inna Di Dance"-(Feat. Skarra Mucci)	2014	Itation Records/Bizzarri Records
Various Artists	Rise	”We Nuh Fraid"-(Feat. Perfect Giddimani)	2014	Weedy G Soundfore/VPAL Music
Various Artists	Boat Riddim	”Haters Gwey"	2014	Francesco Salteri (Greezzly Productions)
Various Artists	Sunscreen Riddim Selection	”Party Day"	2014	DancehallRulerz
Various Artists	Onion Jerk Riddim	”Shell it down"	2014	Bikini Ape
Various Artists	Squeeze Riddim	”Evil Ones"	2015	Weedy G Soundforce/VPAL Music
Various Artists	Joyful Soul Riddim	”Dwello"	2015	Francesco Salteri (Greezzly Productions)
Various Artists	Better Run Riddim	”Medication"-(Feat. Skarra Mucci, Don Tippa)	2015	Dub Inc
Various Artists	Believe Riddim – EP	”See Saw"	2015	Sazzah Studio Records
Various Artists	Aquarious Riddim	”Easy To Love"	2015	Francesco Salteri (Greezzly Productions)
Various Artists	Surfer’s Big Wave Motivation Soundtrack	”See Saw"	2016	Peace Tunes
Various Artists	Pac Man Riddim	”Jah Jah Is Calling"	2016	Kathmandu Productions/House of Riddim
Various Artists	Bay Area Riddim	”Traffic Light Dread"	2016	Giddimani Records
Various Artists	Colorful Side Riddim	”Power Hungry"	2016	Tidouz Productions
Various Artists	Roots & Kulcha Riddim	”Suppen Nuh Right"	2016	Francesco Salteri (Greezzly Productions)
Various Artists	After Berlin Wall Riddim	”Concrete Grave"	2016	Martin Kugler (Papa Noah Productions)
Various Artists	Reelz	”Get So High"-(With Perfect Giddimani, Don Tippa, Skarra Mucci)	2016	Weedy G Soundforce/VPAL Music
Various Artists	Sicknature Riddim Selection	”Stones and Gems"	2016	Boomrush Productions
Various Artists	Horn of Africa Riddim	”Rastafari Way"	2016	Giddimani Records
Various Artists	Lionrock Riddim	”Show Respect"	2016	Liontown Records
Various Artists	Zion Bound Riddim	”Lightning Earthquake and Thunder"	2016	Francesco Salteri (Greezzly Productions)
Various Artists	Danger Zone Riddim	”Do Today"	2016	House of Riddim
Various Artists	Burnhard Spliffington Riddim	”Emperor Selassie"	2017	Giddimani Records
Various Artists	Nike Ear Riddim	”Home Owner"	2017	Giddimani Records
Various Artists	Kenyakibera Riddim	”Walk Away"	2017	Giddimani Records
Various Artists	Agogo Riddim	”Poor People" (Don Tippa)	2017	Roots Rebel Sound
Various Artists	Nugs & Kisses Riddim	”Calm Down"	2017	Giddimani Records
Various Artists	Like The Wind Riddim	”Mankind"	2017	Catchy Record
Various Artists	Hot Fire Riddim	”One Big Stone"	2017	Evidence Music
Various Artists	Jah Sazzah Presents Get Up Riddim	”Fed Up"	2017	Sazzah Studio Records
Various Artists	Digital Alliance, Vol. 1	”Help Everyone"	2018	Napem Records
Various Artists	Time and Tide Riddim	”What a Feeling"	2018	Greezzly
Various Artists	Old Jack Plug Riddim	”Mental Problem"	2018	Giddimani Records
Various Artists	Chalice Geezas Riddim - EP	”Keep Me Away"	2018	Giddimani Records
Various Artists	Mighty Roots Riddim - EP	”Ego"	2018	Ambassador Musik Production
Various Artists	Civil Rights Riddim	”Forward Black Man"	2018	Giddimani Records
Various Artists	Anti-Racism Riddim	”Rastafari Warning"	2018	Giddimani Records
Various Artists	My Favorite DJ Riddim	”Rescue"	2019	Giddimani Records
Various Artists	Carry Beyond Riddim - EP	”Too Late"	2019	Sazzah Studio Records
Various Artists	Inna We Heart Riddim' - EP	”First Man"	2019	Ragatac Music
Various Artists	Vinyllionaires Club Riddim	”Attitude of Gratitude"	2019	Giddimani Records
Various Artists	Windrush Generation Riddim	”Rat Trap"	2019	Giddimani Records
Various Artists	Abaddown	”Jah Say"	2019	Evidence Music
Various Artists	Angry Beast Riddim	”Inspired"	2020	Giddimani Records
Various Artists	Dub Club Riddim	”World Crisis"	2020	Giddimani Records
Various Artists	Mama Afrika Riddim	”Train Delay"	2020	Nyah Bless Music
Various Artists	Catch Me Riddim	”Burn Some Marijuana"	2020	Kathmandu Productions.
Various Artists	Rate Who Rate You Riddim	”Band Mind"	2020	Wilmac Records
Various Artists	Magnifico Riddim	”Lyrical Don Dada"	2021	Greezzly
Various Artists	Serious Time Riddim	”The Golden Rule"	2021	Kathmandu Productions

=== Appearances ===
Appearances
Artist	Title	Song/s	Release date	Label
Symbiz	Thursday Sessions	”Beat Babylon", "Ev'rywhere"	2011	Rootdown Records
Lady N	N'Cognito	”Only You"	2012	Boomrush Productions
Symbiz	OneFourFive	”All Alone"	2013	Rootdown Records
Skarra Mucci	Greater Than Great	”Forward Inna Di Dance", "Red"	2014	Undisputed Records/Rawkaz Clan
Chucky Fully Loaded	ChuckyFullyLoaded & Prince Su	”Jah Jah We Pray", "Good Day"	2014	Fully Loaded Inc
Meli One	Through My Beats (Deluxe Edition)’’	”The Street Is on Fire", "Got It (Remix)"	2014	New Generation Music Group
King Ital Rebel	Good Vybz	”Rebels Coming"	2017	Jamrockvybz Records/VPAL Music
Perfect Giddimani	Live My Life Again	”Positive Energy"	2017	Giddimani Records/House of Riddim
King Ital Rebel	OG Summer	”No Guns"	2017	Jamrockvybz Records/VPAL Music
Perfect Giddimani	Dub & Happiness EP	”Dub & Happiness"	2018	Giddimani Records/House of Riddim
Blend Mishkin	Stop Run Maths (Single)	”Stop Run Maths"	2019	Undisputed Records
Rad Dixon	Tasjay Productions presents: Change EP	”Keep the Children Safe"	2020	Tasjay Productions
Radikal Vibration	Jah Say - Single	”Jah Say"	2020	Evidence Music
SINKS	Terror Australis	”They Know", " They Know (Phil Gektor Remix)	2020	SINKS

=== Official mixtapes ===
- 2015: Rasta Ting – present by Big Mama Sound

=== Mixtapes appearances ===
- 2005: Young and Sexy Vol 9 – DJ L and DJ Suss one
- 2006: Young and Sexy Vol 10 – DJ L and DJ Suss One
- 2008: Bad Boys, We Run This – Urban World Wireless and Bad Boy Records
- 2009: Rise to the top – DJ Mess and Ghetto Youth Sounds
- 2009: Austriamaica Vol 1 – by Chiquitaman and San Clemente
