= Sam Sharpe Teachers College =

Sam Sharpe Teachers College, Jamaica
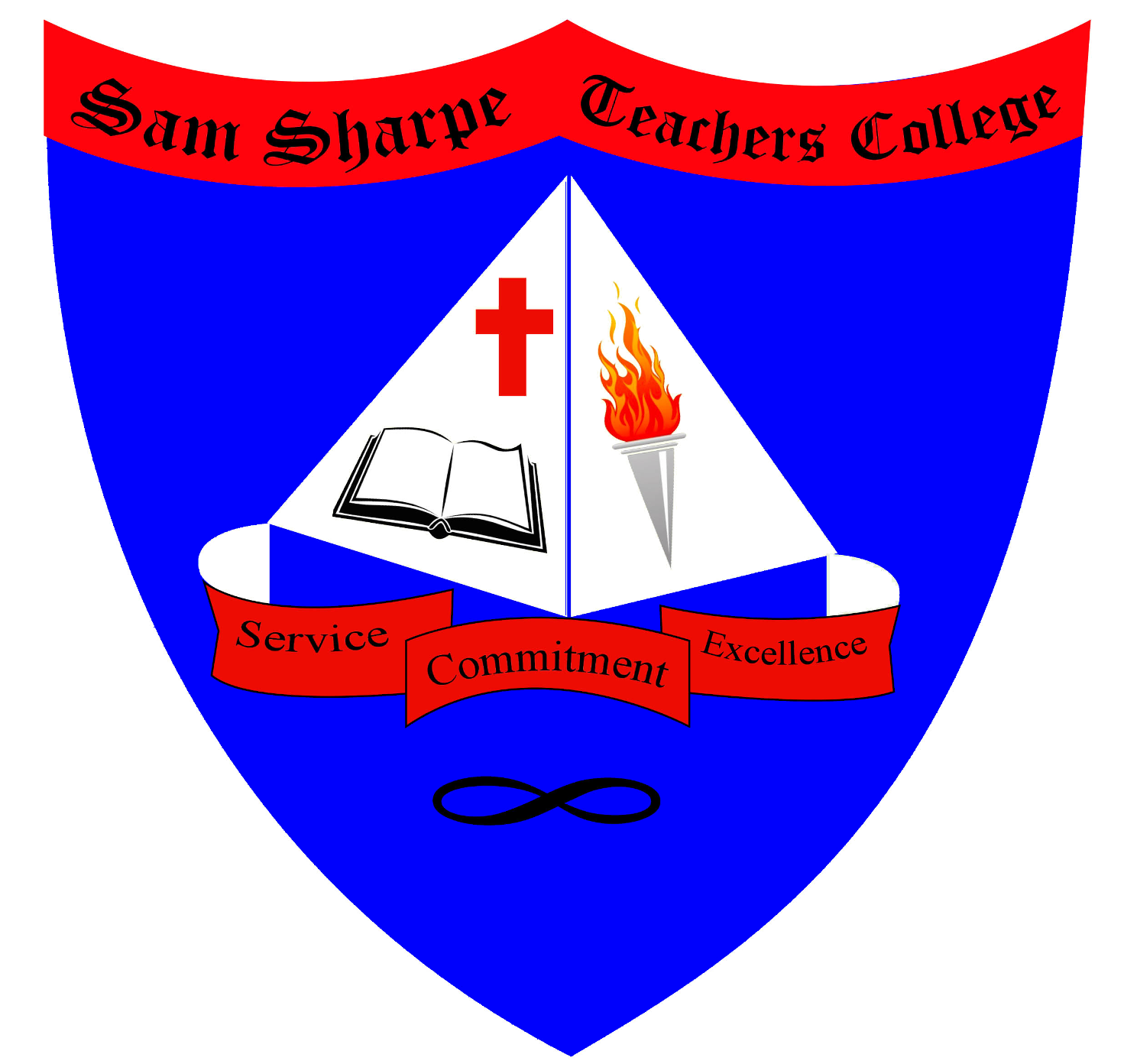
- Motto: Service, Commitment, Excellence
- Type: Public Government-Owned
- Established: 1975; 51 years ago
- Principal: Ricardo Bennett PhD
- Location: Montego Bay, Jamaica; 18°26′57″N 77°53′50″W
- Campus: 13 acres; Urban
- Website: www.sstc.edu.jm

Sam Sharpe Teachers’ College (formerly Granville Teachers’ College) is a college located in Montego Bay, Saint James, Jamaica.

The college was established in September 1975 from funding received from the World Bank and the Government of Jamaica. Initially, this institution was called Granville Teachers’ College, a named derived from its proximity to the Granville community in Saint James. Sam Sharpe Teachers College also provided programmes outside of the teacher training curriculum to the constituents of neighbouring communities.

In October 1975 the college was renamed Sam Sharpe Teachers’ College in honour of National Hero Samuel Sharpe.

The college offers Bachelor of Education (B. Ed.) Programmes in the following majors and minors:

1) School Counselling

2) Spanish (Major) French (Minor)

3) English Language & Literature (Double Major)

4) English Language (Major) Spanish (Minor)

5) Mathematics (Double Major)

6) Biology (Major) Mathematics (Minor)

7) Biology (Double Major)

8) Special Education

9) Early Childhood Education

10) Music Education (Double Major)

11) Primary Education (Language Arts & Social Studies and Mathematics & Science)

12) Business Studies

The college also offers an Associate of Arts (AA) Degree in Music in collaboration with the Edna Manley College of the Visual and Performing Arts: School of Music with majors in:

1) Music Education

2) Music Performance

== Notable alumni ==
- Damion Warren, known professionally as Teacha Dee, Jamaican International reggae singer, producer and educator
