= Manning's School =

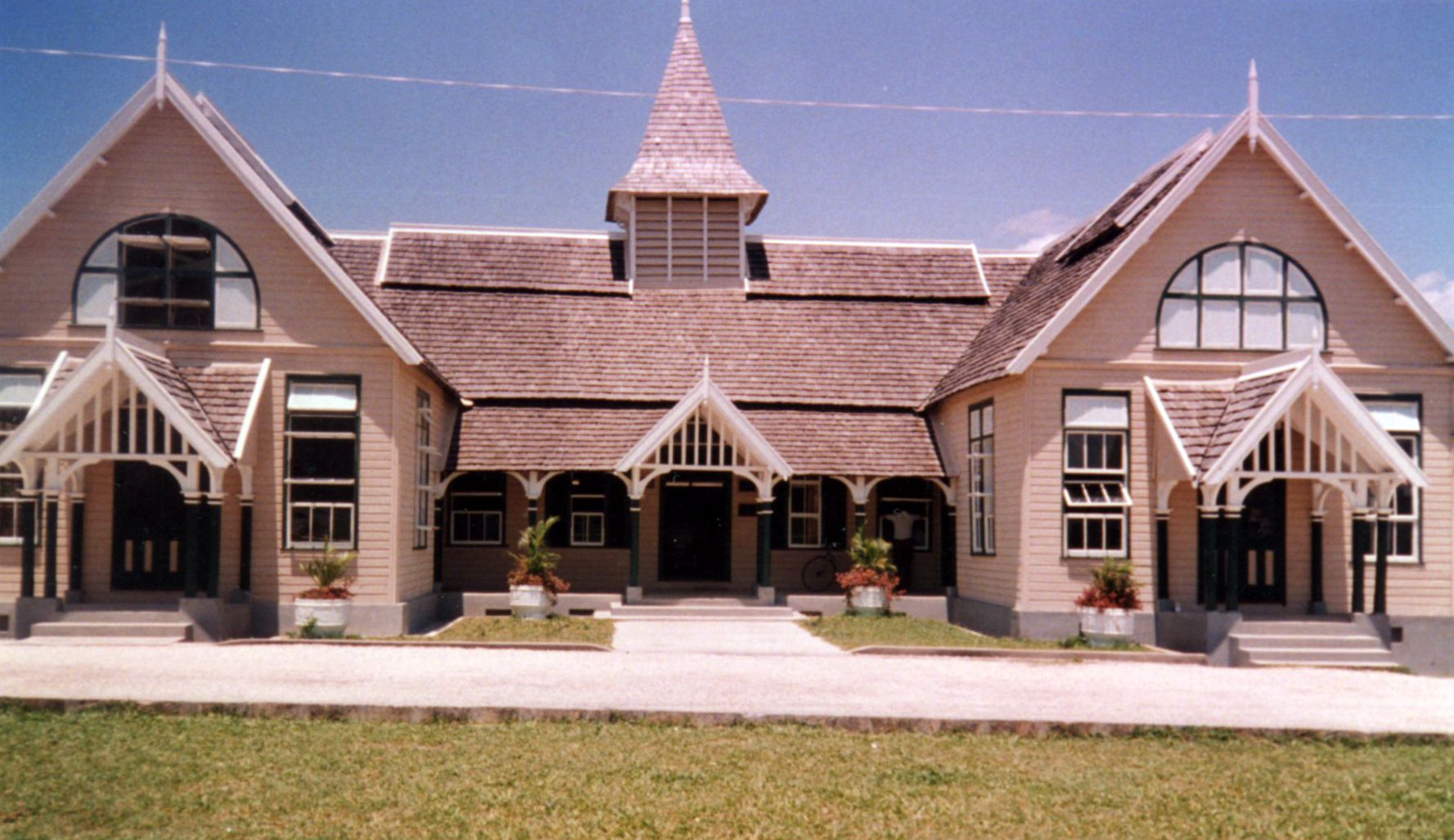
- Thomas Manning Building

Location
- Beckford St. Western region Savanna-la-Mar, Westmoreland; Jamaica; 18°13′36″N 78°07′58″W

Information
- Type: Public school (government funded)
- Motto: Vita sine litteris mors est (Life without learning is death)
- Religious affiliation: Anglican
- Established: 1738; 288 years ago
- Founder: Thomas Manning (bequest)
- School code: 10055
- Principal: Steve Gordon
- Years offered: 7–13
- Gender: Co-educational
- Age range: 10-19
- Enrolment: 1,686 (2018)
- Student to teacher ratio: 17:1
- Language: English
- Colours: Dark blue and light blue
- Song: Dear Mannings School [Played to the tune of "The Londonderry Air"].
- Sports: Track and field, Football, Volleyball, Badminton, Table Tennis, Swimming, Netball, Basketball, Chess
- Website: www.manningsschoolja.org

Manning's School in Savanna-la-Mar, Westmoreland, Jamaica, which started offering classes in 1738, is the oldest continuously operating high school in Jamaica.

There is often debate whether Manning's or Wolmer's Trust School for Boys, one of the Wolmer's Schools is the oldest in Jamaica or the oldest continuously operating high school in Jamaica. Thomas Manning (who bequeathed the land and initial funding for Manning's in 1710) did so before John Wolmer (whose will provided for the money to fund Wolmer's in 1729). Manning's continued without ceasing since its doors were first opened, whilst Wolmer's record provides that for two years (1755-1757) its doors were closed.

== History ==
The history of the Manning's School dates back to a quarter of a century before the actual establishment of the institution, when in 1710, Thomas Manning, a Westmoreland planter, bequeathed a gift of land for the setting up of a free school in the parish of Westmoreland. The school was established in 1738 when the Jamaica Assembly passed an Act (11 Geo. II c. 9), after which the Free School was formally set up.

In the 18th century, these schools originated from their benefactors’ concerns for the education of the country's poor, usually the children of poor whites, as there was no system in place for the education of the children of slaves.

As the years progressed, the 20th Century led to the reorganization of the institution into a modern high school.

== Academics ==
School Profile
Year	Enrollment	Student-Teacher Ratio
2018	1,686	17:1
2017	1,754	20:1
2016	1,717	20:1
2015	1,729	19:1
2014	1,743	19:1
2013	1,765	19:1
2012	1,754	19:1

== Historic buildings ==
The oldest existing part of the school which was built in the early 20th Century is known as the Thomas Manning Building, named in honour of the school's founder. It is the most outstanding building on the entire school property and is currently used as a library and classrooms. The building, an example of Georgian architecture, was declared a National Heritage site by the Jamaica National Heritage Trust in 1999.

== Notable alumni ==
- Allison Beckford, Jamaican sprinter.
- Anna-Sharé Blake, known professionally as Sevana, Jamaican singer.
- Victor Brooks, Jamaican Olympic long jumper.
- Hon. Samuel Bulgin, QC, JP, Attorney General of the Cayman Islands
- Hon. Roger Clarke, former Agriculture Minister of Jamaica.
- Vonette Dixon, Jamaican Olympic hurdler.
- Dahlia Duhaney, Jamaican Olympic sprinter.
- Haughton Forrest, Australian artist.
- Craig Foster, Jamaican international footballer
- Duwayne Kerr, an international footballer who plays as a goalkeeper for Jamaica.
- Hon. Marlene Malahoo Forte, QC, Attorney-General of Jamaica
- Stephenie Ann McPherson, Jamaican Olympic sprinter
- Hazel Monteith, former Senator, consumer-rights advocate, and radio personality
- Stephanie Saulter, Jamaican scientist and science fiction author.
- Storm Saulter filmmaker and photographer. He wrote and directed the 2010 film Better Mus' Come and directed the 2018 film Sprinter. In 2020, Sprinter was released on Netflix.
- Trecia-Kaye Smith, Jamaican Olympic triple jumper.
- Kaliese Spencer, Jamaican Olympic hurdler.
- Damion Warren, known professionally as Teacha Dee, Jamaican reggae singer and educator
- Chester Watson, a former Jamaican cricketer. Watson played seven Tests for the West Indies in the late 1950s and early 1960s.
