= Jamaican Yorubas =

Ethnic groups in Jamaica of Yoruba origin

Languages
- English, Jamaican English, Jamaican Patois, Nago/Etu ritualized songs

Religion
- Traditional religion, Christianity

Related ethnic groups
- Yoruba people, Yoruba Americans, Brazilian Yorubas, Afro-Jamaicans

Jamaican Yorubas are descendants of 19th century indentured labourers from Benin republic and Nigeria. They identify themselves as the Nago people of Westmoreland, who also have links to the Etu people of Hanover. It's important to note that there was already Yorubas on the island of Jamaica through the transatlantic trade, before the arrival of indentured labourers from Africa that came in the 19th century between 1840s and 1860s after emancipation.

== Locale ==
Nago refers to southwestern subgroups of the Yoruba people from western Nigeria and eastern Benin astride borders. The groups known as Ifonyins, Aworis, Ohoris, and Ketus are collectively referred to as Nagos. It is believe Nago comes from the word anago from Fon-speaking people. Nago/Anago became a general synonymous designation term for Yorubas in Benin and their diasporans in countries like Brazil and Jamaica.

The Nago people of Jamaica named their settlement in Westmoreland “Abeokuta”, after their hometown in modern day Nigeria. This Jamaican location-name mirrors that of a town (today a city) in southern west Nigeria, whose name translates to ‘under the rock’—a nod to a prominent inselbergs in the area, especially Olumo Rock. Likewise, the Waterworks location in Westmoreland, Jamaica is marked by the presence of a large rock formation. According to Monica Schuler, the settlement of Abeokuta—named after its African counterpart—was established after 1841 by Yoruba individuals from Waterworks Pen and the neighboring Dean’s Valley estate, as well as from the Shrewsbury and Bluecastle estates. Westmoreland Abeokuta is said to be also called "Bekuta" for short by the local people of the area.

The related Etu people can be found in the Jamaican parish of Hanover, namely: Pell River, Cauldwell, Dean's Town, Kendal, Francis Town, Spragg Hill, Grange and Kingsvale. The origin of the name Etu is not completely understood by researchers, but it is believe to came from Yoruba Etutu, meaning "peace, atonement, shortened" of ceremonial performance. Through cultural similarities, they have been tied to the Nago.

Although they all refer to themselves as Nago, this label is more commonly linked to the community of Abeokuta in Westmoreland. In contrast, the Yoruba-descended communities located in Hanover are more frequently known as Ettu/Etu. The term Ettu/Etu also refers to the ceremonial performance held during commemorative events by these groups.

The early Yoruba arrivals in Jamaica before emancipation also gave names to locations like Naggo Head in St. Catherine parish and Naggo Town Westmoreland parish.

== Religion and culture ==
The Etu and the Nago live just like other Jamaicans, but they have special food ceremonies for a number of events such as traditional weddings, funerals 30-40 days after a death, and dreams. The purpose of these food ceremonies - full of drumming, song, and dance - is said to be to seek guidance from their ancestors.

The song and dance of the Nago and Etu have made a notable contribution Jamaican music.

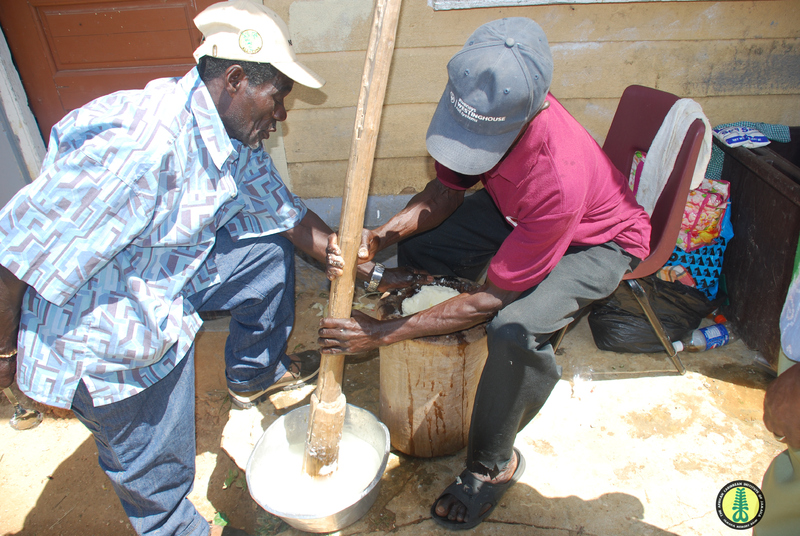
Etu men making fufu in Grange, Hanover

== See also ==
- Jamaicans of African ancestry
- Yoruba people
