= Hazel Monteith =

Jamaican senator, radio personality and social worker

- Born: Hazel Conupe Williams; 19 June 1917; Savanna-la-Mar, Westmoreland Parish, in the British crown colony of Jamaica
- Died: 22 May 2012 (aged 94); Kingston, Jamaica
- Education: Manning's School (Diploma) University of the West Indies (BSW)
- Occupation: Social worker
- Spouse: Emmanuel Jocelyn Monteith
- Children: 2

Hazel Conupe Monteith, O.D., J.P. (née Williams; 19 June 1917 – 22 May 2012) was an Afro-Jamaican consumer rights advocate, radio personality and social worker. Graduating from the first course in social work offered by the University of the West Indies, Monteith worked for twelve years as a traveling field agent coordinating social welfare projects for the Jamaica Federation of Women.

In 1972, she became a regional officer at the Council of Voluntary Social Services and was tasked with creating the Citizen's Advice Bureau. Through innovative programs, she developed training and advice centers and radio broadcasts to help citizens with a wide variety of issues, from how to register vital records, to employment training, to where to obtain assistance for household goods. She was honored as an officer in the Order of Distinction in 1982 and subsequently appointed a Senator from 1986 to 1989.

== Early life ==
Hazel Conupe Williams was born on 19 June 1917 in Savanna-la-Mar in the Westmoreland Parish, of the British crown colony of Jamaica to Blanche Maud Evangeline (née Tomlinson) and Nathaniel F. Williams. She graduated from the Manning's School and as a student was a member of the Girl Guides. The organization fostered her interest in community service and social work. In 1942, she married Emmanuel Jocelyn Monteith a Clerk of the Courts in Santa Cruz, St Elizabeth, They subsequently moved to Kingston, and had two children: Horace and Delaine.

== Career ==
After raising her children, in 1960, Monteith was hired as the field coordinator and traveling organizer for the Jamaica Federation of Women (JFW). The JFW was a conservative women's organization which coordinated social welfare projects throughout the country, teaching life and leadership skills to other women. As field coordinator, Monteith travelled to parish towns and rural districts to assist the rural and urban poor with programs like nutrition and adequate schooling. She enrolled in the first social work program offered by the University of the West Indies and graduated in 1963. Continuing her own education, in 1965, she travelled to New York City; Washington, D. C.; Ridgetown; and Toronto, Canada observing various programs on community planning and development.

After twelve years, Monteith resigned from the JFW in 1972 and began working as a regional officer at the Council of Voluntary Social Services. In her new position, she developed programs to implement registration for births, deaths, marriages, and social services. Simultaneously, in 1973, she became the first executive director of The Citizen's Advice Bureau, an NGO, which gave assistance, counseling, and free legal advice to the public.

Topics covered a broad range of subjects, from land titles to probate issues, and she was broadcast daily on Radio Jamaica Rediffusion (RJR) on "Jamaica Today". Particularly, the Citizen's Advice Bureau targeted the needs of citizens in distress, such as the unemployed and those facing economic hardship, providing free consultation in a variety of subjects or referrals to government agencies.

Monteith began writing a regular column for the Sunday Gleaner and was asked by RJR write for their broadcast program Grapevine. Its success, led the program director of RJR, Winston Ridgard, to create the program Hotline for the Citizen's Advice Bureau to air three times a week.

From 1975, the program aired island-wide, offering help to people looking for work, needing clothing or household items, or other types of social assistance. In 1981, she founded the Citizens Advice Bureau's Basic School, to provide basic job training skills for workers. Focusing on home economics and child care, students at the school were taught what they should expect as an employee and what employers would expect of them.

In 1982, Monteith was honored as an officer in the Order of Distinction for her service to the improvement of the nation in social services. Her radio program was widely popular and earned an award from The Gleaner in 1984.

In 1986, Monteith was appointed as an Independent Senator in the Jamaican Parliament replacing Barbara Blake-Hanna, who had resigned. She served until 1989 and though she stepped down from active participation in the legislature, Monteith continued to serve as a justice of the peace.

In 1990, she founded the Hazel Monteith Skills Training Centre to extend the work for women that the Citizens Advice Bureau had performed for many years. The new facility provided certificates to students who had completed childcare and domestic science courses and they expanded their classes to include lessons on cooking, dressmaking, hygiene, and telephone ethics. Within two years, the Centre had developed an internship program, where the students completed three weeks of on-the-job training as part of the coursework.

Monteith retired on 30 May 1997 and with her retirement, the RJR radio show was cancelled, though the Citizen's Advice Bureau entered negotiations with the radio station to allow it to continue.

== Death and legacy ==
Monteith died on 22 May 2012 in Kingston and was buried after a service at the East Queen Street Baptist Church on 14 June. She is remembered for her dedication to the welfare of women and the underprivileged to Jamaica and the innovative programs that she implemented to provide job training and consumer assistance.

== Posthumous Legacy ==
October 27, 2025 marks 45 years since the Citizens Advise Bureau Basic School has been in operation. It continues to push forward its mandate to shape young minds for a better tomorrow. The Hazel Monteith Skills Training Centre now operates in partnership with the Heart Trust NTA, certifying countless Jamaicans in varying skills.
