= Chalice (reggae band) =

Jamaican reggae band

- Origin: Gibraltar Hill, St. Mary, Jamaica
- Genres: Reggae
- Years active: 1980–present
- Members: Wayne Armond; Winston "Alla" Lloyd; Keith "Papa Keith" Francis; Dean Stephens; Wayne "C-Sharp" Clarke; Andrew "Preggs" Thompson; Jerome Tulloch
- Past members: Trevor "Oswald" Roper; Michael Wallace; Patrick Anderson; Phanso Wilson; Robbie Peart; Steve Golding; Demar Gayle; Desi Jones

Chalice is a Jamaican reggae band formed in 1980 in Gibraltar Hill, St. Mary. Chalice is probably best known for their performances at the Reggae Sunsplash music festival.

== Biography ==
The band was formed in 1980, taking its name from a smoking pipe By 1981 they were a local success and in 1982 their debut album, Blasted, spawned two hit singles in Jamaica. "I Still Love You" stayed at number one for seven weeks, and "Good To Be There" broke the Top 10 the following year.

Their second album, Standard Procedure, was also popular with the singles "I'm Trying" and "Cant Dub". For three years Chalice toured Europe, but they never became as popular in there as in their homeland. A third album, Stand Up was released and scored another hit in Jamaica with the single, "Dangerous Disturbances". When problems put an end to their period in Europe, they turned their attention to the United States and Mexico, and released their album, Crossfire. In Jamaica the song "Revival Time" was a number one hit, but in the United States the song was not as popular. In 1988 they returned to Africa and went back to the United States, where they released their album, Catch It.

From 1989 to 1990 Chalice toured Mexico, and in 1990 their sixth album, Si Mi Ya was released. In December 1990 they were invited to headline the first Mexico Sunsplash. In 1991 a major change took place in the band, when drummer Phanso Wilson and the late lead singer Trevor Roper migrated to the United States. Roper was replaced by Dean Stephens and Wilson by Wayne 'C Sharp' Clarke. Their seventh album, Tuff Enuff was released only in Austria. In 1996 they disbanded.

Original Keyboarder Michael Wallace was killed in 1999.

Chalice regrouped in 2006, ten years after their last performance at Reggae Sumfest. They returned to the stage in 2007 for the Symphony Under The Stars Concert in Jamaica. Since then, they have headlined events such as Air Jamaica Jazz & Blues Festival, Rebel Salute, Calabash Festival as well as events in Miami, Fl and The Cayman Islands among many other concerts. They returned in 2011 as the closing act for one of Jamaica's best known festivals – Reggae Sumfest.

Chalice released Let It Play (Tad's Records), in October 2010, Let It Play is the group's first studio album in over 10 years.

Original Lead singer and guitarist Trevor Roper died after battling cancer in Chicago in 2013. Founder Robbie Peart died on 4 August 2015, aged 61.

As of 2018, the band comprised original members Wayne Armond (vocals/guitar), Winston "Alla" Lloyd (keyboards), and Keith "Papa Keith" Francis (bass guitar), along with Dean Stephens (lead vocals), Wayne "C-Sharp" Clarke (drums), Andrew "Preggs" Thompson (electronic percussion), and Jerome Tulloch (keyboards), with drummer Desi Jones an occasional member.

== Band members ==
=== Present ===
- Dean Stephens (lead vocals)
- Wayne Armond (guitar, vocals)
- Donald Waugh (lead guitar)
- Ervin 'Alla' Lloyd (keyboards, vocals)
- Jerome Tulloch (keyboards)
- Wayne "C-Sharp" Clarke (drums)
- 'Papa' Keith Francis (bass)

=== Past members ===
- Trevor "Oswald" Roper (lead vocals)
- Michael Wallace (Keyboards)
- Patrick Anderson (drums)
- Phanso Wilson (drums)
- Robbie Peart (founder)
- Steve Golding (lead guitar)
- Demar Gayle (keyboards)
- Desi Jones (drums)

== Discography ==
=== Albums ===
- 1982: Blasted (Pipe Music)
- 1983: Standard Procedure (Pipe Music)
- 1984: Stan' Up (Pipe Music)
- 1984: Good To Be There (Ariola)
- 1985: Catch It (Fonarte Latino) & (Rohit)
- 1986: Crossfire (Techniques)
- 1990: Si Mi Ya (Peace Pipe Records)
- 1998: Tuff Enuff (Austria Release)
- 2010: Let It Play (Tad's Records) ***#10 New York Top 20 Reggae Albums

=== Singles ===
- 1984: "I'm Trying" (Ariola)
- 1984: "Funny Kinda Reggae" (Ariola)
- 1985: "Wicked Intention" (Pipe Music)
- 2008: "Good To Be There ft. Taurus Riley" (Cannon)
- 2011: "Walking To Somalia" (Chalice Records/Skinny Bwoy Jamaica)
- 2012: "Our Anniversary" (Chalice Records/Skinny Bwoy Jamaica)

=== Compilation appearances ===
- 1985: The Complete Reggae Music Album (Arcade)
- 1987: Romantic Nights – "I Never Knew Love" (CSA) Romantic Nights Roots Archives Listing.
- 1996: Fire on the Mountain: Reggae Celebrates The Grateful Dead – "Fire On The Mountain" Pow Wow
- 1997: Jamaica Ska – Kore – "Hit You Like A Bomb" (Dressed To Kill)
- 1997: The Best of the Vintage – The Original Singers – "Good To Be There" (Joe Gibbs) The Best Of the Vintage – The Original Singers Roots Archives Listing
- 1997: Reggae For Lovers – "I Never Knew Love" (Hallmark) Reggae For Lovers Roots Archives Listing
- 1998: The Complete UK Upsetter Singles Collection Vol 4 – "He Who Feels It – Prince Tallis & Chalice" (Trojan) The Complete UK Upsetter Singles Collection Vol 4 Roots Archive Listing
- 1999: Reggae – "Shine On" Radio Star Records
- 2002: Blowin' In The Wind: Reggae Tribute To Bob Dylan – "Lay Lady Lay" (Madacy Entertainment Group) Blowin' In The Wind Rhapsody Listing
- 2002: The Tide Is High: A Tribute To Rock N' Roll – "Master Blaster" (Madacy Entertainment Group) The Tide Is High Rhapsody Listing
- 2002: Here Comes The Sun: A Reggae Tribute To The Beatles – "Imagine" (Madacy Entertainment Group) Here Comes The Sun: A Reggae Tribute To The Beatles Amazon Listing
- 2002: Paint It Black: A Reggae Tribute... – "Paint it Black" (Madacy Entertainment Group)
- 2004: Trojan RAS Reggae Box Set – "Stand Up" (Trojan) Trojan RAS Reggae Box Set Roots Archives Listing
- 2004: 20 Best of Reggae – "Lay Lady Lay" (Madacy Entertainment Group) 20 Best of Reggae Rhapsody Listing
- 2005: Ultimate Reggae – "Lay Lady Lay" & "Master Blaster" (Madacy Entertainment Group) The Ultimate Reggae Rhapsody Listing
- 2006: The Stars of Reggae Sunsplash – "Ital Love – Live" (Charly Records) The Stars of Reggae Sunsplash Rhapsody Listing
- 2006: World Classics: Ital Love – "Revival Time Live" & "Ital Love Live" (Charly Records) World Classics: Ital Love Rhapsody Listing
- 2006: 15 Crucial Reggae Cuts – "Hit You Like A Bomb" & Stan Up" (Charly Records) 15 Crucial Reggae Cuts Rhapsody Listing
- 2008: Joe Gibbs Scorchers From The Mighty Two – "Good To Be There" (VP Records) Joe Gibbs Scorchers From The Mighty Two Roots Archives Listing
- 2009: Dub Like An Antelope – Legends of Reggae Celebrate Phish – "Bouncing Around the Room ft. Yellow Man" (Red Hillz Music) Dub Like An Antelope Rhapsody Listing
- 2009: Joe Gibbs 12" Reggae Discomix Showcase Vol.2 – "Good To Be There" (17 North Parade)
- 2010: Out Here in the Fields: Legends of Reggae Celebrate the Who – "Who Are You" (Red Hillz Music) Out Here in the Fields Rhapsody Listing
- 2010: Rock on Reggae – "Imagine" (R.B. Puddin) Rock On Reggae Rhapsody Listing
- 2011: Trojan Presents: Dancehall – 40 Sound System Favourites – "Good To Be There" (Spectrum Audio)
