= Skarra Mucci =

Jamaican singer

Skarra Mucci (born Calvin Davis) is a Jamaican singer, MC and reggae artist.

== Career ==
Since migrating from Kingston, Jamaica, to Europe in the 1990s, Skarra Mucci has released eight solo albums and collaborated with dozens of artists. In 2019 he released an EP in collaboration with L'Entourloop called Golden Nuggets.

Skarra Mucci's 2012 album Return of the Raggamuffin won Best Reggae Album in France that year. Skarra Mucci has collaborated with many French artists, including Dub Inc and L'Entourloop. He grew up on the street and continues to be self-reliant as a fiercely independent artist and entrepreneur. Skarra Mucci's music is popular in France, Italy and Mexico.
