= List of wars involving Jamaica =

This is a list of wars and conflicts involving Jamaica.

== Colonial conflicts ==
Conflict	Combatant 1	Combatant 2	Results
Anglo-Spanish War (1654–1660)	Spain: Spanish West Indies	(The Protectorate) Commonwealth of England	Treaties of Madrid (1667 and 1670): The English invasion of Jamaica takes place in May 1655.; Spain formally cedes several territories to England, including Jamaica, in 1670.
First Maroon War (1728–1740)	Windward Maroons Leeward Maroons	(Kingdom of Great Britain) British Empire: Colony of Jamaica	British government offers peace treaties: Cudjoe agrees to stop attacks, not take part in new escapes and help capture slaves; British give Leeward Maroons their freedom, own land, the right to hunt wild pigs and have their own government
Tacky's Revolt (1760–1761)	Coromantee rebels	(Kingdom of Great Britain) Great Britain: Colony of Jamaica; Jamaican Maroons	Defeat of the Coromantee rebels: Revolt suppressed
Second Maroon War (1795–1796)	Maroons from Cudjoe's Town and allies	(Kingdom of Great Britain) British Empire: Colony of Jamaica; Accompong town	Defeat of the Jamaican Maroons: Maroon surrender; The Barbado/Bumbo Treaty
Baptist War (1831–1832)	Slave rebels	Colony of Jamaica	Defeat of the Slave rebels: Rebellion suppressed
Morant Bay rebellion (1865)	Jamaicans from Morant Bay (Jamaica Committee)	(Kingdom of Great Britain) British Empire	Failure of Jamaican rebels: Phillips v Eyre decided in Eyre's favour; Rebellion used as a justification for more centralized control of Britain's empire

American Revolutionary War:

- Action of 15 January 1782
- Action of 17 February 1783

== Post-independence ==
Conflict	Combatant 1	Combatant 2	Results
Invasion of Grenada (1983)	United States; Barbados; Jamaica; Organisation of Eastern Caribbean States	People's Revolutionary Government of Grenada; Cuba	Victory: Grenadian dictatorship deposed; Cuban military presence defeated; Restoration of Constitutional Government
