= Willard White =

Jamaican-British operatic bass baritone (born 1946)

The Honourable Sir Willard White OM CBE
- Born: 10 October 1946 (age 80); Kingston, Jamaica
- Occupation: Opera singer

Sir Willard Wentworth White, OM, CBE (born 10 October 1946) is a Jamaican-born British operatic bass baritone.

== Early life ==
White was born into a Jamaican family in Kingston and attended Excelsior High School in Kingston, the same school that produced the poet Louise Bennett-Coverly ("Miss Lou") and the actress Leonie Forbes. His father was a dockworker, his mother a housewife. White first began to learn music by listening to the radio and singing Nat King Cole songs. He was also inspired by the American bass baritone singer and civil rights activist Paul Robeson. White was a founding member of The Jamaican Folk Singers, and trained at the Jamaican School of Music.

In a visit to Jamaica, Evelyn Rothwell, the oboist and wife of conductor Sir John Barbirolli, heard him sing and suggested that he go to study in London. Instead, his father bought him a one-way ticket to New York City, because "the flight was cheaper". He won a scholarship and continued his studies with bass Giorgio Tozzi at the Juilliard School. While at Juilliard, he was selected by Maria Callas to participate in the master classes she gave there from 1971 to 1972.

== Career ==
In May 1971, White made his debut as the runaway slave Jim in the Juilliard American Opera production of Hall Overton's opera Huckleberry Finn. He next appeared with New York City Opera in 1974 as Colline in La bohème. In 1976, he made his London opera debut with English National Opera as Seneca in Monteverdi's L'incoronazione di Poppea, having starred with Leona Mitchell that year in the first truly complete recording of Porgy and Bess. He has since sung at the Metropolitan Opera, Royal Opera House, Opéra Bastille, the opera houses of San Francisco, Los Angeles, and the major European cities as well as the Festivals at Glyndebourne, Aix-en-Provence, Verbier, and Salzburg.

In addition to covering a wide range of the bass-baritone roles in the standard repertoire by Mozart, Handel, Rossini, Verdi, Puccini and Wagner, White has also explored less traditional territory by appearing as Bluebeard in Bartók's Bluebeard's Castle, Golaud in Debussy's Pelléas and Mélisande, Tchélio in Prokofiev's The Love for Three Oranges, the title role in Messiaen's Saint François d'Assise, Nekrotzar in Ligeti's Le Grand Macabre, Claggart in Britten's Billy Budd, John Adams' El Niño, Nick Shadow in Stravinsky's The Rake's Progress, Creon in Stravinsky's Oedipus Rex, the title role in Mussorgsky's Boris Godunov and Ivan in Khovanshchina.

In 2005 he sang Michael Tippett's A Child of our Time at the First Night of the Proms. His voice was heard as one of the operatic soloists in the Academy Award-winning motion picture Amadeus. Among his most memorable roles are Mephistopheles in Berlioz's The Damnation of Faust and Porgy in Porgy and Bess. He has starred in non-singing roles, such as a Royal Shakespeare Company production of Othello (1989), with Ian McKellen as Iago and Imogen Stubbs as Desdemona. He sang Porgy in the Glyndebourne production (1993) of the opera Porgy and Bess. Both productions were directed by Trevor Nunn and both were videotaped for television. White appeared with Cantamus Girls Choir in Harrogate in 2004.

He has sung the role of Vodnik in Antonín Dvořák's opera Rusalka several times, including in a Stefan Herheim production in 2012 at La Monnaie in Brussels and in 2004 at the Metropolitan Opera, New York.

On 5 June 2019 at Portsmouth, during the ceremony commemorating the 75th anniversary of the Normandy landings, White interpreted in French the "Chant des Partisans", the most popular song of the Free French and French Resistance during World War II, in front of veterans and heads of state including Queen Elizabeth II, Donald Trump and Emmanuel Macron.

In August 2020, White caused some controversy when he refused to sing Oley Speaks' setting of Rudyard Kipling's poem "Mandalay", as a planned part of the UK's VJ commemorations, because it "made him feel uncomfortable".

On 22 May 2021 at the age of 74, he sang the role of Seneca in the premiere of the Vienna State Opera production of Claudio Monteverdi's L'incoronazione di Poppea. In 2022 White sang the role of Count Monterone in Opera North's production of Rigoletto, directed by Femi Elufowoju jr.

== Awards and personal life ==
In 1977, the first stereo recording of Porgy and Bess, conducted by Lorin Maazel, in which White sang the role of Porgy, received a Grammy Award. White himself received the Gold Musgrave Medal of The Institute of Jamaica. In the 1995 New Year Honours, he was appointed Commander of the Order of the British Empire (CBE), and he was knighted as a Knight Bachelor in the 2004 Birthday Honours, in both cases for services to music. In 2000, White was awarded the Jamaican Order of Merit (OM), then the third highest honour in the Jamaican honours system, for eminent international distinction in the performing arts. This entitles him to the prenominal style "The Honourable". He was appointed a Knight of the Legion of Honour, France's highest national order, in 2023.

White lives in Lewisham, South East London.

== Selected discography ==
- Wagner: Die Walküre as Wotan with Eva Johansson, Robert Gambill, Lilli Paasikivi, Eva-Maria Westbroek, Berlin Philharmonic, Simon Rattle, Festival Aix-en-Provence, DVD
- Berlioz: La damnation de Faust as Mephistopheles with Veselina Kasarova, Paul Groves, Salzburg Festival, Sylvain Cambreling, DVD
- Porgy and Bess with Leona Mitchell, Barbara Hendricks, Florence Quivar, and others, the Cleveland Orchestra and Chorus conducted by Lorin Maazel. This is the first truly complete recording of Porgy and Bess ever made. Decca (London Records in the US)
- The Paul Robeson Legacy (2002), a collection of spirituals and ballads made famous by Paul Robeson, arranged specially for Willard White. Linn Records AKD 190, (with Guy Barker, trumpet)
- Willard White – A Gala Celebration: Carl Davis: "Three Spirituals", "On The Beach (Whitman)", Copland: "Old American Songs", opera arias by Mozart and Gounod, Bizet's "Pearl Fishers' Duet", and Broadway numbers including "Some Enchanted Evening" and "Ol' Man River". With Bonaventura Bottone, tenor, Royal Liverpool Philharmonic Choir and Royal Liverpool Philharmonic, cond. Carl Davis, conductor. RLCD 204
- Porgy and Bess with Cynthia Haymon, Harolyn Blackwell, Glyndebourne Chorus and London Philharmonic Orchestra, conducted by Simon Rattle. Another complete recording of the opera, and the basis for the 1993 television production. EMI.
- Mozart: Requiem with Barbara Bonney, Anne Sofie von Otter, Monteverdi Choir, English Baroque Soloists conducted by Sir John Eliot Gardiner.
- Handel: Messiah with Yvonne Kenny, Jean Rigby and Thomas Randle, with the Royal Choral Society and the Royal Philharmonic Orchestra, conducted by Owain Arwel Hughes.
- Dvořák: Rusalka, 2012 production at La Monnaie, released 2014 on EuroArts DVD, Blu-ray.
