= List of post-nominal letters (Jamaica) =

Post-nominal letters in Jamaica include:

| Office | Post-nominal |
|---|---|
Honours System
| The Order of National Hero | None (Note: Members of the Order of National Hero do not use post-nominal letters. They instead "The Right Excellent" before their names and "National Hero of Jamaica" after their names.) |
| The Order of the Nation | ON (Note: In addition to the post-nominal letters ON, members of the Order of the Nation use "The Most Honourable" before their names.) |
| The Order of Jamaica | OJ (Note: Honorary Members must utilise OJ {hon} instead. Members are entitled to use "The Honourable" before their names.) |
Order of Distinction (Note: Honorary Appointments must use the letters CD (hon) or OD (hon).)
| Commander | CD |
| Officer | OD |

== See also ==
- Lists of post-nominal letters
