= Olive Lewin =

Jamaican anthropologist, ethnomusicologist and writer (1927–2013)

The Honourable Olive Lewin OM OJ OD
- Born: Olive Wilhelmina Mahoney Lewin; September 28, 1927; Clarendon, Jamaica
- Died: April 10, 2013 (aged 85); Kingston, Jamaica
- Occupations: Author; social anthropologist; musicologist; teacher
- Children: 1
- Awards: Musgrave Medal (1987); Order of Distinction (2001); Order of Merit (Jamaica) (2003)
- Writing career
- Years active: 1970-2013
- Notable works: Alle, Alle, Alle; Dandy Shandy; Forty Folk Songs of Jamaica

Olive Wilhelmina Mahoney Lewin OM OJ OD (28 September 1927 – 10 April 2013) was a Jamaican author, social anthropologist, musicologist, and teacher. She is best known for her recorded anthologies of old Jamaican folk music songs, researched and collected over her lifetime.

== Biography ==
Olive Lewin was born in Vere, in Clarendon, Jamaica, to teachers. She studied music and ethnomusicology in the United Kingdom. She is a Fellow of Trinity College, London, and an Associate of the Royal Academy of Music and the Royal School of Music. She also held the position of Director of Arts and Culture at the office of the Prime Minister of Jamaica as well as that of Director of the Jamaica Institute of Folk Culture. From 1983 she directed the Jamaica Orchestra for Youth.

Lewin was the author of several books and has made numerous recordings of folk music, performed by the Jamaican Folk Singers, which she founded. She was honoured by the Government of Jamaica, the United Nations, the Organization of American States, the Government of France and by academia for her outstanding lifelong contribution to the arts. In 2001 she was awarded the Jamaican Order of Distinction.

She preferred to present her collections of old Jamaican folk songs through concerts, and useful recordings are difficult to find. Some of her collected folk songs can be found on the internet but most of the few original recordings are very difficult to find since the original reel-to-reel tapes have deteriorated and the 33 rpm records are now scarce. In 1987 she was awarded the Musgrave Gold Medal by the Institute of Jamaica.

== Death ==
Lewin died in a Kingston hospital on 10 April 2013, aged 85. She was surivived by two grandchildren and her daughter, Major Joanna Lewin, the first female helicopter pilot in the Jamaican Defense Force. She was given a State funeral at the University Chapel in St Andrew on Saturday, 27 August 2013. Her body was interred in the churchyard of the St James Anglican Church in Hayes, Clarendon. A report of Edward Seaga's tribute to her was reproduced in Jamaica Obsrver as follows:

'I asked her to take up the assignment of collecting the folk music that was not yet recorded so as to complete the inventory of our musical soul,' said Seaga. 'She set about the task with a fervent mission. Every parish was her stomping ground. After several years of compiling a rich collection, she completed that phase of her mission. The next phase was the performance of the music, to open the door wider to this cultural wonderland.

'I wish, [and] I could feel it in my heart, that she was fully recognized in her own life,' said Seaga, breaking into tears as his wife Carla moved to comfort him at the podium. 'She goes to her grave only partly covered in the glory she deserves.

'But God knows this woman of grace, this missionary of our music, this cultural ambassador was a heavenly icon, and he will do the rest to grace her soul as she deserves'.

In October 2013 Lewin was posthumously awarded the Order of Merit by the Jamaican government.

== Legacy ==
Between 1951 and 1965, Olive Lewin taught at the Mico Teacher Training College, where highly regarded cultural roots reggae artists such as Milton Henry, Augustus Pablo and Horace Andy learned their crafts and later paid their regards to Olive Lewin for her profound influence on their careers and understanding of music.

In 2014, Nova Southeastern University's Olive Lewin Heritage Foundation was dedicated to Lewin, launched by Seaga.

== Works by Olive Lewin ==
- Alle, Alle, Alle: 12 Jamaican Folk Songs (London: Oxford UP) 1977. Music scores incl.
- Beeny Budd: 12 Jamaican Folk-songs for Children (London: Oxford UP) 1975.
- Brown Gal in the Ring: 12 Jamaican Folk Songs, Collected and Arranged for Schools (London: Oxford UP), 1974.
- Dandy Shandy: 12 Folk-songs for children (London: Oxford UP), 1975. Folklore. Music. Songs. Jamaica.
- Forty Folk Songs of Jamaica (Washington, DC: OAS), 107 pp., 1 map, 1973.
- Some Jamaican Folk Songs (Kingston: Oxford Group Publishers), 1970. A collection of 36 folk songs, including scores.
- "Mento", in The New Grove Dictionary of Music and Musicians, 2nd edition, vol. 16, pp. 435–6 (London: Macmillan Publishers), 2001.
- Rock It Come Over: the Folk Music of Jamaica (Kingston: University of the West Indies Press), 2000. Map, Illustrations, foreword, Introduction, Preface, Acknowledgments, References, Indexes, and chapters as follows:

I. Introduction

1. The Making of a Musician
2. Slavery:
3. Conflicting Concepts of Wealth

II. Non-Cult Traditional Jamaican Music

4. Music for Work, Play and the Spirit
5. Mento and Other Styles for Dance, Entertainment and Ceremony

III. Cults and Cult Music in Jamaica

6. Maroon, Tambo, Goombeh, Ettu, Nago
7. Revivalism and Rastafarianism

IV. Kumina and Queenie Kennedy

8. The Kumina Cult
9. Queenie Kennedy: Her Life
10. Queenie Kennedy: Her Teachings and Her Work
11. Conclusion
