= New Day (novel) =

1949 book by V. S. Reid

- First edition
- Author: V. S. Reid
- Language: English
- Genre: Historical novel
- Publisher: Alfred A. Knopf
- Publication date: 1949
- Publication place: Jamaica
- Media type: Print

New Day is a 1949 book by Jamaican author V. S. Reid. It was Reid's first novel. New Day deals with the political history of Jamaica as told by a character named Campbell, who is a boy at the time of the Morant Bay Rebellion (in 1865) and an old man during its final chapters. It may have been the first novel to use Jamaican vernacular as its language of narration.

Reid employed the Jamaican dialect as a springboard for creating a distinctive literary variant and for achieving a greater depth in the English language. Reid was motivated to write New Day by his discontentment with how the leaders George William Gordon and Paul Bogle of the Morant Bay Rebellion (1865) were depicted in the foreign press; by reworking as characters in his novel those who had been negatively portrayed as rebels, he aimed to refute what he viewed as unfair misrepresentations of history. The Morant Bay uprising also provided the historical backdrop for a number of works written by Reid's literary counterparts, most notably fellow Jamaican writer Roger Mais. Mais's 1938 play George William Gordon also functioned to repair the historical figure Gordon, who had been portrayed as a villain in prevailing narratives of colonialism, as a martyr and hero for Jamaican nationalism. On its release, Reid's fictional and historical narrative was well received by the literary audience and "caught hold of people's imagination in a kind of way that [Reid] couldn't imagine would happen in Jamaica."

== Plot summary ==
New Day recounts the story of Jamaica's first post-emancipation rebellion against colonial rule that cemented a stifling socio-economic and political framework three decades after the abolition of slavery. The novel is framed as the aged narrator John Campbell's account of the Morant Bay Rebellion of 1865 and the series of uprisings and negotiations that finally culminates in the creation of the New Constitution in 1944.

Recognized for its particular approach to the historical novel, the narrative opens with the elderly narrator John Campbell reminiscing of his family and country's long-standing history over the course of 79 years, as he lies awake on the eve of Jamaica's Constitution Day and his memory refuses to elude him. The narrative quality of New Day is evident when the aged narrator transitions from past-tense into present voice as old Campbell struggles to recall the events of the past ("remember I remember").

The protagonist John Campbell, of mixed African and European descent, is a member of a family that has risen to greater standing with each generation. Since the abolition of slavery, Campbell explains that the large estates in Jamaica have ceased to function. Many droughts devastate the island and the state of the Afro-Jamaican population only worsens. Anger and resentment grow towards the Governor's administration and the wealthy land-owners, in turn sparking the Morant Bay Rebellion. John's older brother Davie Campbell, whom John idolizes, joins forces with the Jamaican radicals of Stoney Gut. The colonial militia open fire on and kill forty men from Stoney Gut and Morant Bay. The rebels kill 40 militiamen in retaliation.

Although John's father, Pa John Campbell, is a peaceful and devoted Christian, he and all of his family, excluding John and Davie, are eventually killed by the time Governor Eyre eventually stops the reign of terror that he deemed to be the solution to the rebellion. Subsequently, John escapes with Davie and Lucille Dubois, the girl who marries Davie. The three proceed to live on a small cay until the colonial authorities have stopped hunting them. It is not James Creary, son of Lucille and David, but their grandson Garth Creary who assumes leadership in the struggle. Garth, a wealthy lawyer and businessman, is ultimately responsible for executing the series of propaganda, lawsuits, strikes, and negotiations that eventually pave the way for a new Jamaican constitution. The new political day is celebrated on the morning following old John Campbell's long and restless night. Jamaica's partial self-government gives way to the country's "New Day".

== Style ==
In the interest of readership and commercial viability, Reid crafted the language of narration in New Day as a merging of Jamaican dialect and standard English. Reid intended for the novel to transcend language barriers and to be understood by all literary audiences who could read English, while still retaining "the beautiful rhythm of all the West Indian English-speaking people."

The novel is divided into three parts: Part One is written in the modified Jamaican dialect, the language of narration in Part Two contains a diluted rendering of the same Jamaican vernacular, and Part Three is written entirely in traditional English.

The use of nation dialect as the language of narration is evident in a passage taken from Reid's New Day:

"Father stopped quick, his breath going with rush. Surprise there was on him, which made me wonder why; for Naomi and me knew well about Moses and my sis Ruthie. When we reached home, I asked Naomi why surprise should ha' taken Father, but she laughed and said all menfolk were fool-fool….But I am a-tell you of Father's voice that night. When he lifted his coco-macca stick and dropped it on Moses's shoulder, heard I heard in his voice all what I hear now as he shouts at my bro' Davie." (p. 20)

Here, the repetition of "fool" and "heard" is employed for stylistic purposes of emphasis and rhythm, which both confer the dialect usage its distinctive and poetic character. Moreover, the author's recurrent use of inversions such as "surprise there was on him" and elisions such as "ha' " (to denote have) further operate as Reid's loose adaptations of Jamaican speech. Reid's reworking of Jamaican spoken word also manifests itself in the use of Jamaican adverbs such as "quick" in lieu of the standard English adverb "quickly".

Reid's use of Jamaican dialect may have derived from his passion for music and the desire to uphold a "stately but natural rhythm in writing".

== See also ==
- Nation language
