= George W. Gordon =

George W. Gordon can refer to:

- George William Gordon (c. 1820–65), Jamaican businessman, magistrate and politician
- George Washington Gordon (1836–1911), American Civil War general, politician, and Ku Klux Klan member
