= Carl Stone (sociologist) =

Jamaican political sociologist (1940–1993)

The Honourable Carl Stone OM CD
- Born: Carl Ebenezer McDougall Stone; 3 June 1940; St Elizabeth, Colony of Jamaica, British Empire
- Died: 26 February 1993 (aged 52); Kingston, Jamaica
- Occupations: Political sociologist; pollster; university professor; non-fiction writer; columnist
- Children: 2

Academic background
- Education: University of the West Indies (BSc); University of Michigan (MA, PhD)

Academic work
- Discipline: Political sociology; psephology
- Institutions: University of Michigan; University of the West Indies

Carl Ebenezer McDougall Stone OM CD (3 June 1940 – 26 February 1993) was a Jamaican political behaviouralist, psephologist, pollster and professor of political sociology at the University of the West Indies, Mona. He successfully predicted the victorious parties of all national elections held in Jamaica between 1976 and 1990. Stone was also a newspaper columnist for The Gleaner and the author or editor of more than 14 books and published government reports. In 1993, Stone died at the age of 52 from complications related to HIV/AIDS.

== Early life and education ==
Carl Ebenezer McDougall Stone was born on 3 June 1940 in Saint Elizabeth, Jamaica, to the carpenter Eric Stone and his wife, teacher Flossie McDougal-Stone. He was educated initially at Happy Grove School in Portland before going on to Wolmer's Boys School and then Kingston College. After leaving secondary school, Stone worked as an executive officer in the Office of the Town Clark at the Kingston and Saint Andrew Corporation (KSAC). He later enrolled at the University of the West Indies, graduating in 1968 with a Bachelor of Science degree in Government. He went on to the University of Michigan in the United States, where he attained his Master of Arts degree and doctorate, both in Political Science.

== Career and thought ==
From 1970 to 1971, Stone lectured at the University of Michigan, returning to Jamaica in 1972 to take up a position at the University of the West Indies, Mona; he became a senior lecturer two years later. Stone became a reader in politicial sociology in 1978 and gained his professorship in 1983.

In 1972, Stone was instrumental in introducing public opinion polling to the Jamaican political process which he combined with empirical data to accurately predict the outcomes of all national elections held in Jamaica between 1976 and 1990; in several instances, Stone accurately predicted election results based on percentage of votes received and constituency seats. By the mid-1980s, "Stone Polls", commissioned both privately and by The Gleaner who published them, were fixtures of political strategy and media coverage in Jamaica.

Jamaican academic Brian Meeks writes that Stone's thought can be stratified into three distinct periods: The first, epitomised by his book Class, Race and Political Behaviour in Urban Jamaica (1973), can be seen to be a response by Stone in his early career to the radical turn towards the left seen in Jamaican politics and the surge of political violence of that time.

In the 1980s, Stone attempted to synthesise a comprehensive schema of political states in the developing world along a democratic–authoritarian continuum. This work culminated in his 1980 book Understanding Third World Politics and Economics, wherein Stone posits links between styles of government power management with economic progress. In this period, Stone also posited a theory for understanding the unique success of Jamaica as an ex-colonial democracy based on the Westminster system, in light of this system's failure to be maintained in other former British colonial possessions such as Nigeria, Ghana, Sierra Leone, Kenya, Uganda or Tanzania. In his 1983 book Democracy and Clientelism in Jamaica, Stone explains this phenomenon as being the result of a clientelist democracy under which the lower classes perceive their material needs as likely to be met by the success of their preferred party. This confidence minimises conditions which ferment tensions between various racial and social demographics as well as calls of political reform. The academic Carlene J. Edie writes that this work enshrined clientelism into policy consideration in the Jamaican political apparatus. Meeks identifies Democracy and Clientelism in Jamaica as epitomising the second period of Stone's thought in which he successfully identifies the causes of Jamaica's narrow avoidance of civil war in the tumultuous 1976–78 period.

Stone also analysed Jamaican voting tendencies in light of the cults of personality surrounding early post-independence party leaders such as Sir Alexander Bustamante of the conservative Jamaican Labour Party (JLP) and Michael Manley of the social-democratic People's National Party (PNP).

Meeks argues that the final phase of Stone's career was not defined by a single publications but by his newspaper columns in which he described "the new conditions of uni-polarity and globalization" the end of the century, conscious of his own terminal illness.

== Honours and awards ==
Stone was the recipient of both the Woodrow Wilson and Fulbright Fellowships from 1980–81. Also in 1981, he was appointed to the Order of Distinction (Commander Class), "for services in the field of Scholarship and Research". Stone was appointed to the Order of Merit in 1993, only days before his death.

== Personal life and death ==
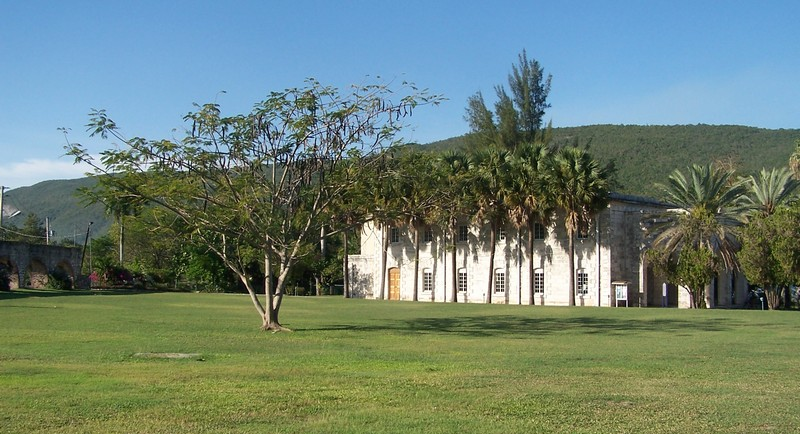
University Chapel at UWI Mona.

Carl Stone married Rosemarie on 28 June 1975; he had been married previously. Stone died at his home in Kingston on 26 February 1993 at the age of 52 and was survived by his wife and two children. His funeral at Mona's University Chapel was attended both by Prime Minister P. J. Patterson and Leader of the Opposition Edward Seaga. The Professor Carl Stone Scholarship Fund is dedicated to Stone and was announced at his funeral.

It was initially reported that Stone had died from leukemia, however Stone's widow later explained in her memoir No Stone Unturned: The Carl and Rosie Story (published by Ian Randle in 2007), that his death was due to complications from HIV/AIDS, which she had also contracted. The disease, as well as male homosexuality with which it is often associated, are taboo in Jamaica and sexual intercourse between men is punishable by imprisonment. Rosemarie Stone, in the Jamaica Observer, disclosed that Carl Stone had contracted HIV from one of multiple extramarital affairs he admitted to having with women.

== Select bibliography ==
According to Brian Meeks, Stone was the author of "some eight books, three monographs, co-editing of three others and over fifty articles". A selection of these are listed below:

Year	Title	Publisher	ISBN	Pages	Note
1972	Stratification and political change in Trinidad and Jamaica	Sage Publications	0803901445	39	
1978	Experiment in Low Income Housing in Jamaica: an Evaluation	University of the West Indies Press	9780878556830 (Later Transaction Publishers edition)	275	Originally published by the Institute of Social and Economic Research, an imprint of the UWIP based at the University's Mona campus in Jamaica; as part of the Sites and Services Evaluation Project. Co-edited by Marie Sutherland.
1983	Democracy and Clientelism in Jamaica	Transaction Publishers	9780878553488	262	As part of the Inter-American Politics Series.
1983	The Newer Caribbean: Decolonization, Democracy, and Development	Institute for the Study of Human Issues	0897270495	348	Co-edited with Paget Henry.
1985	Power in the Caribbean Basin: A Comparative Study of Political Economy	Institute for the Study of Human Issues	9780897270564	159	As part of the Inter-American Politics Series.
1986	Class, State, and Democracy in Jamaica	Praeger Publishers	9780275920135	198	As part of the series Politics of Latin America, published by the Hoover Institute.
1989	Carl Stone on Jamaican Politics, Economics & Society	Gleaner Company	9789766120108	118	A collection of 49 newspaper columns published in The Gleaner from 1987–89.
1989	Politics Versus Economics: the 1989 Elections in Jamaica	Heinemann Publishers	9766050864	170	

=== Select essays ===
- Stone, Carl (1985). "Jamaica in Crisis: From Socialist to Capitalist Management". International Journal. 40 (2): 282–311. doi:10.2307/40202260. JSTOR 40202260.
- ——— (1974). "Race and Nationalism in Urban Jamaica". Caribbean Studies. 13 (4): 5–32. JSTOR 25612569.
- ——— (1978). "Regional Party Voting in Jamaica (1959–1976)". Journal of Interamerican Studies and World Affairs. 20 (4): 393–420. doi:10.2307/165443. JSTOR 165443.
- ——— (1985). "The Jamaican Public and the University of the West Indies". Caribbean Quarterly. 31 (3/4): 31–40. doi:10.1080/00086495.1985.11829406. JSTOR 40653635.

== Criticism and further reading ==
- Lindahl, Folke (1994). "Caribbean Diversity and Ideological Conformism: The Crisis of Marxism in the English-Speaking Caribbean". Social and Economic Studies. 48 (3): 57–74. ISSN 0037-7651. JSTOR 27865975.
