= Nation language =

Sociolinguistic alternative to "creole" or "pidgin" labels

"Nation language" is the term coined by scholar and poet Kamau Brathwaite that is now commonly preferred to describe the use of non-standard English in the work of writers from the Caribbean and the African diaspora, as opposed to the traditional designation of it as "dialect", which Brathwaite considered carries pejorative connotations that are inappropriate and limiting.

In the words of Brathwaite, considered the authority of note on nation language and a key exemplar of its use:

We in the Caribbean have a [...] kind of plurality: we have English, which is the imposed language on much of the archipelago. It is an imperial language, as are French, Dutch and Spanish. We also have what we call creole English, which is a mixture of English and an adaptation that English took in the new environment of the Caribbean when it became mixed with the other imported languages. We have also what is called nation language, which is the kind of English spoken by the people who were brought to the Caribbean, not the official English now, but the language of slaves and labourers, the servants who were brought in.

Writers who also notably use nation language include Samuel Selvon, Louise Bennett, John Figueroa, Archie Markham, Linton Kwesi Johnson, Marc Matthews, John Agard, Jean Binta Breeze, as well as others of a younger generation. Poet and scholar Mervyn Morris ("one of the first academics to espouse the importance of nation language in helping to define in verse important aspects of Jamaican culture", according to Ralph Thompson) identifies V. S. Reid's 1949 novel New Day as the first literary work to use Jamaican vernacular as the language of narration.

In his History of the Voice (1984), Brathwaite discusses the prominence of pentameter in English poetic tradition, claiming that since the time of Chaucer, and with a few notable exceptions, pentameter has been the prevailing rhythm of English poetry. Brathwaite suggests that such imported literary forms may not be suitable to express the Caribbean experience. He writes, "The hurricane does not roar in pentameters." It is here that nation language becomes of use to the Caribbean poet:

It is nation language in the Caribbean that, in fact, largely ignores the pentameter. Nation language is the language which is influenced very strongly by the African model, the African aspect of our New World/Caribbean heritage. English it may be in terms of some of its lexical features. But in its contours, its rhythm and its timbre, its sound explosions, it is not English, even though the words, as you hear them, might be English to a greater or lesser degree.

Brathwaite describes reading an article by the Martinican poet and critic Édouard Glissant, in which Glissant describes nation language as a "forced poetics" because it was used strategically by slaves in order to both disguise and maintain their culture.

== See also ==
- Jamaican patois
- Creole language
- Guyanese Creole
- Spanglish
- Trinidadian and Tobagonian English
