= Order of Excellence (Jamaica) =

National order of the Jamaican honour system

- Type: Order
- Presented by: Jamaica
- Eligibility: Foreign Heads of State or Government
- Motto: Excellence through Service
- Established: 2003

Highlights
- Total recipients: 4
- Neck ribbon Sash ribbon

Precedence
- Next (higher): Order of the National Hero
- Equivalent: Order of the Nation
- Next (lower): Order of Merit

The Order of Excellence is one of the six national orders of the Jamaican honours system, and it is awarded only to present and former foreign Heads of State or Government. The Order of Excellence is the most recent honour to be created, having been brought into being in 2003. The Order of Excellence took over the function of the Order of Merit, which is now awarded to "persons of notable achievement in particular fields of study".

== Recipients ==
| Thabo Mbeki | South Africa | 1 July 2003 |
| King Juan Carlos I of Spain | Spain | 17 February 2009 |
| Jakaya Kikwete | Tanzania | 25 November 2009 |
| Danilo Medina | Dominican Republic | 27 November 2017 |
