= 1884 Jamaican general election =

General elections were held in Jamaica on 11 and 12 September 1884. Four of the nine seats were uncontested; Clarendon, Manchester, St Mary & St Ann and Westmoreland & Hanover. Of the winning candidates, all but one (who was mixed-race) were white. Supporters of the sugar industry won in seven constituencies, only failing to win St Catherine and Kingston & St Andrews, where sugar was not the primary economic interest. Winning candidates were not exclusively driven by support for the industry however, and often had significant political histories. Palache, a mixed-race Jewish solicitor who won in Manchester, was the only winning candidate from a non-agricultural or plantation background.

In the St Thomas & Portland constituency George Henderson, a former member of the old House of Assembly, faced a strong contest from Richard Hill Jackson. Jackson was the only black candidate in the election, although race was not considered to have played a prominent role in either St Thomas & Portland or the wider election.

Kingston & St Andrews saw the fiercest contest, and was compared by a local newspaper to electioneering in the United States. George Solomon, a prominent leader of the movement for constitutional change who had the support of most of Kingston's newspapers, was defeated by William Malabre, a prominent merchant. Supporters of Malabre had attacked Solomon's Jewish background, although the main cause of his defeat was the decision by Samuel Burke, a Crown Solicitor particularly popular in St Andrews, to support Malabre after Solomon had declined to support Burke's own nomination due to Burke's status as a government official.

== Background ==
In 1866 the Jamaican House of Assembly had been abolished during disturbances on the island following the Morant Bay rebellion. Since then, the legislative functions of the Assembly had been used by a Council appointed by the Governor. In April 1884 a conference was at the Westminster Palace Hotel, which resulted in the re-establishment of an elected Assembly. The new Assembly would consist of nine elected members and six appointed members.

Under the new constitution, there were 9,176 voters out of a population of 600,000. This compared to 1,798 voters from a population of 450,000 in the last election in 1863.

== Results ==
District	Candidate	Votes
Clarendon	Robert Craig	Unopposed
Kingston & St Andrews	William Malabre	419
Kingston & St Andrews	Charles Lauchlin Campbell	335
Kingston & St Andrews	George Solomon	272
Kingston & St Andrews	William Kelly Smith	1
Manchester	John Thomson Palache	Unopposed
St Catherine	Emanuel George Levy	547
St Catherine	Thomas Harvey	267
St Elizabeth	James Miller Farquharson	532
St Elizabeth	Arthur Levy	173
St James & Trelawny	Edward Gooden Barrett	437
St James & Trelawny	William Kerr	140
St Mary & St Ann	Michael Solomon	Unopposed
St Thomas & Portland	George Henderson	303
St Thomas & Portland	Richard Hill Jackson	232
St Thomas & Portland	Henry Vendryes	73
Westmoreland & Hanover	Charles Salmon Farquharson	Unopposed
Source: The Daily Gleaner

== By-elections ==
Wellesley Bourke was elected in 1885 replacing Edward Gooden Barrett, who had resigned.

William Bancroft Espeut was elected in 1886 replacing George Henderson, who had resigned.

Thomas Lloyd Harvey was elected in October 1886 after Emanuel George Levy died.

John Powell Clark was elected 1888 replacing John Thomson Palache, who had resigned.
