= Psephology =

Quantitative scientific analysis of elections and balloting (within political science)

Psephology (/sɪˈfɒlədʒi/; from Greek ψῆφος, psephos, 'pebble') is the study of elections and voting. Psephology attempts to both forecast and explain election results. The term is more common in British English.

Psephology uses historical precinct voting data, public opinion polls, campaign finance information and similar statistical data. The term was coined in 1948 by W. F. R. Hardie (1902–1990) in the United Kingdom after R. B. McCallum, a friend of Hardie's, requested a word to describe the study of elections. Its first documented usage in writing appeared in 1952.

== Etymology ==
The term draws from the Greek word for pebble as the ancient Greeks used pebbles to vote. (Similarly, the word "ballot" is derived from the medieval French word "ballotte", meaning a small ball.)

== Applications ==
Psephology is a division of political science that deals with the examination as well as the statistical analysis of elections and polls. People who practise psephology are called psephologists.

A few of the major tools that are used by a psephologist are historical precinct voting data, campaign finance information, and other related data. Public opinion polls also play an important role in psephology. Psephology also has various applications specifically in analysing the results of election returns for current indicators, as opposed to predictive purposes. For instance, the Gallagher Index measures the amount of proportional representation in an election.

Degrees in psephology are not offered (instead, a psephologist might have a degree in political science and/or statistics). Knowledge of demographics, statistical analysis and politics (especially electoral systems and voting behaviour) are prerequisites for becoming a psephologist.

== Notable psephologists ==
Notable psephologists include:

- David Andrews, who since 1973 has led the Canadian network CTV's analysis and "calling" of dozens of federal and elections and referendums
- Michael Barone, who has co-authored The Almanac of American Politics biennially since 1972
- Kevin Bonham, Tasmanian and Australian election analyst.
- John Bowman
- Walter Dean Burnham
- Maurice de Hond
- David Butler and Robert McKenzie, who co-developed the swingometer
- Robert Chapman
- Carl Stone, Jamaican Psephologist who held the Order of Merit (Jamaica) before he died.
- Nate Cohn
- Charlie Cook, publisher of The Cook Political Report
- F. W. S. Craig
- John Curtice, who has a strong track record of forecasting UK elections
- Vinod Dua Indian psephologist
- Harry Enten
- Thomas Ferguson, for his Investment theory of party competition
- Michael Gallagher who devised the Gallagher index
- Curtis Gans, author of Voter Turnout in the United States, 1788–2009
- Luis Eduardo González
- Antony Green, election analyst for the Australian Broadcasting Corporation since 1991
- Éric Grenier at thewrit.ca
- Pradeep Gupta, chairman of Axis My India
- Rajeeva Karandikar
- Peter Kellner
- Anthony King
- Steve Kornacki
- Allan Lichtman, professor and creator of The Keys to the White House
- Frank Luntz received the first ever doctorate in campaign technology from Trinity College, Oxford and won the Washington Post Crystal Ball award for most accurate polling
- Malcolm Mackerras (who devised the Mackerras pendulum)
- Robert McKenzie
- G. Elliott Morris
- Helmut Norpoth
- Samuel L. Popkin
- Victor Prescott, who preceded Antony Green as election analyst for the ABC
- V.C. Sekhar, an Indian academic
- Colin Rallings
- Jon Ralston
- Mahesh Rangarajan
- Ken Ritchie
- Prannoy Roy
- Larry Sabato
- Matthew Shugart
- Nate Silver, creator of the website FiveThirtyEight tracking U.S. voting trends
- Matt Singh
- Peter Snow
- Michael Steed
- Andrew S. Tanenbaum and Christopher Bates, who together write the daily electoral-vote.com website, which tracks polling for US presidential and congressional elections
- Michael Thrasher
- Sean Trende
- Dave Wasserman
- Noel Whelan, Irish politician and psephologist
- Yogendra Yadav, Indian politician and psephologist

== See also ==
- British Polling Council
- Electoral Calculus
- Electoral geography
- Opinion poll
- Political analyst
- Political data scientists
- Political forecasting
- Swing (politics)
