= Journals of Expeditions of Discovery into Central Australia =

1845 novel by Edward John Eyre

Journals Of Expeditions Of Discovery Into Central Australia, And Overland From Adelaide To King George's Sound, In The Years 1840-1
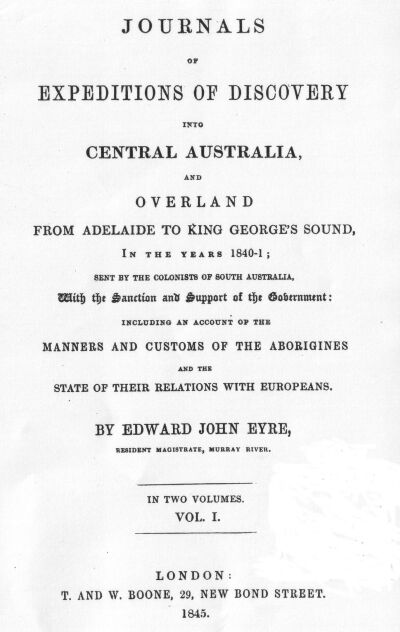
- Frontispiece from the first edition
- Author: Edward John Eyre
- Original title: Journals of Expeditions of Discovery into Central Australia and Overland from Adelaide to King George's Sound in the Years 1840-1: Sent By the Colonists of South Australia, with the Sanction and Support of the Government: Including an Account of the Manners and Customs of the Aborigines and the State of Their Relations with Europeans.
- Cover artist: Samuel Thomas Gill
- Language: English
- Genre: Adventure, Travel literature, Historical nonfiction
- Publisher: T. & W. Boone
- Publication date: 1845
- Publication place: United Kingdom
- Media type: Print

Journals of Expeditions of Discovery into Central Australia (Note: Full title: Journals of Expeditions of Discovery into Central Australia and Overland from Adelaide to King George's Sound in the Years 1840-1: Sent By the Colonists of South Australia, with the Sanction and Support of the Government: Including an Account of the Manners and Customs of the Aborigines and the State of Their Relations with Europeans.) is a Non-fiction novel written by the named explorer and colonist of the early Australia and other varies British colonies, Edward John Eyre. The main content of this book is derived from the travelogue of Mr. Eyre’s one year expedition trip started from Adelaide into mainland of the country and ended after he boarded a ship in King George’s Sound heading back to Adelaide. After returning, Eyre were suggesting to the Governor George Gipps the idea to lead another exploration from Moreton Bay to Port Essington but was instead appointed to resident magistrate and protector of Aborigines at River Murray and the experience and knowledge of dealing with the Aboriginals from this position form the basis of the sections of Account of the Manners and Customs of the Aborigines and the State of Their Relations with Europeans part of the book.

As an autobiography of Edward John Eyre, this book was written in the forms of epistolary and confessional. According to Evans (2008), Mr. Eyre made his name early through being an overlander of sheep and cattle as an immigrant from England, which is to plan the route of livestock in the 1830s south-eastern Australia. After receiving certain name recognition among the colony, he became an explorer and after several expeditions including this one described in the book, eventually a governor of Jamaica. In Australia, in honour of his contribution as an explorer, several locations were named after him including Eyre Highway which runs through the similar route as this expedition and Lake Eyre in South Australia first discovered by Eyre also in this expedition. As mentioned early in the book, this expedition was funded in majority by subscriptions of the colonists and Mr. Eyre ‘s personal contribution, in minority by the donations from colonial government. The expedition in total costs 1391 pounds. Eight members of the expedition party includes Mr. Eyre and his assistant, a Royal Sappers, two person driving six horse dray and two Aboriginals guide, along with 13 horses and 40 sheep.

Eyre prepared them for publication while en route to London by ship in December 1844, which eventually arrived on 11 May 1845. One fellow passenger by the name of Anthony Forster whom Eyre had expressed gratitude on the preface section of the book help examining and correcting numerous errors of the manuscripts. In 1845, the first edition were published in two volumes with illustrations from Samuel Thomas Gill by publisher T & W Boone in London and the first review were released in London Spectator on September. The review credited the extraordinary bravery and leadership of Eyre but criticised Eyre's analysis of Aboriginals and that argued that he unable express tolerant towards the similar misbehaviours and shortcoming of uneducated European settlers.

Notably, travelogues of expedition published by early explorer of Australia is not uncommon, other similar books including Journey of Discovery to Port Phillip in Victoria by Hamiliton Hume and West of Centre: A Journey of Discovery Into the Heartland of Australia by Ray Ericksen.

== Plot summary ==
The party left Adelaide late in the morning of June 18, 1840, and after 12 miles of travel, they arrive at their first bivouac site in a place called little Parra. Upon arrival, Eyre had the leisure of reflecting the prospects of the future of this expedition which he described the whole experience as unrealistic and dreamy as they are suddenly thrown into the silence and solitude of the wilds from the crowded civilized life. He describes the main mission of this expedition, which is to penetrate deep into the mainland of Australia and uncover the mystery of the land which was unvisited by anyone except what Eyre described as ‘savages’ and wild beasts and eventually discovers and plant the flag in the habitable part of the region. Eyre worried about the difficulty of the trip late in the night as the rest of the party sleep, because from the experience of expeditions of Eyre in 1839, he concludes that the further in the north of the country, the drearier and desolate the appearance of land become and the difficulty of acquiring water and grass soars as well.

After 8 days of journey through the valley, the great plain and encounter the difficulty of crossing the river through heavy fog, the party discover some grassy and picturesque ranges, which Eyre names its Campbell’s range. Eyre describes this land as scenery, fertile, and the most desirable location among the unoccupied parts of South Australia to raise cattle and sheep. After 3 miles of travel, the party across a high barren open country passing under a peak connected to Campell’s ranges which Eyre names its Spring Hill. Near Spring Hill, the party encounters one scrawny elderly Aboriginal, alone without fire and food. Eyre determined that the man was abandoned by his tribe because the native tribe must travel always through a great extent of land for daily food therefore could not afford to be impeded by travelling with the sick and old. Though Eyre described it took long before he can repress melancholy train of thoughts, the party left the old man behind.

From June to August, the party had several encounters with the Aboriginals alone or in groups, Eyre describes their appearance similarly as ‘improvised and wretched as the country they inhabited.

In the latter part of Eyre’s travel when their party enter the colony of Western Australia, the situation of the party improved to a certain extent. They could occasionally discover tracts of better soil or watercourse with an outlet directly to the ocean. Eyre describes his experience with the natives in this area to be more pleasant and considers them to be friendly, helpful, and civilized. In addition, the ocean in this area was full of foreign whalers mostly from France and United States. The expedition party was later meet and enjoyed the hospitality of a French whaler ship captain despite the tensions between their two countries as the Spectator suggest.

Overall, Eyre described the land discovered by his journey to be mostly arid and barren in the extreme. In Eyre’s summary, he had no important rivers to enumerate and no fertile region to point out for future colonization. The party was constantly dealt with the challenge of finding water and food. However, Eyre stated that in a geographical point of view, he discovered, over the course of around two years, 270 miles of land or 1060 miles of direct distance in the north of Adelaide. Eyre argued that this expedition with other previous discoveries finished the examination of the whole south line of the coast of this continent.

== Controversy about Eyre's approach towards Aboriginals ==
On the contrary to the ruthless reputation of Eyre’s rule over Jamaica, during which time he authorized the execution of George William Gordon a locally elected mixed-race representative of Jamaican Assembly which was an open critic of him for speculation of involvement in the rebellion. This was later led to Eyre being investigated and trialled by the Jamaica Committee from the British Parliament chaired by John Stuart Mill and includes some of the most famous people in Britain at the time such as Charles Darwin and Thomas Henry Huxley. Hume(1998) and Evans (2008) suggest that Eyre uncharacteristically had the reputation of befriending with Aboriginals at that time. In the book, especially, Eyre argued multiple times that contrary to the general perception of the uncivilized and barbaric image of the Aboriginals. The character and behaviours of natives were no different than those of European colonists.

== Aboriginal society as described by Eyre ==
Eyre stated in the book that the character of Aboriginals has been constantly and prejudicially misrepresented to the point which they are reviewed as the most degraded and corrupted people of the human species by the world. However, Eyre argued that if the European colonist were forced to face the similar debased situation and many disadvantages of the natives, they could not exhibit half of moderation or forbearance which Aboriginals currently expressed.

Eyre described that natives often express an attitude of fearless and intrepid, with an ingenuous openness of looks. However, the extremities of females are more attenuated, as Eyre stated and he argued that it is because they have to endure hardship from a young age as wives were treated as slaves in indigenous society and husbands seldom express affections towards them, said Eyre.

The entertainment of adults were one person holding and shaking a bunch of emu feathers tied up together, whilst others trying take it from him. Eyre said that he had witness many times as strong men wrestling together naked for the feathers as sort of athletic exercises. The most common activities at night was dances and plays performed by different tribes. Eyre describes it as the scenes varied extensively but all accompanied by songs.

== Aboriginals and their interaction with Europeans ==
During Eyre’s expedition, on the 12th of October Eyre learned one incident of 12 years old boy who was killed when he was left alone in the station a mile and half away from Eyre’s tent and surrounded by a group of natives seeking food. The boy had engaged in a conflict with them and resulting in the death of one native and himself. Eyre analysis and determine that based on his experience dealing with the Aboriginals that the cause of the incident and many other similar conflicts between the colonists and Aboriginals can be because firstly, natives consider the colonist being in their country the act of intrusion and aggression, secondly, localities selected by colonists are those who considered being suitable for cultivation and grazing which left the natives to the area where water and other resources were scarce, and lastly, laws and customs of the colonists are not necessarily valued and respected by the natives and vice versa.

Some Aboriginals were being educated in the colonist's school and Eyre concluded that Aboriginals children are as apt and intelligent as European children. They can know the alphabet in a few lessons and after several lessons, they were able to understand simple mathematical operations quickly.

Eyre stated that Aboriginals did not have a good perception of money and their behaviours were overall improvidence as any sum has eventually been spent in treating their friends to bread and rice.
