= The Leopard (Reid novel) =

First UK edition (publ. Heinemann)

The Leopard is a novel by Jamaican writer, V. S. Reid. It portrays the hardships of the Kenyan people during the time of the Mau Mau Rebellion. Novels similar to The Leopard, such as Caroline Elkins’s Imperial Reckoning (2005), as well as Ngũgĩ wa Thiong'o’s Petals of Blood (1977) also reflect events during the Mau Mau uprising. The Leopard, however, distinct from any other novel of its kind, mainly focuses on the controversies of human nature with respect to the co-existence of violence and hatred between Africans and Europeans.

Published in 1958, The Leopard, Victor Reid’s second novel, marks a shift from his earlier concerns of illustrating struggles in Jamaica to illustrating a symbolic similarity in Africa. The title is representative of the character in the novel that symbolizes a blend of the counteracting white and black tendencies.

== Plot ==
The novel begins when the main character Nebu, a Kikuyu tribe member, leaves his Mau Mau people to hunt down a white man who is traveling in the African bush. After catching up to the white man who has also brought his son along, Nebu throws a spear at the white man and kills him while simultaneously, the white man shoots at Nebu, injuring his side. After killing the white man, Nebu realizes that it was his old boss, an English planter. As a result of committing this crime, Nebu feels especially obligated to repay the boss, for having previously slept with his white wife. For this reason, he decides to safeguard the boss’ child, who is in truth, biologically his own, and return him to a white community. The decision to bring the child to a white community is a tough one for him, however, for he is himself very injured from the bullet, and also the child is incapable of walking alone, making the journey twice as difficult.

As Nebu carries his son through the bush, the boy, who was raised with mixed emotions towards blacks and whites, continually taunts him. While they travel, they together become closely watched by the leopard, which plots to kill the two concurrently. Nebu’s wound from the bullet continuously weakens him, making him more susceptible to attack from the leopard. At this point, the leopard attacks and brings a tragic ending to the “twisted little cripple’s” life. Before Nebu could spear the leopard, an English army lieutenant shoots at the leopard, killing it instantly.

== Symbolism ==
Reid set his novel in Africa instead of Jamaica to connect the struggle of the African people, which are the true origins of the black Jamaicans, to the oppression of the Jamaican people. Critic Kenneth Ramchand once said, “The West Indian Negro is a descendent of the Africans, and more recently the idea of Africa has been a phase of West-Indian political thinking.”

Upon analysis of The Leopard, Ramchand posed a point of contention as to why the beautiful poetry of the novel included so much violence, and also why the violence is discussed in such “loving terms.” Ramchand concluded that this clash was intended to make the reader aware of the “savage, twisted inhumanity of the men” in the novel. This indicates that Reid most likely used many subtleties to depict very specific situations throughout his novels. For instance, throughout the course of the novel, Reid often associates animalism with whites in order to dehumanize them. The most important symbol, the leopard, is also significant in its literal sense as well as a deeper one. The leopard’s role as a representation of cowardliness is evident when “the leopard understands it, for he avoids the strong and eats the weak.”

Reid also emphasizes the differing tendencies of the blacks and whites attempting to coexist. Throughout the novel, critic Mervyn Morris notes that the blacks are portrayed as being in accordance with nature while the whites are essentially “man made.” They each, however, strive to gain the advantages of the opposing people- that is to say that blacks desire many “white powers” of which they are deprived while whites desire the advantages of being natives of African territories. Furthermore, the relationship between Nebu and his son constitutes, according to Morris, the heart of the novel. Morris contends that Reid employs the son as a symbol of the cultures produced by a meeting of black and white civilizations. This characteristic signifies the love and hate dynamic between groups as well as between individuals.
