= Victor Stafford Reid =

Jamaican writer (1913–1987)

The Honourable V. S. Reid OJ
- Born: 1 May 1913; Kingston, Colony of Jamaica, British Empire
- Died: 25 August 1987 (aged 74)
- Education: Kingston Technical High School
- Known for: Novelist
- Awards: Gold Musgrave Medal (1976), Order of Jamaica (1980)

Victor Stafford Reid OJ (1 May 1913 – 25 August 1987), was a Jamaican writer born in Kingston, Jamaica, who wrote to influence younger generations to embrace local history. He was awarded the silver (1950) and gold (1976) Musgrave Medals, the Order of Jamaica (1980) and the Norman Manley Award for Excellence in Literature in 1981. He was the author of several novels, three of which were aimed towards children; one play production; and several short stories. Two of his most notable works are New Day, "the first West Indian novel to be written throughout in a dialect form", and The Leopard.

As a writer, Reid aimed to instil an awareness of legacy and tradition among the Jamaican people. His writings reflected many of the social and cultural hardships that pervade the time periods illustrated in his literary works. As literary critic Edward Baugh stated, "[Reid's] writing shows a fondness for the rebel with a cause… he wanted people to learn about their heritage through his writing."

Reid was one of a handful of writers to emerge from the new literary and nationalist movement that seized Jamaican sentiment in the period of the late 1930s. From this "new art" surfaced many of Reid's literary contemporaries, including Roger Mais, George Campbell, M. G. Smith, and H. D. Carberry. A common objective among this new generation of writers was an inclination to "break away from Victorianism and to associate with the Jamaican independence movement."

Reid's emphasis on resistance and struggle is reaffirmed in a 1978 lecture he delivered at the Institute of Jamaica on the topic of cultural revolution in Jamaica post-1938. In the address, Reid contended that the collective discontent of the working class majority was the public assertion of a "new brand of loyalty" that situated itself not only beyond, but more importantly, in direct resistance to imperial rule. he was a great person

== Biography ==
Born in Kingston, Jamaica, Victor Reid was the son of Alexander Reid, a businessman who worked in the shipping industry in the United States and married Margaret Reid. Along with his two brothers and one sister, Victor grew up and attended school in Jamaica, graduating from Kingston Technical High School in 1929. He called himself a "city bred" person because of his urban background.

He was initially involved in advertising, journalism, farming and the book trade, before becoming a writer. Because of success in literature, his early life was prosperous. In 1935, he married his wife Monica and they had four children. He held several posts in the Jamaican government, including Chairman of the Jamaica National Trust Commission, and was a Trustee of the Historic Foundation Research Centre in Kingston. Reid was also well travelled, journeying to Great Britain, East Africa and West Africa, Canada and the United States.

== Career ==
His first novel, New Day (1949), chronicles the Morant Bay Rebellion of 1865 and the series of events that led to the establishment of the new Jamaican constitution in 1944. Reid found it difficult to get it published, as his manuscript was written in a different type of language, Creole; he had decided to introduce patois in order to familiarize young Jamaicans with black history as well as to instill pride in their heritage. Luckily, a piece of his work in the Jamaican Gleaner newspaper caught the attention of some magazine people who were visiting the island. This led to his first publication and gave him exposure to the literary world. He was soon editing and writing for Spotlight News Magazine and The Toronto Star. Just after New Day, Reid published a novel he had written for young people entitled Sixty-Five, which also portrays the Morant Bay Rebellion, but "in an easier gentler sort of way."

In the wake of the later Mau Mau Rebellion in Kenya, Reid was inspired to write a novel about the African situation in an attempt to relate that situation to the Jamaican uprising presented in New Day. His representation of this Kenyan rebellion is evidence that he found literary inspiration in these black uprisings. During the time that he was writing The Leopard, he was simultaneously working as an editor of a weekly newspaper called Public Opinion. Once the book was finished, it was "snapped up by an American and English publisher and was published." Reid's reviews on his new novel were well received by its first audience. After publishing his first few novels, he decided to shift from literary works on specific events to focus on educating the younger generation in Jamaica. According to Reid, it was more difficult for him to write children's novels than adult novels, because he "had never written down to children."

Along with his Sixty-Five, Reid also wrote a number of novels for school children including The Young Warriors (1967), which deals with runaway slaves (known as maroons). He also wrote Peter of Mount Ephraim (1971), which dates back to the 1831 Samuel Sharpe slave uprising. His next novel, The Jamaicans, was written in 1976. It commemorates the life of Juan de Bolas, one of the early leaders of the Jamaican Maroons during the English and Spanish quest for supremacy in Jamaica in the mid-17th century. Nanny Town (1983) was Reid's last published novel and portrays Jamaica's original Queen Mother who led the Jamaican Maroons to independence from the English. Reid's final work was a biography of the Jamaican national hero Norman Manley, entitled The Horses of the Morning (1985). Although novels comprised the bulk of Reid's literary body of work, he was also the author of several stories, collected in Fourteen Jamaican Short Stories (1950), and a play entitled Waterford Bar (1959). Furthermore, edited transcripts of lectures delivered by Reid, such as "The Cultural Revolution in Jamaica after 1938" (1978) and "The Writer & His Work: V. S. Reid" (1986), have been reprinted posthumously in texts such as The Routledge Reader in Caribbean Literature and the Journal of West Indian Literature, respectively.

== Literary themes ==
Reid's novels focus on the freedom of black culture and describe the struggles of black people. His works tend to focus primarily on the history, hopes, and powers of the Jamaican people. Through his writing, Reid wanted to break apart the "distortions of history" portrayed by the foreign press, which described Jamaican radicals as criminals. He wrote to prove the innocence of people who were rendered to be the opposite. Reid held that "[he] must discover, somehow, that these people were not the criminals they were thought to be." In a way, he was telling the untold stories of the times.

Another important aspect of Reid's writing included his desire to contribute to the education system. Previously, schools were solely taught from an English perspective and through a colonial lens. Reid, however, wanted people in school to learn about their own heritage through his writing; he wanted people to recognize that blacks, not only Europeans, participated in history. Therefore, Reid wrote novels to be used in Jamaican schools that provided a historical context of their country and heritage.

Reid was also constantly reinventing language through his writing. In his first novel, New Day, he created a newly modified language that combines both the elements of Standard English and the native Creole language. Later, in works such as The Leopard, he integrates a singing prose style of writing.

== Bibliography ==
- New Day (1949); reissued 1973 with Introduction by Mervyn Morris, London: Heinemann Educational Books
- The Leopard (1958), London: Heinemann Educational Books
- Sixty-Five (1960), London: Longman
- The Young Warriors (1967), London: Longman
- Peter of Mount Ephraim (1971), Kingston: Jamaica Publishing House
- The Jamaicans (revised edition 1978), Kingston: Institute of Jamaica
- Nanny Town (1983)
- The Horses of the Morning (1985)
- Call of the Wild (2012), London: Longman
