= Manley West =

The Honourable Manley West OM
- Born: 17 March 1929
- Died: 24 April 2012 (aged 83)
- Education: University of London
- Known for: Glaucoma research
- Scientific career
- Workplaces: University of the West Indies

Manley Elisha West OM (17 March 1929 – 24 April 2012) was a Jamaican pharmacologist who studied the marijuana plant. He investigated medicines for glaucoma.

== Education ==
West was born in Fairy Hill, Portland Parish, Jamaica. He studied at Titchfield High School and later moved to the UK, attendingThames High School in Surrey. Eventually he began to study pharmacology at the University of London. He worked in St Helier Hospital. West remained there for his postgraduate studies, earning a PhD in 1967.

== Research ==
West returned to Jamaica, and was appointed as a lecturer in 1968. In 1969 he was awarded a World Health Organization fellowship to study cancer chemotherapy at the Memorial Sloan Kettering Cancer Center. In 1970 he joined Ottawa University. In 1977 he was awarded the Pan American Health Organization fellowship in applied toxicology. He worked in University of Belgrade. In the late 1970s, West became interested in the medicinal properties of marijuana when he observed a Manchioneal fishing community looking for fish at night. The fishermen had been smoking marijuana.

He was the first Jamaican to be appointed as professor in the University of the West Indies Department of Pharmacology in 1981. He would also serve as Dean of the Faculty of Medical Sciences. In 1985 he joined the University of Cambridge as a British Council Fellow, working with Alan Cuthbert on how drugs cross the membrane of the eye. He attended a conference in the United States, where he heard that marijuana can lower intraocular pressure. He pioneered the use of marijuana as a treatment for Glaucoma, and was co-inventor of canasol with Albert Lockhart. Canasol is still one of the most popular drugs for treating glaucoma. They were awarded a $20,000 CIDA grant to develop to medicine. They went on to co-invent Asmasol. He died on April 24, 2012.

=== Awards ===
- The FAO/United Nations/Jamaica World Food Day “Biodiversity Award”
- 1976 Certificate of Merit from the Government of Canada
- 1981 Institute of Jamaica Centenary Medal for Outstanding Contribution to Natural Sciences
- 1987 Jamaican Order of Merit for contribution to medicine
- 1994 Institute of Jamaica Gold Musgrave Medal
