= Jamaica Labrish =

Jamaica Labrish is a poetry compilation written by Louise Bennett-Coverley. The 1966 version published by Sangsters is 244 pages long with an introduction by Rex Nettleford and includes a four-page glossary, as the poems are written mainly in Jamaican Patois. There are 128 poems in the book, and they tend to follow the ballad-quintrain style of writing. Nettleford says that "read at the proper pace the poem becomes almost a tongue-twister." The poems are sectioned into four parts: "City Life", "War Time", "Politics" and "Jamaica – Now An' Then". Every poem opens up with a small blurb as to what they are about, including historical insight and context.

== Significance, style and text ==
The Oxford Living Dictionary Online says the term "labrish" most likely originated from the phrase "verbal blabber" but is defined literally as "gossip" - the origin of the word being West Indian. Jamaica Labrish is written in patois, which is defined as the “dialect of the common people of a region, differing in various respects from the standard language of the rest of the country”. The online, Urban Dictionary-style website Jamaican Patwah defines labrish as “gossip or chit-chat”.

Rex Nettleford points out an important factor to keep in mind when looking at Louise Bennett’s work, specifically Jamaica Labrish – that most of her work was meant to be performed.

== Introduction by Rex Nettleford ==
In the 1966 publication of Jamaica Labrish, Nettleford's introduction describes Louise Bennett's work as "unique". The introduction explains and praises the nature of Bennett's art: Nettleford claims that “as an artist she knows what is exactly the proof of the pudding and she makes the authenticity of her dialect verses speak for itself”.

Nettleford mentions that there are other poets who do not necessarily view Bennett as a poet. He states: “there are others who would feel it is improper to endow her with the name of poet, though they would generously crown her as the leading entertainer in Jamaica’s comedy-lore, whether on stage, television or radio”. However, Nettleford also points out that Mervyn Morris describes Bennett as “the only poet who has really hit the truth about society through its own language”.

In the last line of the first section of the introduction, Nettleford says that “it is hoped that the volume will reveal Miss Bennett in her multiple roles as an entertainer, as a valid literary figure and as a documenter of aspects of Jamaican life, thought and feeling”.

== Criticism ==
Mervyn Morris is one of the very few people who is considered a critic of Louise Bennett’s work. Nettleford says "Miss Bennett’s writing suffers from not having had a tradition of criticism. Mervyn Morris in his paper already referred to, has been the only person who has taken the trouble to discuss Miss Bennett’s work in detail and with commendable critical awareness." Analyzing what this means, Nettleford goes on to say more on this: "The absence of more serious literary analysis is a commentary on the prevailing ignorance that envelops the subject of the Jamaican dialect." The absence Nettleford speaks of pertains to how, mentioned before, there are people who do not take Bennett seriously as a poet.

In his paper "Louise Bennett in Print", Morris disagrees with Nettleford saying that Jamaica Labrish is not the best example of Bennett’s writing because, as he says, “although some aspects of her verse is clarified and/or enhanced in performance, there are others more fully appreciated by a reader savouring text." He does not believe that there is an easy way to criticize Labrish through a literary lens: "Not enough is known about the language which she uses for us to be sure about what are 'the best of the others' though the rigid application of criteria born of a tradition of English literary criticism could, I daresay, disqualify a great many of the pieces."

== Poems ==
“Govanah” is a poem that discusses the year 1943 when the current governor of Jamaica, Sir Arthur Richards, was to be transferred. The blurb at the beginning of this poem in Labrish says that Richards was a "strong man who believed in the maintenance of law and order". Despite this, Richards "reputedly made many friends among Jamaicans" and was even partially responsible for the 1944 Constitution "introducing adult suffrage". The last part of the poem reflects the people of Jamaica’s thoughts on this and how in the future the constitution might need a "strong man like Richards to see it through". Bennett writes: "Ef is soh Jamaica changible, Doah me is a Jamaican, Me dah-trimble, for me narvas bout dis new Cons'itution". The poem reflects the people being nervous for how the new constitution will be written and amended.

The poem following "Govanah" is one called "New Govanah", which discusses the time when Sir John Huggins replaced Sir Richards. The historical information at the beginning of this poem says, "If Richards was the pill, then Sir John Huggins was the sweet coating to cut the bitter taste." Morris considers "New Govanah", the poem following "Govanah" to be one of the poems within Labrish, to be a "fine example of Miss Bennett’s ironic skills". The poem pins the governor up against the lack of agricultural products and money in Jamaica. It references things like white rice and a "t’ree month war bonus" which is pay given to those whose husbands were currently deployed during a time of war, according to Morris, though he does not mention which war. White rice, at the time, was less available than brown rice. Since the poem is essentially taking the value of the governor and pinning it against the value of "commodities" in Jamaica, Morris points out that the governor is the white rice (literally because he is white) and "less available than the brown people".

The poem "Duty Bound" is about governor Sir Hugh Foot and his wife leaving Jamaica. The historical blurb at the beginning of this poem describes it as a "farewell tribute to him". The people of Jamaica are sad that the Foots are leaving. Bennett writes: "De Govanah was popula! An dat is not noh lie, de whole Jamaica sad fe tell de Goavanah goodbye." The line "Mix up wid we art an Drama; Teck een every line an word, you want hear govanah an him wife, hall(a) Chi Chi Bird" refers to an old Jamaican folk song called "Chi Chi Bud". Bud is the dialect for 'bird'. They do not sing the song in the correct dialect the folksong was written in. This poem is teasing the governor and his wife, but in a loving way, because of how much this governor was loved.
