= Paul Bogle =

Jamaican Baptist deacon, national hero, and activist (1822–1865)

The Right Excellent Paul Bogle ONH
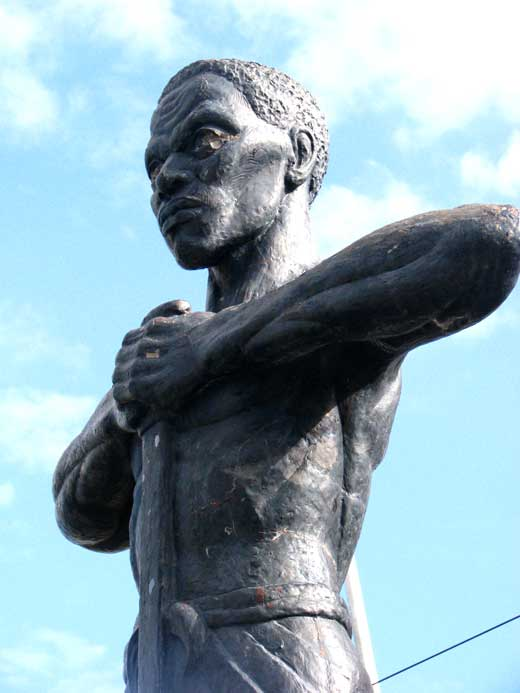
- "Artistic Impression of Paul Bogle" in Morant Bay, Jamaica
- Born: 1822; Saint Thomas, Jamaica
- Died: 24 October 1865 (aged 42–43); Morant Bay, Saint Thomas, Jamaica
- Cause of death: Execution by hanging
- Occupations: Baptist deacon, activist
- Known for: Leader of the protesters in the Morant Bay rebellion
- Website: https://paulboglefoundation.org/

Paul Bogle (1822 – 24 October 1865) was a Jamaican Baptist deacon and activist. He is a National Hero of Jamaica. He was a leader of the 1865 Morant Bay protesters, who marched for justice and fair treatment for all the people in Jamaica. After leading the Morant Bay rebellion, Bogle was captured, tried and convicted by the colonial government (who had declared martial law), and hanged on 24 October 1865 in the Morant Bay court house.

Bogle had become a friend of a wealthy landowner and fellow Baptist George William Gordon, a bi-racial man who served in the Assembly as one of two representatives from St. Thomas-in-the-East parish. Gordon was instrumental in Bogle being appointed deacon of Stony Gut Baptist Church in 1864. Conditions were hard for black peasants, due to social discrimination, flooding and crop failure, and epidemics. The required payment of poll taxes prevented most of them from voting. In August 1865, Gordon criticised the governor of Jamaica, Edward John Eyre, for sanctioning "everything done by the higher class to the oppression of the negroes".

Bogle concentrated on improving the conditions of the poor. As awareness of social injustices and people's grievances grew, Bogle led a group of small farmers 45 miles to the capital, Spanish Town, hoping to meet with Governor Eyre to discuss their issues, but they were denied an audience. The people of Stony Gut lost confidence and trust in the Government, and Bogle's supporters grew in number in the parish.

== Morant Bay rebellion ==
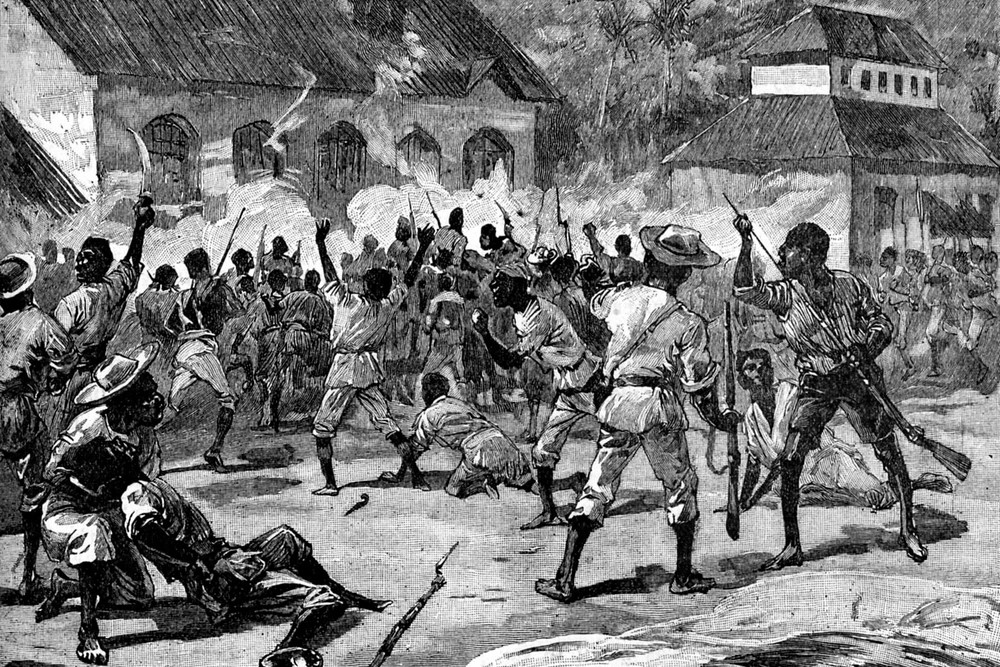
The Morant Bay rebellion, 1865

On 7 October 1865, Bogle and some supporters attended a trial of two men from Stony Gut. One was convicted and sentenced to prison on charges of trespassing on a long abandoned plantation. A member of Bogle's group protested in court over the case, but was immediately arrested, angering the crowd further. He was rescued moments later when Bogle and his men took to the market square and retaliated. The police were severely beaten and forced to retreat.

On Monday, 9 October 1865, warrants were issued against Bogle and a number of others for riot and assault. The police arrived in Stony Gut to arrest Bogle but met with stiff resistance from the residents. They fought the police, forcing them to retreat to Morant Bay.

A few days later on 11 October 1865, there was a vestry meeting in the Court House. That day Bogle led hundreds of followers, armed with sticks and machetes, on a protest march to the court house. The authorities had mustered a volunteer militia, who fired into the protesters after stones were thrown, killing seven men. The protesters set fire to the Court House and nearby buildings. When officials tried to leave, several were killed by the angry mob outside; a total of 25 on both sides died that day.

Black peasants rose and took control of the parish for two days. The governor quickly retaliated, declaring martial law and ordering troops to capture the rebels and suppress the rebellion. The troops destroyed Stony Gut and Bogle's chapel, killing more than 400 persons outright across the parish, including women and children. They arrested more than 300 persons, including Bogle. Jamaican Maroons from Moore Town eventually captured Bogle and delivered him to the colonial government. He was tried under martial law and quickly executed, as were many others. Others, including women, and children were brought back to Morant Bay to be tried under martial law. Gordon was convicted of conspiracy and hanged on 23 October, and Bogle was hanged the following day.

Back in Britain there was public outcry, and increased opposition from liberals against Eyre's handling of the situation, with accusations against him of murder. Supporters praised the governor for acting quickly in the crisis to suppress a potentially larger rebellion.

== Aftermath ==
By the end of 1865 the "Governor Eyre Case" had become the subject of widespread national debate. In January 1866, a Royal Commission was sent to investigate the events. Governor Eyre was suspended and recalled to England and eventually dismissed. The national government changed that of Jamaica. The House of Assembly resigned its charter, and Jamaica was made a Crown Colony, governed directly by Britain.

The "Eyre Controversy" turned into a long and increasingly public issue, dividing well-known figures of the day. It may have contributed to the fall of the government. In 1866 John Stuart Mill set up and chaired the Jamaica Committee to examine the atrocities committed in Jamaica in the course of ending the rebellion. Thomas Carlyle set up a rival committee to defend Eyre. His supporters included John Ruskin, Charles Kingsley, Charles Dickens and Alfred, Lord Tennyson.

The Morant Bay rebellion turned out to be one of the defining points in Jamaica's struggle for both political and economical enhancement. Bogle's demonstration ultimately achieved its objectives and paved the way for new attitudes.

== Legacy ==
In 1969 Paul Bogle was named a National Hero along with George William Gordon, Marcus Garvey, Sir Alexander Bustamante and Norman Washington Manley. In the 1970s, two other National Heroes were added in the form of Samuel Sharpe and Queen Nanny of the Maroons.

Bogle is depicted on the heads side of the Jamaican 10-cent coin. His face was also depicted on the Jamaican two-dollar bill, from 1969 until 1989, when the two-dollar bill was phased out. Since 2023, he has been featured on the fifty dollar bill alongside George William Gordon. The identity of the sitter in the photograph used for these depictions is disputed.

The Paul Bogle High School in the parish of his birth is named after him.

He is referred to together with Toussaint L'Ouverture, leader of the Haitian Revolution, in the name of the London-based publishing company Bogle-L'Ouverture.

=== In popular culture ===
As a national hero, Paul Bogle is referenced in many works of Jamaican culture. Most notably, dancehall performer Gerald Levy's stage name was "Bogle" (also "Mr Bogle" and "Father Bogle").

Third World produced a song about Bogle's execution, "1865 (96 Degrees In The Shade)", released in 1977 on the album of the same name. Other reggae artists who have named and written songs in tribute to Paul Bogle include Lee Scratch Perry and a co-production between The Aggrovators and the Revolutionaries.

Bogle is mentioned in songs by Burning Spear, The Mighty Diamonds, Brigadier Jerry, The Cimarons, Steel Pulse, Prince Far I, Lauryn Hill, Third World and General Trees.

In "So Much Things to Say", by Bob Marley & The Wailers (and subsequently covered by Lauryn Hill), Marley mentions Bogle in the same breath as Jesus Christ and Marcus Garvey, concluding: "I'll never forget no way they turned their backs on Paul Bogle, so don't you forget no youth who you are and where you stand in the struggle."

Paul Bogle is mentioned in the songs "See them a come" and "Innocent blood" by the reggae band Culture. Tarrus Riley also mentions Paul Bogle in the song "Shaka Zulu Pickney", alluding to his ancestry as a freedom fighter. St Thomas-born reggae artist Dwight "Bushman" Duncan hosts an annual Black History Month event called Football N Style in honor of Paul Bogle. He has also dedicated a series of his YouTube blog "Where I'm From" to Paul Bogle and the Morant Bay uprising.

Paul Bogle and the events outlined above are the theme of "Ballard of 65" by General Trees.

The British rapper Akala references Bogle on the track "Maangamizi" from his album The Thieves Banquet, saying: "Probably don't know the Haitian Revolution caused the French to sell half of America, nor know the role that Africans played in the Civil War for that same America. If you ain't heard of Nanny of the Maroons or Bogle, you probably believe what they told you."

Jamaican reggae and dancehall musician Junior Reid mentions Paul Bogle in the song "Same Boat", which recalls the era of slavery, by saying "Paul Bogle haffi run like Usain Bolt".

Both George William Gordon and Paul Bogle are mentioned in Horace Andy's "Our Jamaican National Heroes", while Ruddy Thomas' "Grandfather Bogle" is a Bogle tribute.

Bogle and the Morant Bay rebellion are pivotal plot points in Zadie Smith's 2023 novel The Fraud.

Prince Far I - Jamaican Heroes released on Trojan Records 1980
