= Order of the Nation =

Second highest honour in Jamaica

- Type: Single grade Order
- Awarded for: those appointed to the office of Governor General or Prime Minister of Jamaica
- Presented by: Jamaica
- Eligibility: Jamaican citizens
- Post-nominals: ON
- Motto: "One Nation Under God"
- Established: 1968
- First award: 1973
- Ribbon of the order

Precedence
- Next (higher): Order of the National Hero
- Equivalent: Order of Excellence
- Next (lower): Order of Merit

The Order of the Nation is a Jamaican honour. It is a part of the Jamaican honours system and was instituted in 1973 as the second-highest honour in the country, with the Order of National Hero being the highest honour.

The Order of the Nation is only conferred on the Governor-General of Jamaica and upon any person who has been appointed as Prime Minister of Jamaica, unless they are already recipients of the Order of National Hero.

Members of the order and their spouses are styled "The Most Honourable", and members wear the insignia of the order as a decoration while appending the post-nominal letters ON to their name. The motto of the order is "One Nation Under God".

In 2002, all deceased former Prime Ministers of Jamaica were posthumously awarded the Order of the Nation.
