= Louise Bennett-Coverley =

Jamaican writer, folklorist and educator (1919–2006)

The Honourable Louise Bennett-Coverley OM OJ MBE
- Bennett performing at the Anacostia Neighbourhood Museum's Jamaica Festival in Washington, D.C., 1969
- Born: Louise Simone Bennett; 7 September 1919; Kingston, Colony of Jamaica, British Empire
- Died: 26 July 2006 (aged 86); Toronto, Ontario, Canada
- Resting place: National Heroes Park (Kingston, Jamaica)
- Education: Royal Academy of Dramatic Art
- Occupations: Poet; folklorist; writer; educator
- Spouse: Eric Winston Coverley (m. 1954; died 2002)
- Children: 1
- Writing career
- Pen name: Miss Lou
- Language: Jamaican Patois; English
- Years active: 1945–1999
- Musical career
- Genre: Folklore
- Labels: Folkways; Island; Federal
- Website: missloujamaica.com

Louise Simone Bennett-Coverley OM OJ MBE (7 September 1919 – 26 July 2006), known by her pen name Miss Lou, was a Jamaican poet, folklorist, actress, writer and educator. Writing and performing her poems in Jamaican Patois or Creole, Bennett worked to preserve the practice of presenting poetry, folk songs and stories in patois ("nation language"), establishing the validity of local languages for literary expression.

== Early life ==
Bennett was born on 7 September 1919 on North Street in Kingston, Jamaica. She was the only child of Augustus Cornelius Bennett, the owner of a bakery in Spanish Town, and Kerene Robinson, a dressmaker. After the death of her father in 1926, Bennett was raised primarily by her mother. Bennett attended elementary school at Ebenezer and Calabar, continuing to St. Simon's College and Excelsior College, in Kingston. In 1943, she enrolled at Friends College in Highgate, St Mary, where she studied Jamaican folklore. That same year, her poetry was first published in the Sunday Gleaner. In 1945, Bennett was the first black student to study at London's Royal Academy of Dramatic Art (RADA), after being awarded a scholarship from the British Council.

== Career ==
On graduating from RADA, Bennett worked with repertory companies in Coventry, Huddersfield and Amersham, as well as in intimate revues across England. During her time in the country, she hosted two radio programmes for the BBC: Caribbean Carnival (1945–1946) and West Indian Night (1950).

Bennett worked for the Jamaica Social Welfare Commission from 1955 to 1959, and taught folklore and drama at the University of the West Indies. From 1965 to 1982, she produced Miss Lou's Views, a series of radio monologues, and in 1970 started hosting the children's television programme Ring Ding. Airing until 1982, the show was based on Bennett's belief "that 'de pickney-dem learn de sinting dat belong to dem' (that the children learn about their heritage)". As part of the programme, children from across the country were invited to share their artistic talents on-air. In addition to her television appearances, Bennett appeared in various motion pictures, which included Calypso (1958), Who Finds a Friend Finds a Treasure (1981) and Club Paradise (1986).

Bennett wrote several books and poetry in Jamaican Patois, helping to have it recognized as a "nation language" in its own right. Her work influenced many other writers – among them Mutabaruka, Linton Kwesi Johnson and Yasus Afari – to use it in a similar manner. She also released numerous recordings of traditional Jamaican folk music and recordings from her radio and television shows, including Jamaican Folk Songs, Children's Jamaican Songs and Games, Miss Lou’s Views (1967), Listen to Louise (1968), Carifesta Ring Ding (1976), and The Honorable Miss Lou. She is credited with giving Harry Belafonte the foundation for his 1956 hit "Day-O (The Banana Boat Song)" by telling him about the Jamaican folk song "Hill and Gully Rider" (the name also given as "Day Dah Light").

== Personal life ==
Bennett was married to Eric Winston Coverley, an early performer and promoter of Jamaican theatre, from 30 May 1954 until his death in August 2002. Together, Bennett and Coverley had a son, Fabian.

== Death and funeral ==
Bennett lived in Scarborough, Ontario. She died on 27 July 2006 at the Scarborough Grace Hospital after collapsing at her home. A memorial service was held in Toronto on 3 August 2006, after which her body was flown to Jamaica to lie in state at the National Arena on 7 and 8 August. A funeral was held in Kingston at the Coke Methodist Church at East Parade on 9 August 2006 followed by her interment in the cultural icons section of the country's National Heroes Park. Bennett's husband predeceased her.

== Cultural significance and legacy ==
Dr. Basil Bryan, Consul General of Jamaica, praised Bennett as an inspiration to Jamaicans as she "proudly presented the Jamaican language and culture to a wider world and today we are the beneficiaries of that audacity." She was acclaimed by many for her success in establishing the validity of local languages for literary expression. An important aspect of her writing was its setting in public spaces such as trams, schools and churches allowing readers to see themselves, pre- and post-independence, reflected in her work. Her writing has also been credited with providing a unique perspective on the everyday social experiences of working-class women in a postcolonial landscape.

Bennett's 103rd birthday was marked with a Google Doodle on 7 September 2022.

=== Archives ===
In 2011, photographs, audiovisual recordings, correspondence, awards and other material regarding Bennett were donated to the McMaster University Library by her family with the intention of having selections from the fonds, which date from 1941 to 2008, digitized and made available online as part of a digital archive A selection of Bennett's personal papers are also available at the National Library of Jamaica. Launched in October 2016, the Miss Lou Archives contains previously unpublished archival material, including photos, audio recording, diaries and correspondence. The holdings of the Miss Lou Archives were donated to the Library by Bennett as she prepared to take up residence in Canada.

== Awards and honours ==
Bennett received numerous honours and awards for her work in Jamaican literature and theatre. In recognition of her achievements, Harbourfront Centre, a non-profit cultural organisation in Toronto, Ontario, Canada, has a venue named Miss Lou's Room. The University of Toronto is home to the Louise Bennett Exchange Fellowship in Caribbean Literary Studies for students from the University of West Indies. Her other awards and honours include:

- Member of the Most Excellent Order of the British Empire (1960)
- Norman Manley Award for Excellence (1972)
- Order of Jamaica (1974)
- Musgrave Medal (1978)
- Honorary Doctor of Letters – York University (1998)
- Jamaican Order of Merit (2001)

== Select publications ==
=== Books ===
- Anancy Stories And Poems In Dialect. Kingston, Jamaica: The Gleaner Co. Ltd (1944).
- Laugh with Louise: A pot-pourri of Jamaican folklore. Kingston: City Printery. 1961. OCLC 76815511.
- Jamaica Labrish. Jamaica: Sangster's Book Stores. 1966. OCLC 1968770.
- Selected Poems. Jamaica: Sangster's Book Stores. 1982.
- Auntie Roachy Seh. Jamaica: Sangster's Book Stores. 1993.

=== Recordings ===
- Jamaican Folk Songs. New York: Folkways. 1954. OCLC 255714807.
- Yes m'dear: Miss Lou live!. Sonic Sounds. 1982. OCLC 23971117.

== Filmography ==
Year	Title	Role
1958	Calypso	Martha
1965	A High Wind in Jamaica	Mamie
1981	Who Finds a Friend Finds a Treasure	Mama
1986	Club Paradise	Portia
2001	Resistance	

== See also ==
- Caribbean literature
