= Brian Meeks =

Caribbean poet and academic (born 1953)

Brian Meeks (born 1953) is a Caribbean poet and academic, who was born in Canada and grew up in Jamaica.

== Biography ==
Brian Meeks was born in Montreal, Quebec, of West Indian parents, and grew up in Jamaica. His poetry has been published in several anthologies, and his collection The Coup Clock Clicks was published in 2018. His novel, Paint the Town Red (published by Peepal Tree Press in 2003), is an exploration of the turbulent years of the 1970s in Jamaica (the first Michael Manley administration) through the eyes of a young middle-class man.

Meeks is a Professor of Africana Studies and former chair (2015–2021) of the department at Brown University. He taught political science at the University of the West Indies, Mona, Jamaica, and was director of the Sir Arthur Lewis Institute of Social and Economic Studies until 2015.

He has written or edited eleven books on Caribbean revolutions, radical Caribbean politics, Caribbean futures and Caribbean political thought, including Critical Interventions in Caribbean Politics and Theory, Caribbean Revolutions and Revolutionary Theory: an Assessment of Cuba, Nicaragua and Grenada, Narratives of Resistance: Jamaica, Trinidad, the Caribbean, and Envisioning Caribbean Futures: Jamaican Perspectives.
