= The Jamaican Folk Singers =

- Origin: Kingston, Jamaica
- Genres: Jamaican folk music
- Years active: 1967–present

The Jamaican Folk Singers are a Jamaican ensemble dedicated to traditional Jamaican songs.

== History ==
The group was founded by Dr. Olive Lewin in March 1967, originally a group of eight friends with an interest in Jamaican folk songs.

The group were invited to play at the funeral of Count Ossie in 1976.

By 2012 the group had expanded to 28 members. The group's current musical director is Christine MacDonald-Nevers, whose mother, the soprano Marilyn Brice-MacDonald, is one of the longest serving members.

The group has released several albums including Pepperpot in 2006, and performs an annual season of concerts.

== Discography ==
- The Jamaican Folk Singers In A Programme Of Jamaican Folk Songs Vol. 2/71, Ashanti/Hummingbird
- The Jamaican Folk Singers Vol 3, Encore
- Authentic Jamaican Folksongs, Hummingbird
- Pepperpot (2006)
