= M. G. Smith =

Jamaican social anthropologist and poet (1921–1993)

The Honourable M. G. Smith OM
- Born: 18 August 1921; Kingston, Colony of Jamaica, British Empire
- Died: 5 January 1993 (aged 71)
- Education: McGill University; University College, London (PhD)
- Occupations: Social anthropologist; poet
- Employers: University College, London; Yale University; University of California, Los Angeles; University of the West Indies
- Known for: Social anthropologist and poet
- Spouse: Mary F. Morrison
- Children: 3
- Awards: Wellcome Medal for Anthropological Research; Curle Bequest Essay Prize; Amaury Book Prize (Royal Anthropological Institute); Order of Merit (Jamaica 1972)

Michael Garfield Smith OM (18 August 1921 – 5 January 1993) was a Jamaican social anthropologist and poet of international repute.

== Biography ==
Born in Kingston, Jamaica, M.G. Smith was from an early age academically minded and performed well in school. When he was a schoolboy at Jamaica College, his schoolmates claimed him as their "intellectual hero." In 1939 at age seventeen, Smith achieved the highest marks of all Higher Schools Certificate candidates in the entire British Empire. More than a student scholar, he later emerged as a published poet of promise. His scholarly feats earned him the Jamaica Scholarship, which did not take him to Bombay as he had wished, but to Canada, where he went to study English literature at McGill University. Joining the Canadian army during the war, he served briefly on the frontline in Europe, France, Holland and Germany. Demobilized in London in 1945, he turned from literature to law, which he studied for a year before his switch to anthropology. As his wife Mary reported, Smith found the law "an a

ss" and not, as he had hoped, about justice. He took to anthropology quickly and anthropology to him. Soon he became a prize student in Daryll Forde's department at University College London, completed his undergraduate work in short order, and after field research in Northern Nigeria, was awarded the PhD in 1951. He subsequently carried out extensive field research in Northern Nigeria, Jamaica, Grenada, and Carriacou. Smith served as the senior research fellow, Institute of Social and Economic Research University of the West Indies (Jamaica); professor of anthropology at the University of California, Los Angeles; senior research fellow, Research Institute for the Study of Man, New York City; Franklin M. Crosby Professor Emeritus, Human Environment at Yale University; and as professor and head of the Department of Anthropology, University College, London.

== Personal life ==
Smith was married to Mary Felice (née Morrison), author of Baba of Karo (1954), with whom he shared a lifelong collaboration. They had three sons.

== Anthropology ==
Smith's professional career in anthropology, straddling three continents and the Caribbean, was distinguished. His first appointment, which made possible a return home after eleven years, was to the Institute of Social and Economic Research in Jamaica. When the ISER was merged into what is now the University of the West Indies, Smith was also appointed a senior lecturer in sociology. Over eight years, he embarked on an ambitious program of Caribbean research, carried out a year's field work in Nigeria, published prolifically on both the West Indies and Africa, and established his reputation as an anthropologist. In 1961, he left Jamaica to become professor of anthropology at the University of California at Los Angeles. Lasting eight years, this first stay in the United States provided the impetus for four books and some thirty articles. He, Mary and their three boys returned to Great Britain in 1969. It was a move made for personal rather than academic reasons, without any prior offers of employment. Smith was offered the chair of his old department at University College London. When in 1972 while at UCL, his old schoolmate and Prime Minister of Jamaica, Michael Manley, requested his services as special adviser, he accepted this added appointment as well. This policy-related assignment lasted until 1977 and was carried out during one of the darkest periods of modern Jamaican history. Smith returned to the United States in 1978 as the Franklin M. Crosby Professor of the Human Environment at Yale University, a post he held until his retirement in 1986.

Smith was both theorist and field worker. His personal field research in Africa and the West Indies stretched over half a century. In 1949–50, 1958–59, 1972, and 1977–78, he studied the Hausa, Kagoro, and Kadara in Northern Nigeria. In 1952–53, he worked in Grenada and its dependency Carriacou on social stratification, religion, kinship, and community. In 1955, 1960, 1964, and 1974–75 he carried out a variety of field projects, some with an applied bent, in Jamaica. And, finally in 1990, when he was nearly seventy years old, he returned to Grenada to study the course of education since independence. His books on Africa include: The Economy of Hausa Communities of Zaria; Government in Zazzau, 1800–1950; Pluralism in Africa (with Leo Kuper); The Affairs of Daura; and Government in Kano, 1350–1959. On West Indian themes, they include: A Framework for Caribbean Studies; A Report on Labour Supply in Rural Jamaica; A Sociological Manual for Extension Workers in the Caribbean (with G.J. Kruijer); The Ras Tafari Movement in Kingston, Jamaica (with R. Augier and R.M. Nettleford); West Indian Family Structure; Kinship and Community in Carriacou; Dark Puritan; The Plural Society in the British West Indies; Stratification in Grenada; Culture, Race and Class in the Commonwealth Caribbean; Poverty in Jamaica and Pluralism, Politics and Ideology in the Creole Caribbean. Corporations and Society, a collection of his articles, transcends regional emphases and deals directly with theoretical and methodological issues.

The Study of Social Structure is one of two studies that he virtually had completed at the time of his death in 1993. It unfolds elements of Smith's epistemology while reopening the subject of social structure to systematic inquiry. Throughout his career, he was steadfast in the belief that the study of social structure, despite a period of scholarly disinterest, was central to the anthropological enterprise, and he was even more resolute that the subject itself be critically reexamined. In both regards, he called for the development of new conceptual frameworks "free of unverifiable postulates" to facilitate the study of social structural phenomena. He wrote that traditional Western ideas of societies as normatively and functionally integrated systems of action had to be supplemented, "perhaps" even replaced, by concepts that suspend such assumptions so as to permit the investigation of social units and relations "directly as concrete empirical structures." His plural society and corporation work provide examples of viable alternatives to what he called "the familiar system model." The Study of Social Structure deals with those perspectives and approaches that objectify and thereby unravel social structures and their component parts. The second work, Education and Society in the Creole Caribbean (with Lambros Comitas and sections by Philip Burnham, Jack Harewood, and Josep Llobera) was designed by Smith as a multi-year project on the post-independence effects of education on three Anglophone Caribbean societies, Grenada, Barbados and Trinidad & Tobago to contribute to a fuller understanding of education through the use of anthropological methods and techniques; to determine whether or not, as well as how the educational systems of the three island nations acted to maintain or to change structural and cultural frameworks derived from a colonial past; and, to determine whether or not and how, if at all, the educational systems of these three small countries served to promote development or to increase the potential for development.

== Poetry ==
Smith's poetry was published in regional journals and literary magazines in the 1950s and 1960s and has been widely anthologized. It has been noted: "He often decorates his work with classical references and titles, although his subjects are usually West Indian." His patriotic poem "I Saw My Land in the Morning" has also been set to music. Nobel Laureate Derek Walcott once ranked Smith as "one of the two important writers of recent Jamaican poetry." His collected poems have been published in the book In the Kingdom of Light (2003).

== Bibliography ==
A prolific writer, Smith authored or co-authored numerous books and articles on theory, on Northern Nigeria, and on the West Indies. The Smith corpus of social science publications, the M. G. Smith Archive, is online in www.cifas.us, 26 books, 41 articles, 41 chapters, 21 reviews and 10 unpublished manuscripts of various lengths.

== Awards ==
Smith was the recipient of numerous awards among which were the Wellcome Medal for Anthropological Research, the Curle Bequest Essay Prize, the Amaury Book Prize from the Royal Anthropological Institute, and honorary degrees from McGill University and the University of the West Indies. In 1972 Jamaica bestowed upon its native son its highest honor, the Order of Merit (OM) and the same year the Institute of Jamaica awarded him their Musgrave Gold Medal. He was also awarded an honorary Doctor of Laws from McGill University, and an honorary Doctor of Literature from the University of the West Indies.
