= Morant Bay rebellion =

1865 rebellion in Morant Bay, Jamaica

Coordinates: 17.8819°N 76.4074°W

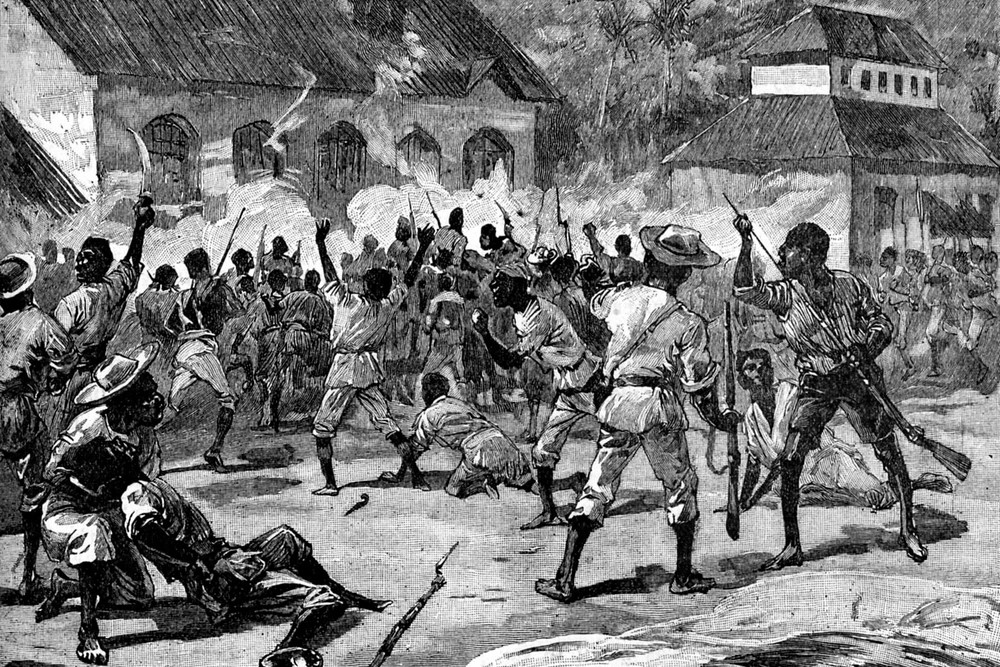
- The attack on the court house St Thomas in the East Jamaica, 1865
- Location: Morant Bay, Jamaica
- Date: 11 October 1865; 161 years ago

The Morant Bay Rebellion (11 October 1865) began with a protest march to the courthouse in Morant Bay, Jamaica, by hundreds of people led by preacher Paul Bogle. Some were armed with sticks and stones. After seven men were shot and killed by the volunteer militia, the protesters attacked and burned the courthouse and nearby buildings. Twenty-five people died. Over the next two days, poor freedmen rose in rebellion across most of St. Thomas-in-the-East parish.

The freedmen were protesting against widespread poverty and perceived injustices. Most were prevented from voting by high poll taxes, and their living standards had worsened following crop damage by floods, cholera and smallpox epidemics, and a long drought. A few days before the march, when police tried to arrest a man for disrupting a trial, spectators sought to prevent them. Officials then issued a warrant for the arrest of preacher Bogle, who had called for reforms, and he was charged with inciting to riot.

Governor Edward John Eyre declared martial law in the area, ordering in troops to hunt down the rebels. They killed more than 400 black people and arrested more than 300, including Bogle. Many were innocent but were quickly tried and executed under martial law; other men and women were punished by whipping and long sentences. This was the most severe suppression of unrest in the history of the British West Indies. The governor had George William Gordon, a mixed-race representative of the parish in the House of Assembly, arrested in Kingston and brought back to Morant Bay, where he tried the politician under martial law. Gordon was quickly convicted and executed.

The violent suppression and numerous executions generated debate in England, with some protesting about the unconstitutional actions of the governor, and others praising him for his response to a crisis. The rebellion and its suppression remain controversial, and it is frequently discussed by specialists in black and colonial studies.

== Background ==
Slavery in Jamaica was abolished on 1 August 1834 with the passage of the Slavery Abolition Act. The act also stipulated that all formerly enslaved persons in Jamaica over the age of six would work as apprentices for a period of four to six years for their former enslavers, though British abolitionists protested against the apprenticeship system and it was fully abolished by 1 August 1838.

This date marked the start of Jamaicans formerly in the apprenticeship system being allowed to choose their employer and profession; though they also gained the right to vote, most Jamaicans could not afford to pay the poll tax required to participate in Jamaica's political system. The poll tax was introduced by the colonial government to disfranchise the majority of emancipated Jamaicans, being fearful of causing an anti-colonial uprising (such as the Haitian Revolution) if they granted too much political power.

== Tensions in the 1860s ==
During the election of 1864, fewer than 2,000 black Jamaican men were eligible to vote (no women could vote at the time) out of a total population of more than 436,000, in which blacks outnumbered whites by a ratio of 32:1. Prior to the rebellion, conditions in Jamaica had been worsening for poor blacks. In 1864 there were several floods that ruined many crops, while 1865 marked the end of a decade in which the island had been overwhelmed by plagues of cholera and smallpox. A two-year drought preceding 1865 made economic conditions worse for much of the population of survivors of slavery and their descendants. Several bankruptcies were declared in the sugar industry, causing a loss of jobs and widening the economic void.

Tensions between white planters and black Jamaicans increased, and rumours began circulating among the freedmen that white planters intended to restore slavery. Gordon criticized Eyre's draconian punishments such as flogging and the treadmill for crimes such as stealing food. He warned that "If we are to be governed by such a Governor much longer, the people will have to fly to arms and become self-governing."

In 1865, Dr. Edward Underhill, Secretary of the Baptist Missionary Society of Great Britain, wrote a letter to the Colonial Office in London in order to describe Jamaica's poor state of affairs for the mass of people. This letter was later shown to Jamaica's Governor John Eyre, who immediately tried to deny the truth of its statements. Jamaica's poor black people learned of the letter and began organizing in "Underhill Meetings". Peasants in Saint Ann parish sent a petition to Queen Victoria asking for Crown lands to cultivate, saying they could not find land for themselves. The petition was sent to Eyre first, and he enclosed a letter with his own comments.

The Queen's reply was made known, and many of the poor believed that Eyre had influenced her opinion: she encouraged the poor to work harder, rather than offering any help. Gordon, who was one of two representatives from the parish of St. Thomas-in-the-East, began encouraging the people in his parish to find ways to make their grievances known.

One of his followers was a black Baptist deacon named Paul Bogle. In August 1865 Bogle led a deputation of peasants from St. Thomas-in-the-East an 87 kilometer (55 mile) march to the capital, Spanish Town, hoping to meet with the governor, John Eyre to discuss issues. But the governor refused to receive them.

== Rebellion and response ==
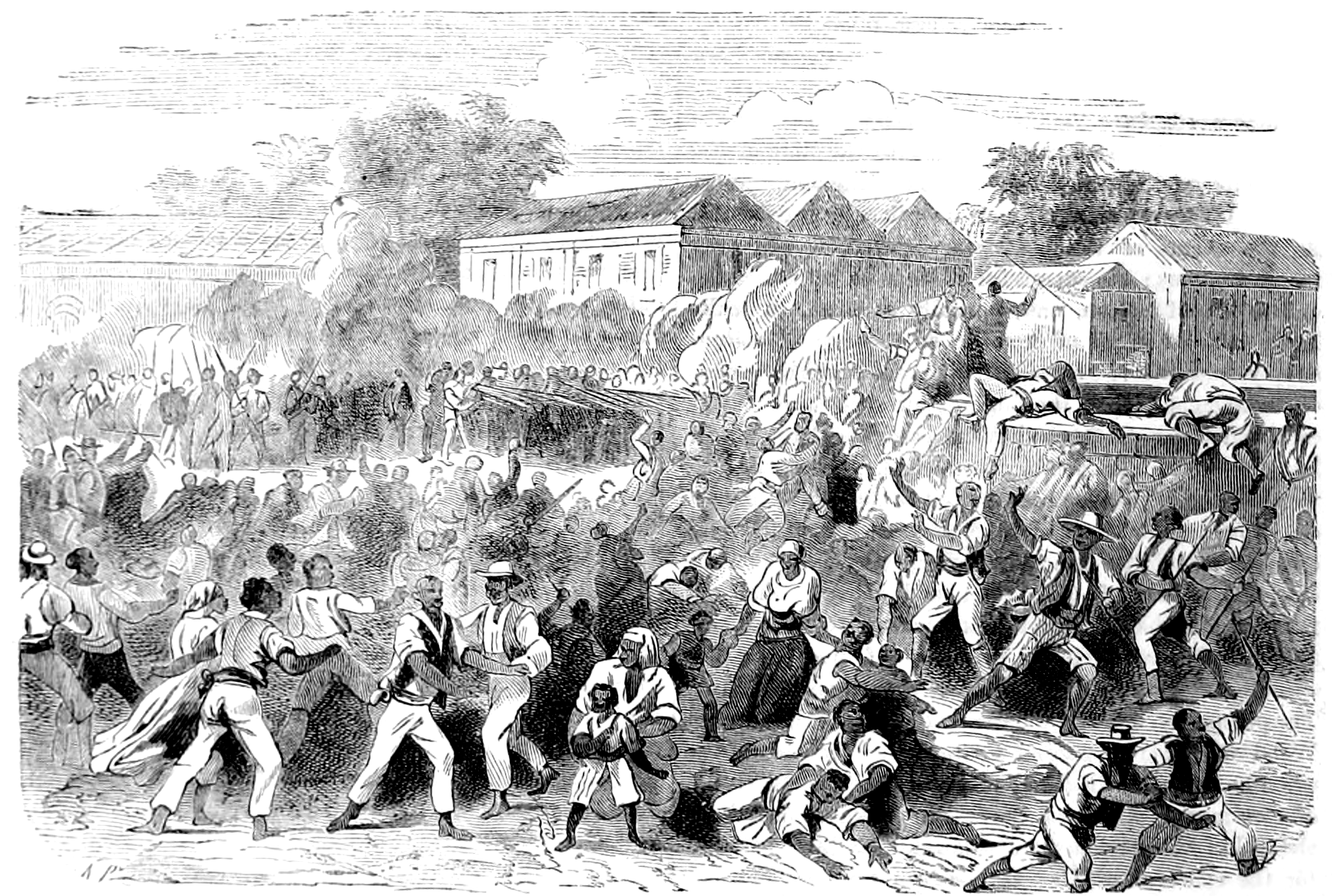
The Jamaica Insurrection: Volunteers firing on the mob

On 7 October 1865, a black man was put on trial in the Morant Bay courthouse, charged with trespassing on a long-abandoned sugar plantation. The poor black Jamaicans of the parish were angered by this additional example of land inequality, and marched on the courthouse under the leadership of Bogle. Although the march was peaceful, the proceedings were disrupted when James Geoghegon, a black spectator, angrily denounced the charges. In the police's attempts to seize him and remove him from the courthouse, a fight broke out between the police and other spectators. While pursuing Geoghegon, two policemen were beaten with sticks and stones thrown from the crowd. The trial continued and Geoghegon was convicted and imprisoned. The following Monday the court issued arrest warrants for several men for rioting, resisting arrest, and assaulting the police. Among those warrants was one issued directing the arrest of preacher Paul Bogle. The police were unable to arrest Bogle because of interference by his followers.

A few days later on 11 October, Bogle, this time with hundreds of Jamaican peasant-labourers, again marched to Morant Bay. The marchers had taken oaths, to "cleave to the black and leave the white", a sign that they were preparing for insurrection, or so Gad Heuman argues, indicating that oath taking in African tradition was a way to bring the group together and prepare for war.

When the group arrived at the courthouse in Morant Bay, they were met by local officials and a small and inexperienced volunteer militia, gathered from personnel from the plantations. The crowd began pelting the militia with rocks and sticks, and the militia opened fire on the protesters. This angered the crowd, who reacted violently, burning the court house and nearby buildings. More than 25 people were killed on both sides, before the militia retreated. For the next two days, the mass of rebellious black peasants took over the parish of St. Thomas-in-the-East.

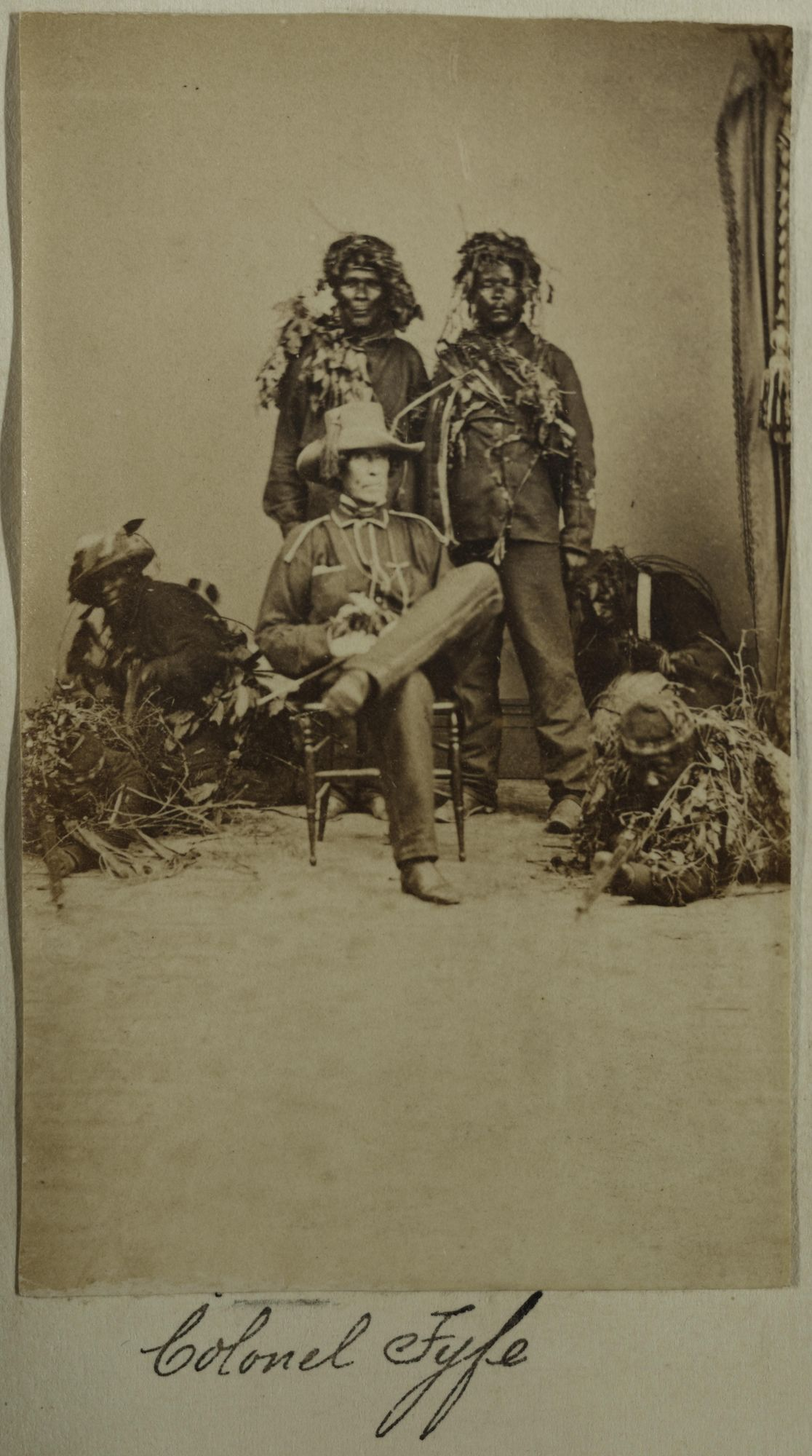
Colonel Fyfe with six Maroons, c. 1865

In response, Governor John Eyre sent government troops, under Brigadier-General Alexander Nelson, to hunt down the poorly armed rebels and bring Bogle back to Morant Bay for trial. The troops met with no organized resistance, but they killed blacks indiscriminately, most of whom had not been involved in either the riot at the courthouse or the later rebellion. Amongst the rebels shot or hanged with only perfunctory trial, or no trial at all, were seven women of colour – Letitia Geoghegan, Mary Ann Francis, Judy Edwards, Ellen Dawkins, Justina Taylor, Sarah Francis and Mary Ward. Heuman has described it as a reign of terror. The Jamaican Maroons of Moore Town, under the command of former Charles Town superintendent Alexander Fyfe, committed a number of atrocities and extrajudicial murders before they captured and arrested Bogle, and delivered him to the colonial authorities.

Believing that the blacks could not have planned such events themselves (as he shared the widespread white assumption of the time that they were not capable of it), Governor John Eyre had representative George William Gordon arrested. The mixed-race Jamaican businessman and politician was wealthy and well-known; he was openly critical of the governor and his policies. Eyre believed that Gordon had been behind the rebellion. Despite having very little to do with it, Gordon was quickly convicted and executed. Though he was arrested in Kingston, where martial law had not been declared, Eyre had him transferred to Morant Bay, where he could be tried under martial law.

The trial and execution of Gordon via martial law, following the excesses of suppressing the rebellion, added to the outrage felt by many in Britain. They felt there were serious constitutional issues by Eyre's bringing Gordon under martial law. They were concerned about whether British dependencies should be ruled under the government of law, or through military license. With a speedy trial, Gordon was convicted quickly and hanged on 23 October, just two days after his trial had begun.

According to one soldier, "we slaughtered all before us ... man or woman or child". In the end, the soldiers killed 439 black Jamaicans directly, and they arrested 354 more (including Paul Bogle) who were later executed, many without proper trials. Bogle was executed "either the same evening he was tried or the next morning". On 25 October, Bogle was hanged alongside 14 others, including his brother Moses.

Other punishments included flogging of more than 600 men and women (including some pregnant women), and long prison sentences. The soldiers burned thousands of homes belonging to black Jamaicans without any justifiable reason, leaving families homeless throughout the parish. This was the most severe suppression of unrest in the history of the British West Indies, exceeding incidents during slavery years.

== Aftermath ==
=== Consequences in Britain ===
When news of the Jamaican government's response to the rebellion broke in Britain, with hundreds killed and hundreds more arrested and being executed, it generated fierce debate. Public figures of different political affiliations lined up to support or oppose Governor Eyre's actions. Part of the controversy related to whether observers believed that blacks had planned the uprising on their own, or whether George William Gordon and possibly whites had led them.

Opponents of Eyre established the Jamaica Committee in December 1865, which called for Eyre to be tried for mass murder. More radical members of the Committee wanted him tried for the murder of British subjects, such as George William Gordon, under the rule of law, stating that Eyre's actions taken under the aegis of martial law were illegal. The Committee leaders included the MPs John Bright, Charles Buxton, and Peter Taylor, as well as the scholars Charles Darwin, Thomas Henry Huxley, and Goldwin Smith. Other supporters included T. H. Green, Henry Fawcett, and A. V. Dicey.

The Eyre Defence Committee was formed in August 1866 to support Eyre during the imminent legal actions. Its leaders included MP Lord John Manners, as well as James Brudenell, 7th Earl of Cardigan, scientist John Tyndall, and the authors Thomas Carlyle and John Ruskin. Other supporters were Alfred Tennyson, Charles Kingsley, and Charles Dickens.

The Jamaica Committee initially sought to have Eyre charged criminally with murder, but the grand jury did not indict him. They then supported a lawsuit against Eyre, Phillips v Eyre; the plaintiff Alexander Phillips was a black gentleman who had been arrested similarly to George William Gordon. The suit was decided in Eyre's favour.

The rebellion was used as a justification for more centralized control of Britain's empire.

=== In Jamaica ===
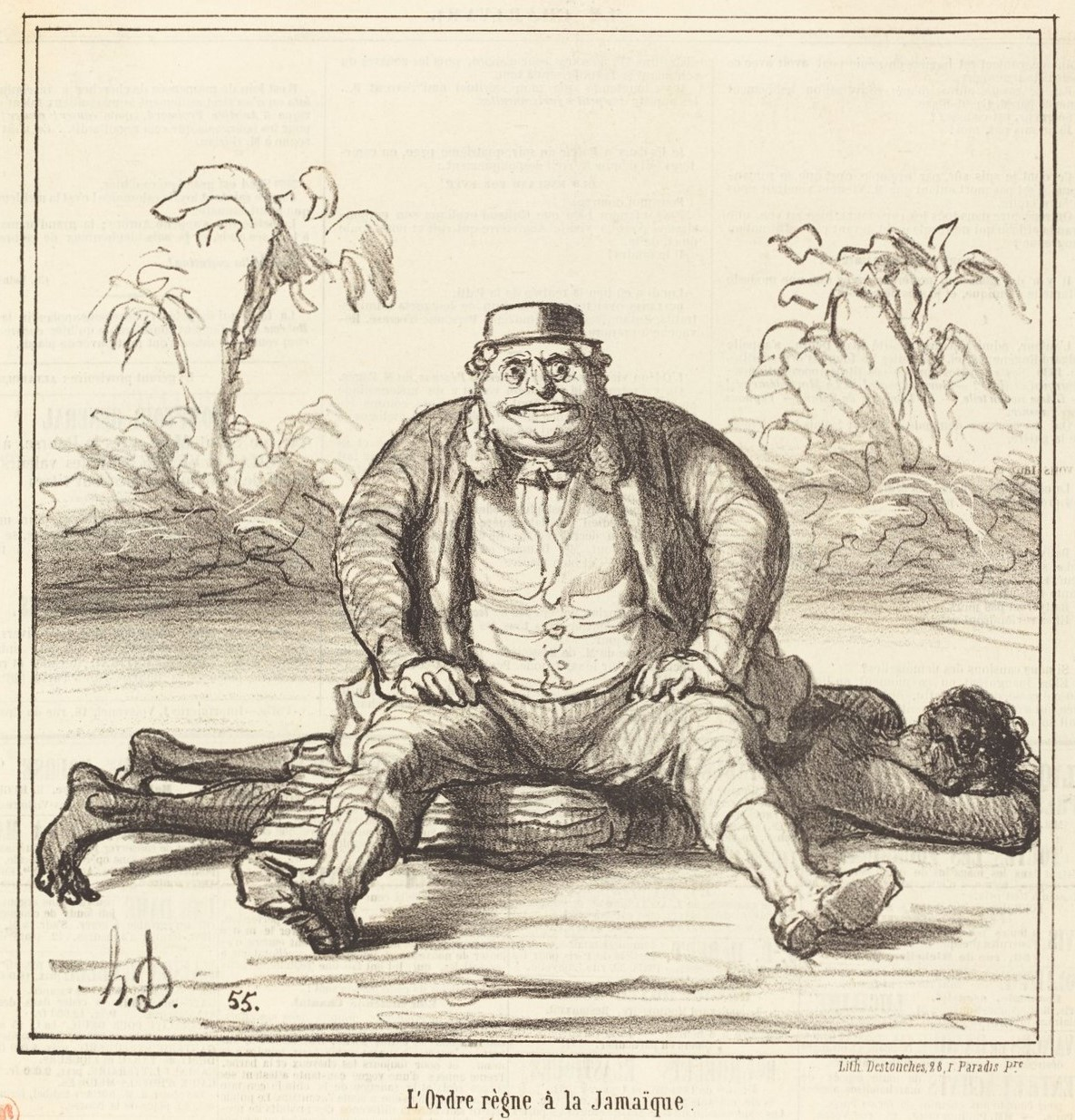
1866 lithography by French cartoonist Honoré Daumier showing British Governor John Peter Grant establishing his authority

Eyre was replaced as governor by John Peter Grant who arrived in August 1866.

Since the 1830s free people of color, like Gordon, Edward Jordon, and Robert Osborn, had been elected to the Jamaican House of Assembly in increasing numbers, and that alarmed the colonial authorities. In the wake of the Morant Bay Rebellion, Eyre, with the support of the Colonial Office, persuaded the Assembly to renounce its charter, thus ending two centuries of elected representation in the Colony of Jamaica.

White planters were appointed by the governor. However, this move deprived the black majority of a voice in the colony's government, and it was condemned by Jordon and Osborn. Jamaica became a Crown Colony, under direct rule from London.

The Morant Bay Rebellion resulted in the immediate implementation of Crown Colony rule in Jamaica, which fundamentally transformed the island's approach to governance and public investment. Under the new system, power shifted from the planter-dominated Assembly to a Governor General appointed by the British Crown, effectively ending the plantation elite's direct control over fiscal policy. This constitutional change produced dramatic and measurable improvements in public welfare spending: public investment's share of total expenditure jumped by 11.5 percentage points immediately after 1866 and continued growing annually, while education spending increased from a negligible 0.067% to 5.2%, health expenditure rose from 4.1% to 6.3%, and infrastructure investment climbed from 2.5% to 10% of the budget. The Crown administration prioritized impartial provision of basic services—constructing public roads that connected isolated communities to markets, establishing an elementary public school system, and expanding health services—representing what historians describe as a neutral form of government that protected the masses from planter exploitation. While Jamaica still lagged behind more densely populated Caribbean colonies in absolute terms, Crown Colony rule eliminated the wage manipulation motive that had driven the planter government to systematically underfund human and infrastructural development, marking a significant improvement in both rights and economic opportunities for the formerly enslaved population and their descendants.

== Legacy ==
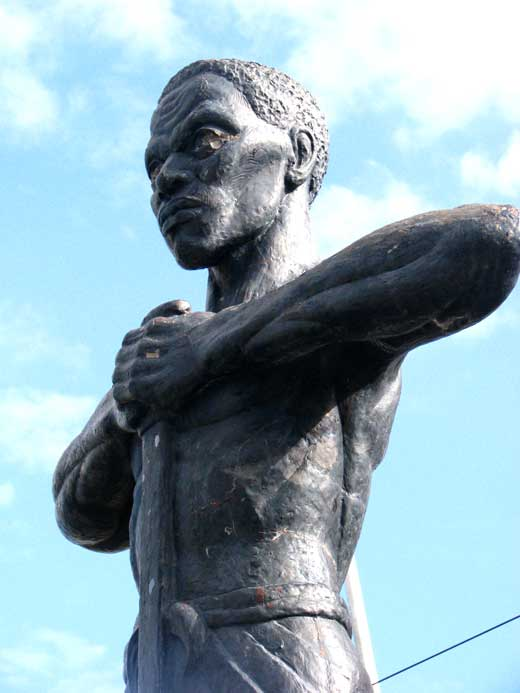
Statue of Paul Bogle in Morant Bay, Jamaica

In 1969, Paul Bogle and George William Gordon were among several men who were named as Jamaican National Heroes, the highest honour in the nation.

=== The Rebellion in popular culture ===
Several Jamaicans in the first half of the 20th century wrote about the Rebellion:

- H. G. de Lisser, long-time editor of the newspaper The Gleaner, wrote a novel entitled Revenge (1918). It is now out of print.
- Roger Mais, best known for his 1954 Rastafarian novel Brother Man, wrote the play George William Gordon, about the mixed-race politician who was tried under martial law and executed following the Rebellion, the play was first staged in 1938.
- V. S. Reid devoted his novel New Day (1949) to commemorating the rebellion.

Non-Jamaican authors have also treated the Morant Bay Rebellion.

- It is the subject of chapter XI of the novel Caribbean (1989) by American James A. Michener.
- It is also a setting for part of the novel James Miranda Barry (1999) by Patricia Duncker. (It was reissued in paperback as The Doctor: A Novel in 2002.)
- The rebellion is also cited in the short story "L'alfier nero" (i.e. "The Black Bishop" in the game of chess) by the Italian author Arrigo Boito, where it is mistaken for a slave rebellion.
- The rebellion is mentioned throughout the historical drama series A Thousand Blows.

The rebellion has been featured in music as well. Reggae artists Third World featured the title track "1865 (96° In The Shade)" on their second album in 1977; the song described the events of the Morant Bay rebellion from the point of view of Paul Bogle and George William Gordon:

You caught me on the loose, fighting to be free, now you show me a noose on a cotton tree, entertainment for you, martyrdom for me ... Some may suffer and some may burn, but I know that one day my people will learn, as sure as the sun shines, way up in the sky, today I stand here a victim – the truth is I'll never die.
