= Morant Bay =

- Town
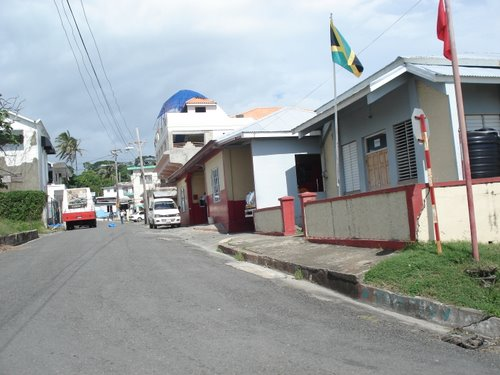

- Location within Jamaica
- Coordinates: 17.8819°N 76.4074°W
- Country: Jamaica
- Parish: St Thomas
- Time zone: UTC-05:00 (EST)

Morant Bay is a town in southeastern Jamaica and the capital of the parish of St. Thomas, located about 40 kilometres east of Kingston, the capital. The parish has a population of 94,410.

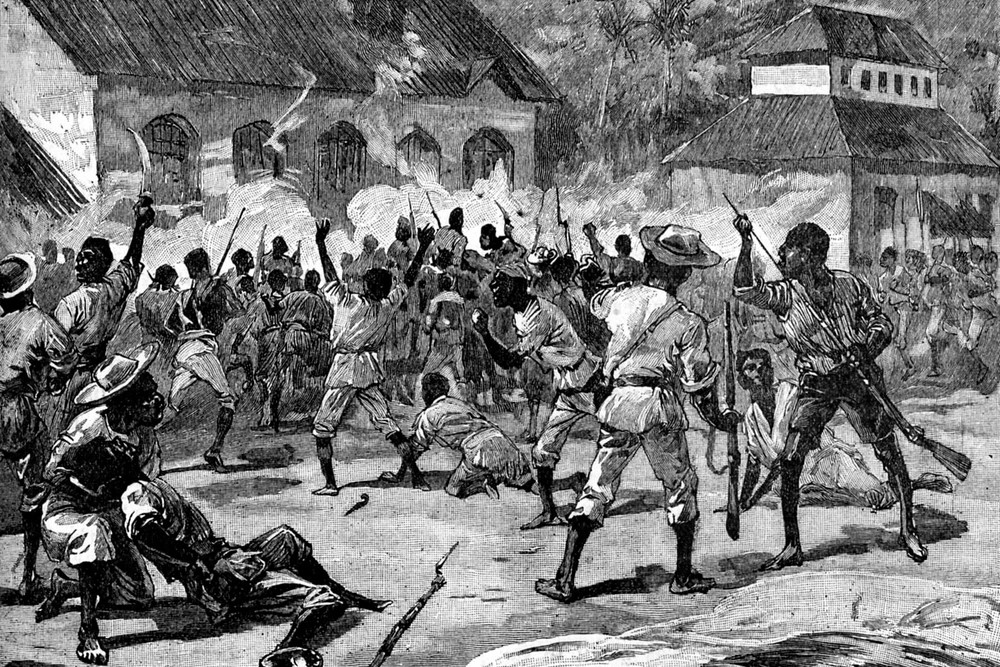
The Morant Bay rebellion, 1865

During the nineteenth century, the parish was an area of sugar cane plantations, with a majority of black enslave descendant after the abolition of slavery. The Morant Bay Rebellion started on 11 October 1865, with a march by hundreds of people from the parish to the court house to protest poor conditions in the parish. After seven men were shot and killed by volunteer militia, the people burned the court house and other nearby buildings; a total of 25 people died on both sides in this confrontation.

Over the next two days, hundreds of Jamaican people took control throughout the parish. The governor ordered troops to arrest and suppress the revolutionists; they killed more than 400 persons outright and arrested more than 300, in both cases including many innocent people. Many of those arrested were executed, flogged or sentenced to long terms. This was the only major revolt (as distinguished from slave rebellions and worker uprisings), in Jamaican history. The court house was rebuilt. It stood until 2007, when it was burned down. Court functions were held in other facilities before a new court house was completed and opened in 2014.

Morant Bay's sister cities are Uxbridge, Ontario, Canada and Hartford, Connecticut, United States.

Morant Bay is the birthplace of Miss World 2019 Toni-Ann Singh.

== Attractions ==
- Memorial Garden

Opposite the court house is a memorial garden for Jamaican soldiers who lost their lives during World War I. A monument has been erected at the centre of the gardens in their honour.

- Morant Bay Fort

Behind the court house is a small park containing the ruins of the Morant Bay Fort. The fort dates from 1758 and was designed to hold nine guns. Three cannons remain there today. During an excavation behind the court house in 1973 in the park, the bodies of 79 people were discovered. They are believed to have been killed during the 1865 rebellion. Their remains were reinterred in a mass grave in the park. A plaque was installed to commemorate their lives.

- Morant Bay Court House

The Morant Bay rebellion began as a protest outside the court house. The court house was set on fire during the rebellion but was rebuilt afterwards. This historic court house was later destroyed by fire in 2007. A statue of Paul Bogle sculpted by Edna Manley (wife of former Premier of Jamaica Norman Manley and mother of former Prime Minister of Jamaica Michael Manley), had been installed outside the court house, but was put into storage after the 2007 fire. A new court house was completed and opened in August 2014. "The 9,013 square-foot building includes two courtrooms with jury boxes, two judges' chambers, a registry, clerk's office, jury room, witness room, lunch room, sick bay, holding area with police post, public sanitary facilities, and a 40 feet container for storage of files and accommodation for the bailiff."

- St. Thomas Parish Church

Located to the West of the Court House. It was constructed in 1865 to replace another church which previously occupied the site.
