= Jamaica Committee =

1865 British pressure group

The Jamaica Committee was a group set up in Great Britain in 1865, which called for Edward Eyre, Governor of Jamaica, to be tried for his excesses in suppressing the Morant Bay rebellion of 1865. More radical members of the Committee wanted him tried for the murder of British subjects (Jamaica was at that time a Crown Colony), under the rule of law. The Committee included English liberals, such as John Bright, John Stuart Mill, Charles Darwin, Thomas Henry Huxley, Thomas Hughes, Herbert Spencer and A. V. Dicey, the last of whom would eventually become known for his scholarship on the conflict of laws.

Other prominent members of the committee included Charles Buxton, Frederic Harrison, Edmond Beales, Frederick Chesson, Leslie Stephen, Thomas Hill Green, Henry Fawcett, Goldwin Smith, Charles Lyell and Edward Frankland.

The counsel to the Jamaica Committee was James Fitzjames Stephen, who held that the defendants were guilty of legal murder, but extended considerable sympathy to them and intimated that they were probably morally justified. From then on, Mill was cool to him.

Thomas Carlyle set up Governor Eyre Defence and Aid Committee in support of Eyre. His supporters included John Ruskin, Charles Kingsley, Charles Dickens, Alfred Tennyson and John Tyndall.

The Jamaica Committee was ultimately unsuccessful in its goal of having Eyre prosecuted.

== See also ==
- Phillips v Eyre
