= Order of the National Hero (Jamaica) =

National honour in Jamaica

- Awarded for: Services of the most distinguished nature
- Presented by: Jamaica
- Eligibility: Jamaican citizens or Jamaican born
- Post-nominals: National Hero of Jamaica; ONH
- Motto: "Out of many, one people" "He built a city which hath foundations"
- Established: 1968
- First award: 1969

Highlights
- Total awarded posthumously: 6
- Total recipients: 7
- Neck ribbon Sash ribbon

Precedence
- Next (higher): None
- Next (lower): Order of the Nation

The Order of the National Hero is an honour awarded by the government of Jamaica. It is a part of the Jamaican honours system that has been in place since 1969.

== Description ==
The highest of the five Jamaican Orders of the Societies of Honour, the Order of National Hero is given only to Jamaican citizens for "services of the most distinguished nature" to the nation. It can be awarded either posthumously or on the occasion of the recipient's retirement from active public life.

Recipients are permitted to wear the insignia of the Order, and they are given the style of "The Right Excellent". They are also traditionally honoured with a tomb or monument in National Heroes Park, as well as a plaque or shield displayed in some prominent national place, such as the Institute of Jamaica. The title of "National Hero of Jamaica" or the post-nominal letters ONH can be used following a recipient's name.

The Order of National Hero was created by the National Honours and Awards Act, which was passed by Parliament in 1969. This act also designated Paul Bogle, George William Gordon, and Marcus Garvey as the first three recipients of the honour.

The insignia of the Order of National Hero is a fourteen-pointed gold and white star, centered on a black enameled medallion. The medallion features the Jamaican coat of arms in gold relief, and it is encircled by the motto of the Order, which is "He built a city which hath foundations". The insignia is typically worn on a neck ribbon in the national colors of Jamaica (black, gold and green), along with a laurel wreath of gold and green enamel.

== Recipients ==
As of 2015, the Order of National Hero has been conferred upon seven recipients:

- Sir Alexander Bustamante, first prime minister
- Marcus Garvey, political activist and philosopher
- George William Gordon, critic of the colonial government
- Norman Manley, first and only Premier of Jamaica (first Leader of the Opposition)
- Nanny of the Maroons, leader of the Windward Maroons, composed of escaped slaves and their descendants
- Samuel Sharpe, leader of the Baptist War slave rebellion
- Paul Bogle, deacon and activist, leader of the 1865 Morant Bay protesters
