= Order of Merit (Jamaica) =

Award in the Jamaican honours system

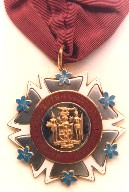
- Awarded for: Eminent international distinction in the field of science, the arts, literature or any other endeavour
- Presented by: Jamaica
- Eligibility: Citizens of Jamaica and foreigners
- Post-nominals: OM
- Motto: "He that does truth comes into the light"
- Status: Currently awarded
- Ribbon of the order

Precedence
- Next (higher): Order of Excellence
- Next (lower): Order of Jamaica

The Order of Merit is part of the Jamaican honours system, and it is the fourth-highest honour awarded by the nation of Jamaica. The Order of Merit is conferred upon Jamaicans or distinguished citizens of other countries who have achieved distinction in the field of science, the arts, literature or any other endeavour. The award can be held by no more than 15 living persons. It is not given to more than two people in any one year.

Members and Honorary Members of the order are entitled to wear the insignia of the order as a decoration and to be styled "The Honourable". In addition, they can append the post-nominal letters OM to their names, or OM (Hon.) in the case of Honorary Members. The order's motto is "He that does the truth comes into the light."

The Order of Merit was originally one that was awarded to foreign heads of state, but this function was taken over by the Order of Excellence in 2003.

== Recipients ==
=== Living ===
- Donald Jasper Harris (2021)
- Orlando Patterson (2020)
- Anthony Abraham Chen (2008)
- Gerald Lalor
- Albert Belville Lockhart, co-inventor of Canasol
- Sir Meredith Alister McIntyre
- Mervyn Morris
- Edward Robinson (2008)
- Sir Willard White (2000)

=== Deceased ===
- Bunny Wailer
- Louise Bennett-Coverley (2001)
- Jimmy Cliff (October 20, 2003)
- William Knibb (1845)
- Thomas Lecky
- The Most Honourable Edna Manley (1980)
- The Most Honourable Michael Manley
- Bob Marley (February 1981)
- Herb McKenley (2004)
- Rex Nettleford
- Mary Seacole (1990, posthumously)
- Sir Philip Manderson Sherlock (1989)
- M. G. Smith (1972)
- Carl Stone (1993)
- Peter Tosh (2012, posthumously)
- Cicely Williams
- Fidel Castro
- Sir Derek Walcott
- Manley Elisha West, co-inventor of Canasol
- Sir Shridath Ramphal
