= Orders, decorations, and medals of Jamaica =

National honour system of Jamaica

The Jamaican honours system has developed as a unique entity since the passage of the National Honours and Awards Act by the Parliament of Jamaica in 1969 (Act No. 21 of 1969). The system is modelled largely on the British honours system, which was formerly conferred on Jamaicans.

The Governor-General of Jamaica serves as the Chancellor of the orders. Membership is conferred by the Governor-General upon the advice of the Prime Minister of Jamaica.

Most Jamaican honours allow recipients to place post-nominal letters after their names, and some honours include pre-nominal styles.

== Honours ==
The honours in this Jamaican system are as follows, from highest to lowest in rank:

Description	Ribbon	Comment
The Order of the National Hero is conferred upon any citizen of Jamaica who has rendered service of the most distinguished nature to Jamaica. Membership in the order entitles the recipient to the pre-nominal style of 'The Right Excellent' and to the post-nominal title of 'National Hero of Jamaica'.		Neck Ribbon
The Order of the National Hero is conferred upon any citizen of Jamaica who has rendered service of the most distinguished nature to Jamaica. Membership in the order entitles the recipient to the pre-nominal style of 'The Right Excellent' and to the post-nominal title of 'National Hero of Jamaica'.		Sash Ribbon
The Order of the Nation is the second-highest Jamaican order and was instituted in 1973 by Regulations made under the National Honours and Awards Act. It is often awarded to Governors-General and to those people who have held the office of Prime Minister. Members of this order and their spouses are entitled to the pre-nominal style of 'The Most Honourable' and to the post-nominal title 'Order of the Nation' or 'ON'.		Neck Ribbon
The Order of the Nation is the second-highest Jamaican order and was instituted in 1973 by Regulations made under the National Honours and Awards Act. It is often awarded to Governors-General and to those people who have held the office of Prime Minister. Members of this order and their spouses are entitled to the pre-nominal style of 'The Most Honourable' and to the post-nominal title 'Order of the Nation' or 'ON'.		Sash Ribbon
The Order of Excellence, introduced in 2003, is the newest addition to the Jamaican honours system. It was created to be bestowed upon foreign heads of state or government. Prior to this, foreign heads of state or government received the Order of Merit.		Sash Ribbon
The Order of Merit is the fourth-highest Jamaican order as of 2003, and it is meant for any citizen of Jamaica who has achieved eminent international distinction in the fields of science, the arts, literature or any other endeavour. Honorary membership in this order is available to distinguished citizens of other nations. Membership in the order entitles the recipient to the pre-nominal style of 'The Honourable' and to the post-nominal title 'Order of Merit' or 'OM'.		Neck Ribbon
The Order of Jamaica is the fifth order in precedence in Jamaica. It is awarded to any Jamaican citizen of outstanding distinction. Like the Order of Merit, there is also a class of honorary members for foreign nationals. Membership in this order is considered to be the equivalent of a British knighthood. Members of this order are entitled to the pre-nominal style of 'The Honourable' and to the post-nominal title 'Order of Jamaica' or 'OJ'.		Sash Ribbon (3 inches wide)
The Order of Jamaica is the fifth order in precedence in Jamaica. It is awarded to any Jamaican citizen of outstanding distinction. Like the Order of Merit, there is also a class of honorary members for foreign nationals. Membership in this order is considered to be the equivalent of a British knighthood. Members of this order are entitled to the pre-nominal style of 'The Honourable' and to the post-nominal title 'Order of Jamaica' or 'OJ'.		Neck Ribbon (1½ inches wide)
The Order of Distinction is the sixth order in precedence in Jamaica. It was intended to be the equivalent of the British Order of the British Empire. It has two ranks, Commander and Officer. In this order, as well, honorary memberships may be given to foreign nationals at the rank of Commander or Officer.		Neck Ribbon and Medal Ribbon
The Badge of Honour is awarded to civilian residents of Jamaica and to foreign nationals who are employed in Jamaica's Diplomatic and Consular Missions overseas. It is awarded in the three categories of Gallantry, Meritorious Service, and Long and Faithful Service.		Ribbon bar
The Medal of Honour is awarded in two categories, Gallantry and Meritorious Service, to officers and other members of the uniformed services.		

In exercise of the royal prerogative, Charles III, as King of Jamaica, awards the Order of St Michael and St George (GCMG) to the incumbent Governor-General of Jamaica. This, however, is mainly ceremonial. No other British/Commonwealth honour is awarded in Jamaica, but they are able to be awarded with advice given to the King of Jamaica, via the incumbent Prime Minister of Jamaica with approval from the Cabinet of Jamaica.

== Medals ==
Description	Ribbon	Comment
The Queen Elizabeth II Diamond Jubilee Medal was awarded in 2012 to members of the Jamaica Defence Force, the Jamaica Constabulary Force, the Department of Correctional Services, the Jamaica Fire Brigade, and the Emergency Services, to commemorate the Queen's Diamond Jubilee.		Medal
The Queen Elizabeth II Platinum Jubilee Medal was awarded in 2022 to members of the Jamaica Defence Force, the Jamaica Constabulary Force, the Department of Correctional Services, the Jamaica Fire Brigade and the Emergency Medical Services, to commemorate the Queen's Platinum Jubilee.		Medal

== Awards ==
Description	Ribbon	Comment
The Prime Minister's Medal of Appreciation is an award presented by the Prime Minister of Jamaica to those individuals whom he feels are worthy to be recognized for services to Jamaica or to those Jamaicans who have excelled in personal achievements outside Jamaica. It is not part of the Jamaican National Honours system. Most recipients will not advance into the Honours system, but a few have been appointed into the Honours system.		Neck Ribbon
