= Cecil Baugh =

Jamaican master potter and artist

The Honourable Cecil Archibald Baugh OJ, CD
- Born: November 22, 1908; Portland, Colony of Jamaica, British Empire
- Died: June 28, 2005 (aged 96)
- Occupation: Potter
- Spouse: Iris Baugh (née Johnson) (m. 1975)

Cecil Archibald Baugh OJ, CD (November 22, 1908 – June 28, 2005), was a Jamaican master potter and artist.

== Early life ==
Baugh was born on November 22, 1908, in Bangor Ridge, Portland Parish, Jamaica to Isaac Baugh, a sawyer, and Emma Cobran-Baugh, a farmer. He attended the Bangor Ridge Primary School. Baugh then moved to Kingston, the capital city, and began an apprenticeship under Susan and Ethel Trenchfield from Saint Elizabeth Parish. Later, he worked alongside Wilfred Lord a free form potter. Baugh sold much of his early pottery as a 'yabba man', selling at street markets. Baugh then worked as a groundsman at the St. James Country Club in Montego Bay, and later as a door-to-door pottery salesman in Kingston. He soon returned to Montego Bay where he opened his own studio and kiln, the Cornwall Clay Works. In 1938, at an arts and crafts exhibition in Kingston, he met the painter Albert Huie, who became a lifelong friend.

== Later life ==
In 1941, Baugh volunteered for the British Army. He served as a sapper with the Royal Engineers for a year in Clitheroe, Lancashire. He was stationed in Cairo, Egypt for three years, where he was introduced to a method of pottery glazing which mirrored his self-invented 'Egyptian Blue'. Baugh was then transferred to Aden, Yemen, where he was given time off to attend art school. In 1946 he returned to Jamaica where he opened a pottery studio on Mountain View Avenue in Kingston. He then travelled to the United Kingdom in June 1948, on board the Empire Windrush, where he studied with Margaret Leach and the famous British potter Bernard Leach. He returned to Jamaica in 1949 and in 1950 mounted his first one-man exhibition. In 1962, Baugh, Albert Huie, Linden Leslie, Jerry Isaacs, and Edna Manley formed the Jamaica School of Art, now the Edna Manley College of the Visual and Performing Arts. Baugh taught at the institution until his retirement in 1975.

== Honors and awards ==
Baugh received a Silver Musgrave Medal from the Institute of Jamaica in 1964. In 1975, he was awarded the Order of Distinction, Commander class, by the Government of Jamaica, and in 1977, he received the Norman Manley Award of Excellence. In 1980, Baugh as awarded the Centenary Medal of the Institute of Jamaica. In 1981, he received the Jamaica Bauxite Institute Award, and in 1984 the Gold Musgrave Medal by the Institute of Jamaica for his book Baugh, Jamaica's Master Potter. In 1991 the National Gallery of Jamaica opened the Cecil Baugh Gallery of Ceramics as part of the development of the visual arts on the Island. In 1994, he received the George William Gordon Award for Excellence in the Visual Arts, and the Order of Jamaica in 2003. In 2004 he received the Gleaner Honour Award for Excellence in Arts and Culture.

== Personal life and death ==
In 1928, Baugh married Susan Trenchfield's niece, Beryl Ebanks, with whom he had three daughters, one of whom predeceased him. His second wife, Iris Baugh (née Johnson), whom he married in 1975, also predeceased him. Baugh died on June 28, 2005, at the age of 96. He is survived by his daughters, Leila and Myrtle.
