= Dorothy Henriques-Wells =

Jamaican painter and educator (1926–2018)

- Henriques-Wells with her daughter
- Born: Dorothy Henriques; 1926; Saint Andrew Parish, Colony of Jamaica, British Empire
- Died: 5 March 2018 (aged 92); Miami, Florida, US
- Education: Ontario College of Art
- Known for: Watercolour painting
- Awards: Silver Musgrave Medal for Art (1987)

Dorothy Henriques-Wells (1926 – 5 March 2018) was a Jamaican painter and art teacher. She is known for her sparse, vibrant watercolors depicting the plants and landscapes of Jamaica. She has works in the National Gallery of Jamaica and received the Silver Musgrave Medal for Art in 1987. Henriques-Wells graduated from the Ontario College of Art in 1951, where she was the institution's first Black alumna. She taught art at Jamaican high schools and colleges for over two decades.

== Early life and education ==
Dorothy Henriques was born in 1926 in Saint Andrew Parish, Jamaica. Her mother, Lilieth Henriques, was an oil painter and her father, Llewellyn, was a jeweler. She drew inspiration as an artist from her mother, who painted the landscape surrounding their estate and the plants that she grew.

By the age of 12, Dorothy had voiced her intention to become an artist. From 1936 to 1943, she attended Wolmer's High School for Girls in Kingston, where she won several awards for her art. She was tutored by Koren der Harootian, an Armenian artist, at his home in Barbican from 1939 to 1943. After finishing high school, she moved to Toronto where she studied at the Ontario College of Art (now OCAD University) from 1947 to 1951. She learned portraiture and developed her realistic watercolour style there. She was the first Black person to graduate from the university since its inception in 1876. In her thesis painting, her model was a Black woman wearing a traditional headwrap. She also studied at the Minneapolis School of Art.

== Career ==
After graduation, Henriques-Wells returned to Jamaica in 1951 and began her career as an art teacher at various training colleges and high schools. For over 20 years she taught students at St Andrew High School for Girls, St Hugh's High School, and Meadowbrook High School. She taught certificate students at Mico Teachers' College and The University of the West Indies in Mona.

Henriques-Wells was a founding member of the Jamaican Artists and Craftsmen Guild. She ran a gallery for local artists called The Art Wheel from 1968 to 1970. During the same time, she painted 360 works depicting the flora, landscapes and life of the Caribbean as part of a commission for Norwegian Cruise Line that was displayed in three of their ships—the MS Southward, the MS Skyward, and the MS Starward.

In the late 1970s, Henriques-Wells and her family moved to Barbados where the Caribbean Development Bank commissioned her to create a portrait of economist W. Arthur Lewis. She lived near Dakar in Senegal in the early 1980s. Using burlap canvases, she painted the markets and people of Senegal. Henriques-Wells later moved to Washington DC, before settling in Miami, Florida.

The Institute of Jamaica awarded her with the Silver Musgrave Medal for Art in 1987. She was a recipient of the Alexander Cooper Master of Craft award in 2007.

Henriques-Wells died on 5 March 2018 at her home in Miami. She was 92.

Fellow Jamaican artist Albert Huie's 1952 work, Portrait of Dotty Henriques, is part of the National Gallery of Jamaica's collection.

== Art ==
Principally a watercolourist, Henriques-Wells is regarded as a master painter in Jamaica. She often painted the landscapes and flora of Jamaica, and was recognised for her "brilliant transparent hues and overall lyricism". OCAD University professor Andrea Fatona described Henriques-Wells' works as both sparse and emotive with a "poetic, realist approach to her subjects" that is "flowing and vibrant with sun-kissed colours".

Henriques-Wells' works are included in the collection of the National Gallery of Jamaica (NGJ), During her career, she participated in many solo and group exhibitions, both internationally and throughout Jamaica. She exhibited at the Victoria Craft Market Tercentenary, at the NGJ's Biennial and Annual National exhibitions, and at the Institute of Jamaica's All Island shows in Kingston. She was part of the 1976 exhibition Five Centuries of Art in Jamaica since its discovery, as well as group exhibitions at the World Bank building in Washington, DC. Her final exhibition was in the Wynwood neighborhood of Miami in 2016.

Art historian Edward Lucie-Smith featured Henriques-Wells in his 2001 book Flora: Gardens and Plants in Art and Literature. She was also among the artists featured in Wayne Lawrence's 2010 book The Art of Jamaica. He noted that Henriques-Wells created her watercolours without any preliminary sketches.

Jamaican artist Jasmine Thomas-Girvan recalls seeing Henriques-Wells as a child and credits her with inspiring her to become an artist.

== Personal life ==
Henriques-Wells married Carl F. Wells, a veterinary surgeon, in 1956. They had three children. Her daughter Mary Wells is a filmmaker. Henriques-Wells was a well-known figure in Kingston, sometimes wearing "huge straw hats with fresh flowers stuck in the brim and shocking pink dashiki dresses."
