= John Dunkley =

Jamaican painter (1991–2012)

- Born: 10 December 1891; Savanna-la-Mar, Colony of Jamaica, British Empire
- Died: 17 February 1947 (aged 55); Kingston, Jamaica
- Known for: Painting
- Notable work: Banana Plantation; Lonely Road; Feeding the Fishes (1940); Diamond Wedding
- Movement: The Intuitives, Art brut, Outsider art
- Spouse: Cassie Fraser

John Dunkley (10 December 1891 – 17 February 1947) was a self-taught Jamaican painter and sculptor. Though his fame is largely posthumous, he is considered one of the island's most significant artists.

== Early life ==
Dunkley's early life was filled with both adversity and adventure, which may account, in part, for his unique artistic vision. At the age of seven, an accident damaged one of his eyes, affecting his ability to learn in school. As a result, he was sent for by his father who was living in Panama. Upon arrival, the teen-aged Dunkley discovered his father had recently died and was buried the day before he landed.

Deprived of his father's wealth, Dunkley started earning his own livelihood. Like many of his impoverished black countrymen, he sought work throughout the Caribbean, stopping in Colón, Panama; Chiriqui, Panama; Costa Rica and Camaguey, Cuba. A banana plantation where he worked in Panama would later inspire a number of his paintings. He reportedly started out from Cuba for California to study dentistry when an armed upheaval took place. He lost all of his belongings, but was spared his life. According to his wife, Dunkley, who was a Freemason, sent out the Masons' distress signal, which was answered by a lodge member on a passing ship. Welcomed aboard, he signed on as a sailor, traveling to England, Scotland, North and South America and numerous other places. He may also have worked on the construction of the Panama Canal.

He returned to Chiriqui, where he set up a barbershop and started painting in his spare time, encouraged by Clarence Rock, a prominent Panamanian photographer. Sometime between 1926 and 1930, Dunkley returned to Jamaica, establishing his barbering business on lower Princess Street in Kingston. He covered the entirety of the shop's exterior with small painted signs depicting flowers, trees and vines. H. Delves Molesworth, then Secretary of the Institute of Jamaica, was attracted by the paintings. A key figure in the early Jamaican art movement, the young Englishman encouraged Dunkley to keep painting.

== Career ==
Dunkley's scenes are full of references to the unsettling political, economic and social conditions roiling colonial Jamaica in the 1930s and 1940s. The work reflects the racial tension, economic inequality and desire for self-government felt by Jamaicans and other Caribbean islanders. His creative output also coincided with the search for forms of "authentic" Jamaican expression that preceded the independence movement. Above all, though, Dunkley's oeuvre is a singular exploration of a complicated and often-dark personal and cultural identity.

He is associated with a group of Jamaican artists known as "The Intuitives". The group includes Mallica Reynolds, David Miller Senior, David Miller Junior, Everald Brown, David Pottinger and Albert Huie. His work is generally darker in tone, and has been described as sharing characteristics with Wifredo Lam's paintings. Some critics see commonality with the work of French Post-Impressionist Henri Rousseau.

Dunkley was deeply involved in the socio-political issues of his day, in particular the rampant racism that saw him become a pan-Africanist and an admirer of Marcus Garvey.

== Later life ==
While continuing to ply his trade as a barber, Dunkley maintained his artistic pursuits. Active for little more than a decade before his early death, his output as a painter was small. Less than 50 paintings are known, but they reveal a unique and compelling aesthetic. There is no clearly discernible development in Dunkley's work. Anticipating impending fame, the artist kept his paintings and persisted in refining, even overworking, them.

Most of the paintings are imagined, surrealistic landscapes replete with hidden symbolism. The surfaces are delicate and tapestry-like. Fantastic vegetation, trees and shrubs with overblown flowers, are contrasted with bare truncated branches, in a way that encourages the viewer's understanding of them as phallic symbols. A preoccupation with the link between eroticism and death, the Freudian Eros/Thantos concept, is also in evidence. Small mammals, crabs, birds and often spiders with their complex webs, inhabit the gloomy woods. Human figures are rare, though human presence is implied by an occasional house painted in the distance or at the edge of a wood. Dunkley's most persistent motif is the pathway or road, which sometimes pushes through the vegetation to suggest great depth. In "Back to Nature" (circa 1939), the path, impressed with footprints, bifurcates to encircle a heart-shaped grave.

A distinct group of less claustrophobic paintings are thought to be his last. In "Lonely Road", "Springboard", "Woman Feeding Fish" and "Footbridge", the typically dense vegetation gives way to more expansive vistas and clearer skies. The backgrounds are white rather than grey. Far fewer elements populate the landscape. In some, the black outlines of sparse vegetation are silhouetted against the sky. Though less confined, the works are still disquieting. Surreal touches, such as the isolated platform in "Springboard", leaves pushing up through the cracks in "Feeding the Fishes" and the unstable support in "Footbridge" contribute to the sense of unease.

Dunkley was inspired occasionally by current events. There is a mixed media piece depicting boxer Joe Louis. In the "Good Shepherd" (circa 1938), populist politician Alexander Bustamante is shown gathering flocks of sheep, while in the distance a few straggly goats run away. When the Roosevelt administration built Vernam Field at Sandy Gully during World War II, Dunkley made a painting of the president. From a large piece of Lignum Vitae cut down for the military base, he carved a seated portrait of a proud Jamaican man and named him "Sandy Gully".

Dunkley's small body of sculptures, primarily wood-carvings, are less complicated/accomplished than his paintings. In addition to "Sandy Gully" (1940), notable works include "Old Joe", an intense portrait of a black man clasping his knees while bent in prayer, and "Acrobat", a mahogany carving of a man contorting himself with his head between his legs and beneath his posterior.

During his lifetime, Dunkley received some local recognition for his artwork as a result of group exhibitions. In 1938, a carving of a reindeer (since destroyed) won a prize at St. George's Exhibition in Kingston. The following year, Dunkley received a bronze medal for "notable contribution to the art of the world" at the New York World's Fair. Three works, "Back to Nature", "Jerboa" and "Pastures" were exhibited at the Institute of Jamaica's 1945 Survey of West Indian Painting, a show that also traveled to Canada. Four paintings including "Banana Plantation" were exhibited in London in 1946.

Dunkley was in failing health for many months prior to his death. He died at 55 years of age, probably from lung cancer, on 17 February 1947. His large funeral was attended by both rich and poor.

== Posthumous fame ==
Following his death, Dunkley's reputation grew. In 1948, he was honored with a memorial exhibition at the Institute of Jamaica.

=== Relevant Exhibitions ===
In 1951, his painting "Jerboa" was shown at the First Caribbean Exhibition in San Juan, Puerto Rico. A retrospective of Dunkley's work, with fellow intuitive artist Henry Daley, was exhibited in 1960 at the Institute of Jamaica. In 1969, the painting "Diamond Wedding" was shown at "Art in Jamaica Since the Thirties" at Spelman College in Atlanta, Georgia. Dunkley was represented by two pieces, "Jerboa" and "Back to Nature" in the exhibition "Three Decades of Jamaican Painting" at Commonwealth Institute Art Gallery in London (1971). An exhibition of Dunkley's paintings and sculptures was held at the National Gallery of Jamaica, 9 December 1976 to 19 February 1977. With the resurrection of a fair percentage of his oeuvre in the retrospective and a subsequent permanent display of his work, Dunkley regained his position as a true Jamaican master.

From 26 May 2017 through 14 January 2018, the Pérez Art Museum Miami (PAMM) held the first major exhibition of Dunkley's work outside of his native country. John Dunkley: Neither Day nor Night was composed of forty-five works, paintings from the 1930s and 1940s, as well as rare carved wood and stone figures. A monograph of same title was published on the occasion.

The show traveled to the National Gallery of Jamaica, where it was on display from 29 April 2018 to 29 July 2018, and it was then on display at the American Folk Art Museum in New York from 30 October 2018 to 24 February 2019.

In a New York Times review about Dunkley's work, critic Roberta Smith states that

"Working in a faded-tapestry palette of mostly black, dark brown and white tinted with green, rose and yellow, he energized his images with disorienting shifts in scale, perspective and form. Bushes and trees suggest large vegetables or flowers; chopped-off tree trunks intimate water pipes, corncobs or phalluses. The branches they sprout are often trees unto themselves. Numerous paths and lanes disappear into dark forests or tunnels while reinforcing the flatness of the canvas."

The National Gallery of Jamaica's version contained work not shown at PAMM that explored the themes of tourism, immigration and the emergence of cultural nationalism during Dunkley's lifetime. "Daylight Come…Picturing Dunkley’s Jamaica" served as a complement to "John Dunkley: Neither Day nor Night." It included rare photographs, artifacts and film footage from the turn of the 20th century to the Jamaican Nationalist movement, providing further context to Dunkley's output.
