= Donnette Zacca =

Jamaican photographer (born 1957)

Donnette Ingrid Zacca
- Born: 2 May 1957 (age 67); St. James, Colony of Jamaica, British Empire
- Education: Edna Manley College of the Visual and Performing Arts; Maryland Institute College of Art
- Occupation: Photographer

Donnette Ingrid Zacca (born 2 May 1957) is a Jamaican fine art photographer, lecturer, and artist. The Jamaican Magazine and the National Gallery of Jamaica have listed her among the best photographers in the nation. She has exhibited at the National Gallery's Biennial and was the recipient of the Institute of Jamaica's Silver Musgrave Medal in 2015.

== Early life and education ==
Zacca was born in St James, Jamaica. Zacca cites her having grown up in rural Jamaica as the beginning of her appreciation of the outdoors. One of her earliest exposures to photography was when her uncle had returned from the United States and gifted her a Kodak Instamatic camera when she around 13-14 years old. It was a small point and shoot camera with 24 exposures. Zacca attended Mt. Alvernia High School. She majored in graphic design and art education at the Edna Manley College of the Visual and Performing Arts. In 1988, Zacca received a USAID scholarship to study photography at Ohio University. Unfortunately, she experienced discrimination during her time there when another student had destroyed her artwork. In 2004, Zacca received her Masters of Fine Art degree from Maryland Institute College of Art.

== Career ==
Zacca currently works as a photography lecturer and lab technician at Edna Manley College of the Visual and Performing Arts. She is the co-founder of the Jamaican photography club, Just Black and White (JBW). Zacca describes her art as the primary process of expressing her ideas. Her approach to photography is based on the observation of her surroundings and the issues and concerns of women.

== Personal life ==
Zacca currently resides in Kingston, Jamaica.

== Achievements ==
- Commissioned by the Jamaica Postal Service to create 12 stamps in 2003.
- Received the Silver Musgrave Medal for outstanding merit.
- Received the Jamaica Cultural Development Annual Photography Award.
- Received the National Heritage Trust Photography Competition award.
- Received the National Gallery of Jamaica purchase award.
