= Petrona Morrison =

Jamaican sculptor and artist

Petrona Morrison (born 1954) is a Jamaican sculptor and media artist. Her work is largely inspired by African art; she uses found objects in assemblages that have both personal and broader social themes.

A native of Manchester, Jamaica, Morrison was sketching from the time she was a child. She began training as an artist at McMaster University in Canada, graduating in 1976. In the mid-1980s she studied for her MFA at Howard University in Washington, DC, during which time she spent a year in Kenya. She divided her time between the United States and Jamaica before returning home for good in 1995; she continues to travel for residencies. She has taught at the Edna Manley College of the Visual and Performing Arts since 1988.

She was artist-in-residence at the Studio Museum in Harlem. Her work may be seen in the collection of the National Gallery of Jamaica. She was awarded the Gold Musgrave Medal in 2014. In 2017 Morrison exhibited work in the Jamaica biennial.

== Selected exhibitions ==
- Petrona Morrison and Veronica Ryan: Sculptural Works. Bronx Museum of the Arts, United States, 1996–1997.
- Annual Exhibition, National Gallery of Jamaica, Jamaica, 1999. Work: "Absence"
- Jamaica Biennial, National Gallery of Jamaica, Jamaica, 2017. Work: "Selfie."
