= Errol Morrison =

Jamaican scientist (born 1945)

Errol York St Aubyn Morrison (born 21 September 1945) is a Jamaican scientist and academic administrator who was president of the University of Technology, Jamaica, from 2007 to 2014.

He entered the University College of the West Indies where he acquired an interest in Biochemistry. He subsequently gained a medical degree from the Royal University of Malta, a master's degree from University College London, and a doctorate and two professorships from the University of the West Indies where he served as Pro-Vice Chancellor and Dean of the School of Graduate Studies and Research. He then left the university to become President of the University of Technology, Jamaica.

He has carried out pioneering work in the medical field with a particular interest in diabetes. In 1982, he pioneered the formation of the Diabetes Association of the Caribbean, which now has 26 member countries, and was its president from 1985 to 1987 and its vice president from 1989 to 1991. In 1991, he launched the University Diabetes Outreach Project (UDOP) with the help of a Wolfson Foundation grant. He played a key role in partnerships between the International Diabetes Federation and the Pan American Health Organization (PAHO/WHO), in responding to the emerging pandemic of type 2 diabetes, by applying the St. Vincent Declaration intervention model to the Americas, in the form of the Declaration of the Americas on Diabetes or DOTA (1996).

In 1999 he was awarded a Musgrave Gold Medal by the Institute of Jamaica.
