= Carl Abrahams =

Jamaican painter

Carl Abrahams OD
- Born: Carl Myrie Abrahams; May 14, 1911; Saint Andrew Parish, Jamaica
- Died: April 10, 2005 (aged 93)
- Years active: 1928–2005
- Awards: Order of Distinction; Gold Musgrave Medal
- Notable work: Thirteen Israelites; Last Supper; Destruction of Port Royal; The Ascension; Woman I Must Be About My Father's Business; Adam and Eve
- Military career
- Allegiance: England
- Branch: Royal Air Force
- Service years: 1944-1947
- Conflicts: World War II

Carl Myrie Abrahams OD (14 May 1911 – 10 April 2005) was a Jamaican painter from Saint Andrew Parish.

== Biography ==
Abrahams was born in St Andrew, Jamaica to a middle class family. Carl's Father was a Jewish émigré from Austria-Hungary who came to the Island in 1906 to work on some of the Island's first motorcars. He began his career in commercial art at the age of 17 as a cartoonist and an illustrator for The Daily Gleaner and the Jamaica Times as well as creating ads for Myers Rum and the Jamaica Biscuit Company.

In 1937, while on a working holiday in Jamaica, Augustus John, the iconic British artist, encouraged Abrahams to begin painting professionally. Abrahams taught himself to paint through self-study courses and manuals and by copying masterpieces from art books.

In 1944, during World War II Abrahams served in the Royal Air Force in England. By the mid-1950s he had found his calling as a painter of religious subjects.

The National Gallery of Jamaica said of his monumental series of 20 paintings of The Passion of Christ that "the devout sentiment of a true believer marked Abrahams as Jamaica and the Caribbean's finest religious painter."

Abrahams was a devout Christian and many of works revolved around religious themes with undeniable authenticity, paintings such as The Last Supper showcase Abrahams ability to add contemporary elements and twists to iconic religious parables.

He was awarded the Musgrave Gold Medal for his work by the Institute of Jamaica in 1987.

His final decades saw few new developments in his style and he often repeated or created variations on many of his earlier paintings. Abrahams described himself as an internationalist and was regarded by others as artistically a "citizen of the world". Abrahams died peacefully at his home in 2005 of cancer and a brain tumor.

== Works ==
- Last Supper
- Destruction of Port Royal
- Woman I Must Be About My Father's Business
- Adam and Eve
- Thirteen Israelites
- The Henry Ford Show
- Pan and His Musicians
- Backyard Preacher
- The Hand of Columbus
- The Ascension
- Hallelujah
- "Afro Jewess"

== Awards ==
- Royal Air Force (RAF) Award
- New York Critics Award
- Silver Musgrave Medal of the Institution of Jamaica
- Order of Distinction (Jamaica)
- Gold Musgrave Medal of The Institution of Jamaica (1987)
