= Annette Mills (academic) =

Professor of information systems in New Zealand

- Awards: Fellow of the Association for Information Systems

Academic background
- Education: University of Waikato, University of Technology, University of the West Indies, University of Otago
- Thesis: Investigating the determinants of user sophistication: a perspective from social cognitive theory (1996)

Annette Marie Mills is a Jamaican–New Zealand academic, and is Professor of Information Systems in the business school at the University of Canterbury, specialising in the impacts of new technologies, especially relating to privacy.

== Academic career ==
Mills completed her undergraduate training at the University of Technology and the University of the West Indies. Mills completed a PhD titled Investigating the determinants of user sophistication: a perspective from social cognitive theory at the University of Waikato in 1996. She also has a postgraduate certificate in tertiary teaching from the University of Otago. Mills is on the faculty of the University of Canterbury, where she is Professor of Information Systems.

Mills is interested in how people and societies adapt to new and emerging technologies, and the positive and negative impacts of those technologies, including privacy concerns. She covers topics such as pervasive data collection, digital surveillance, automated decision-making, wearable technologies, and biometric data. She has also examined how the increase in home-working has affected enterprise security.

Mills is on the committee of the Privacy Foundation New Zealand, and convenes the working group on children's privacy. Mills is an editor for several journals, including and IT & People, the Journal of Global Information Management, and the Australian Journal of Information Systems.

In 2020 Mills was elected a Fellow of the Association for Information Systems. In 1993 she was awarded a Commonwealth Scholarship to New Zealand.

== Selected works ==
- Jenni Mehrtens; Paul B. Cragg; Mills, Annette Marie (2001). "A model of Internet adoption by SMEs". Information & Management. 39 (3): 165–176. doi:10.1016/s0378-7206(01)00086-6. Wikidata Q125164805.
- Mills, Annette Marie; Trevor A. Smith (2011). "Knowledge management and organizational performance: a decomposed view". Journal of Knowledge Management. 15 (1): 156–171. doi:10.1108/13673271111108756. Wikidata Q125306551.
- Lindsay H. Stuart; Mills, Annette Marie; Ulrich Remus (2009). "School leaders, ICT competence and championing innovations". Computers and Education. 53 (3): 733–741. doi:10.1016/j.compedu.2009.04.013. Wikidata Q125164804.
- Luiz Mendes-Filho; Mills, Annette Marie; Tan, Felix; Simon Milne (2017). "Empowering the traveler: an examination of the impact of user-generated content on travel planning". Journal of Travel and Tourism Marketing. 35 (4): 425–436. doi:10.1080/10548408.2017.1358237. Wikidata Q125167557.
- Reza Vaezi; Mills, Annette Marie; Wynne Chin; Humayun Zafar (2016). "User Satisfaction Research in Information Systems: Historical Roots and Approaches". Communications of the Association for Information Systems. 38: 501–532. doi:10.17705/1cais.03827. Wikidata Q125306555.
- Judith Welschen; Nelly Todorova; Mills, Annette Marie (2012). "An Investigation of the Impact of Intrinsic Motivation on Organizational Knowledge Sharing". International Journal of Knowledge Management (in Ndonga). 8 (2): 23–42. doi:10.4018/jkm.2012040102. Wikidata Q125306574.
- Joey F. George; Manjul Gupta; Gabriel Giordano; Mills, Annette Marie; Vanesa M. Tennant; Carmen C. Lewis (2018). "The Effects of Communication Media and Culture on Deception Detection Accuracy". Management Information Systems Quarterly. 42 (2): 551–575. doi:10.25300/misq/2018/13215. Wikidata Q125306559.
