= David Pottinger =

Jamaican artist (1911–2004)

David "Jack" Pottinger (1911–2004) was a Jamaican painter.

Self-taught as an artist, he began his career in the 1940s after participating in Edna Manley's classes at the Junior Centre in Kingston, Jamaica. Kingston was the primary subject of much of his work; he also painted Jamaican traditions and popular scenes. His style has been described as reminiscent of the early paintings of Petion Savain.

Pottinger was awarded a Gold Musgrave Medal in 2002 by the Institute of Jamaica.
