= Camille Chedda =

Jamaican visual artist and academic (born 1985)

- Born: 1985 (age 40–41); Manchester, Jamaica
- Education: Edna Manley College of the Visual and Performing Arts; University of Massachusetts
- Occupations: Visual artist and academic
- Employer(s): Edna Manley College of the Visual and Performing Art
- Awards: Albert Huie Award in Painting, Reed Foundation Scholarship, Dawn Scott Memorial Award
- Website: camillechedda.com

Camille Chedda (born 1985) is a Jamaican visual artist and academic. She attended the Edna Manley College of the Visual and Performing Arts (BFA, Painting, 2007) and the University of Massachusetts, Dartmouth (MFA, 2012). Chedda is a lecturer at the Edna Manley College of the Visual and Performing Art and Project Manager for the InPulse Collective, an artistic and social initiative to support urban Jamaican youth through the practice of visual arts in Kingston.

== Personal life ==
Chedda was born in Manchester, Jamaica and currently lives and works in Kingston, Jamaica.

== Career ==
Chedda's work was included in the travelling exhibition Relational Undercurrents: Contemporary Art of the Caribbean Archipelago (2017–2019), Museum of Latin American Art, Los Angeles, California; The Jamaica Biennial (2017), National Gallery of Jamaica, Kingston; the 4th Ghetto Biennale (2015), Port-Au-Prince, Haiti; and Jamaica Pulse: Art and Politics from Jamaica and the Diaspora (2016), Royal West of England Academy, Bristol, UK.

=== Too Close For Comfort ===
Chedda's work Too Close for Comfort (2016), exhibited in Jamaica Pulse: Art and Politics from Jamaica and the Diaspora, observes gender and sexual taboos, rooted in the psychological trauma of the Middle Passage. The work engaged with themes of identity, class and race that have resulted from the Transatlantic Slave System, focusing on how bodies were stacked together on slave ships as cargo.

=== Rebuild ===
Chedda's work Rebuild, made as part of the 2015 Ghetto Biennale in Port-Au-Prince, Haiti, an installation of cast cement, plastic bags, sequins, plastic toys and objects, rice, printed text and concrete block, explored notions of loss, associated with the 2010 earthquake that destroyed sections of Haiti. Buildings were thought to have been made from substandard concrete blocks and Chedda's work echoed discussion about proliferation of poor materials used in already undermined communities. The work looks at the wider issue of neo-colonial devastation, in part created by state malpractice and the politics of neo-liberal global interference that the Caribbean region and other developing world nations face.

=== Sketch for Exchange Value ===
Chedda's work Sketch for Exchange Value, in the group exhibition Insides (2015) at New Local Space (NLS) in Kingston, Jamaica, exhibited along with work by Oneika Russell, Phillip Thomas and Prudence Lovell, took the methods of drawing beyond its more conventionally recognized use as a preliminary means of generating ideas behind the scene, to highlight the autonomous entity that drawing can be in contemporary art practice. The exhibition touched on subjects such as violence against the black body, distorted connectivity in the digital age, and notions of obscurity and transcendence in the context of displacement. Chedda's installation consisted of portrait renderings on the interior of plastic bags, speaking simultaneously to fragility and dispensability of the subjects depicted therein. She uses the act of drawing as a conceit to question the value ascribed to black lives, their visibility, and the place in society that their deaths occupy.

=== Residencies ===
Chedda has completed residencies at Hospitalfield House in Scotland (2017), Art Omi in New York (2016), and Alice Yard in Trinidad (2014).

== Awards ==
Chedda is the recipient of numerous awards, including the Albert Huie Award in Painting (2007), the Reed Foundation Scholarship (2007), and the inaugural Dawn Scott Memorial Award for an outstanding contribution to the Jamaica Biennial (2014).
