= Lawrence Graham-Brown =

American artist

- Born: Jamaica
- Education: New York University

Lawrence Graham‑Brown is a Jamaican‑American interdisciplinary artist, director, and performer based in New York / New Jersey. His artistic work engages with themes of religion, sexuality, race, ritual, and memory, often within sacred or ritualized spaces.

== Biography ==
Born in Jamaica, Graham-Brown later relocated to the United States. He identifies as openly gay, and much of his artistic practice centers on confronting homophobia, especially within religious and diasporic contexts. His performance and visual works are known for their symbolic use of Afro-Caribbean spiritual elements, homoerotic imagery, and reappropriation of sacred rituals to interrogate systems of oppression.

His work has been presented at the Queens Museum, El Museo del Barrio, Leslie-Lohman Museum ofArt, National Gallery of Jamaica and the Shanghai Bienniale.

Lawrence has been the recipient of the Juror's Award and Prize at NYU Small Works International Exhibition, and was a Franklin Furnace Fellow for Avant‑Garde performance art in 2011–2012.
