= Hope Brooks =

Jamaican painter

Hope Brooks (born 1944 in Kingston, Jamaica) is a Jamaican painter. Many of her works consist of multiple panels, and are designed to be exhibited installation-style. Her works are mainly abstract, but many contain political themes as well.

Brooks studied at the Edinburgh College of Art from 1963 to 1967, and at the Maryland Institute College of Art from 1980 to 1981. Her work may be seen at the National Gallery of Jamaica, and has been shown in many exhibits of Jamaican art.

Brooks was a professor at the Jamaica School of Art (now part of the Edna Manley College of the Visual and Performing Arts) before becoming director of the painting department. She later served as vice principal of academic and technical studies at Edna Manley College.

Brooks has had many local and international exhibitions. Notably, showing at the Mutual Gallery in Kingston, and at Grand Valley State University, Michigan, USA. Her work is featured in many public and private collections around the world.

Brook's career was recognized by the Institute of Jamaica with both the Centenary Medal in 1980 and the Silver Musgrave Medal in 1995.

She currently resides in St Andrew, Jamaica.
