= Lloyd Carney =

American businessman (born 1962)

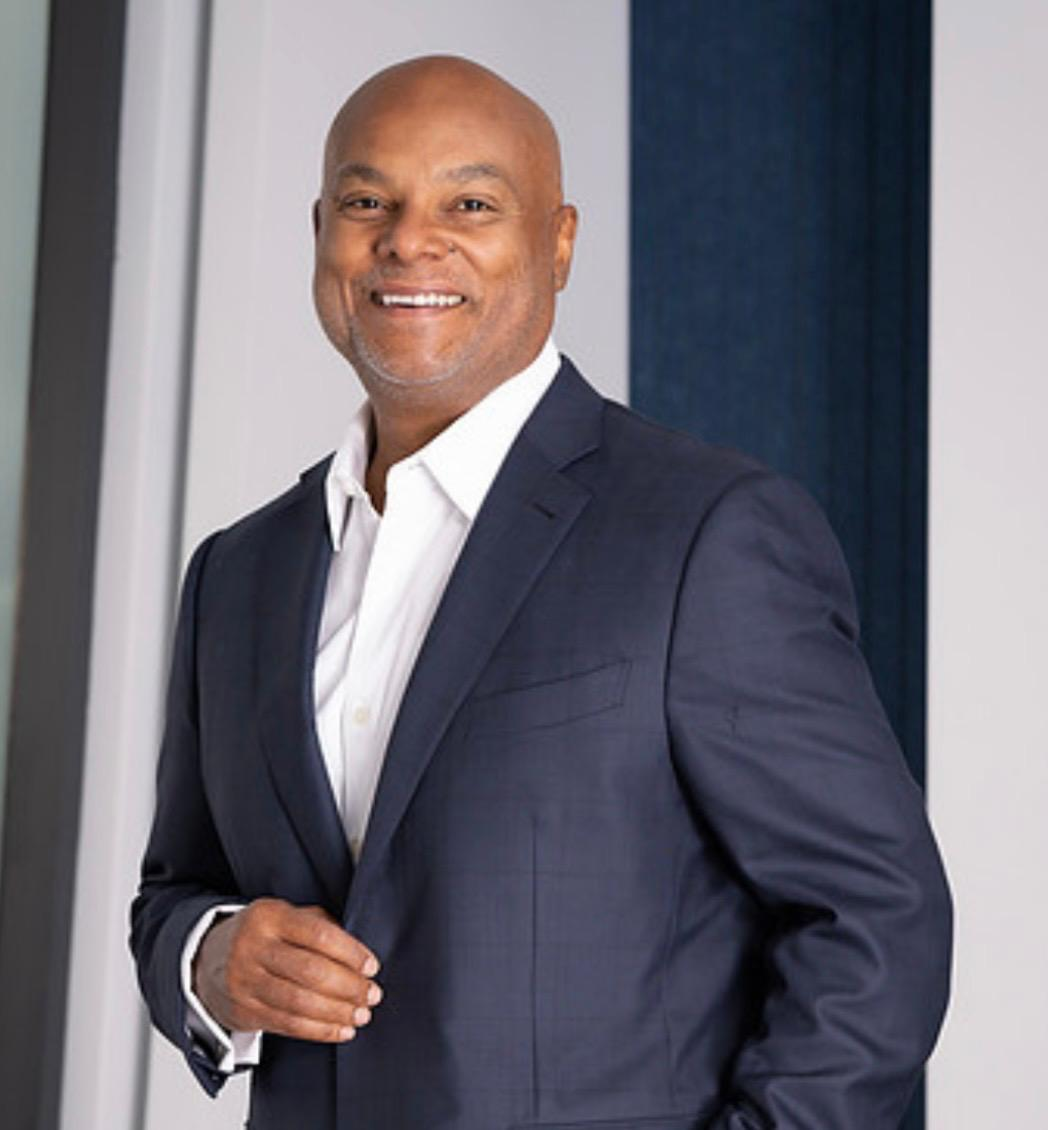
- Born: 1962 (age 63–64); Kingston, Jamaica
- Citizenship: United States
- Education: Wentworth Institute of Technology; Lesley University
- Occupation: Business executive
- Title: Chairman and CEO of Carney Global Ventures; Chancellor of University of Technology, Jamaica
- Board member of: Visa Inc.; Vertex Pharmaceuticals; Grid Dynamics (Chairman)
- Children: 3
- Website: carneyglobalventures.com

Lloyd Carney (born 1962) is an American businessman who lives in the San Francisco Bay Area. He is the former chief executive officer and a member of the board of directors of Brocade Communications Systems, leaving that position when Brocade was acquired by Broadcom Limited in 2017.

He has also held senior leadership roles at IBM and Juniper Networks.

Carney serves as Chancellor of the University of Technology, Jamaica.

He is Chairman and Chief Executive Officer of Carney Global Ventures.

He serves on the board of Vertex Pharmaceuticals.

== Early life ==
Carney was born in Kingston, Jamaica. He attended Wolmer's Boys' School, one of the oldest high schools in the Caribbean, before relocating to the United States to pursue higher education.

== Education ==
Lloyd Carney earned a Bachelor of Science in Electrical Engineering Technology from the Wentworth Institute of Technology and a Master of Science in Applied Business Management from Lesley University (formerly Lesley College).

=== Honorary degrees ===
In 2013, Carney was awarded an honorary PhD in Engineering by the Wentworth Institute of Technology, where he also delivered the August 2013 commencement keynote address.

In 2022, he received an honorary Doctor of Engineering degree from the University of Technology, Jamaica.

Carney has served multiple terms on the Board of Trustees of the Wentworth Institute of Technology. He has also contributed to campus development by funding resources such as the Lloyd Carney Reading Room and the Tech Sandbox, initiatives aimed at supporting student innovation and entrepreneurship.

== Career ==
=== Early career ===
Carney began his career in the technology and networking sector at Wellfleet Communications. The company later merged with SynOptics to form Bay Networks, which was subsequently acquired by Nortel Networks in 1998.

=== Juniper Networks (2002–2003) ===
In 2002, Carney joined Juniper Networks as Chief Operating Officer, where he oversaw engineering, product management, and manufacturing.

=== Micromuse and IBM (2003–2008) ===
Carney later became Chairman and Chief Executive Officer of Micromuse, a network management software company. Micromuse was acquired by IBM in 2006.

=== Xsigo Systems (2008–2012) ===
In 2008, Carney became Chief Executive Officer of Xsigo Systems, a data center virtualization company. Xsigo was acquired by Oracle Corporation in 2012.

=== Brocade Communications Systems (2013–2017) ===
Carney was Chief Executive Officer and Director of Brocade Communications Systems from 2013 to 2017. During his tenure, the company expanded its position in data center and storage networking. Brocade was acquired by Broadcom Inc. in 2017.

=== Grid Dynamics ===
Carney serves as Chairman of the Board of Grid Dynamics, a digital transformation and technology consulting company. In 2020, the company became publicly traded following a business combination with ChaSerg Technology Acquisition Corp.

=== Tryall Golf Club ===
Carney has been president of the Tryall Golf Club in Jamaica.

== Board memberships ==
=== Corporate boards ===
Carney has served on the boards of several publicly traded companies in the technology and life sciences sectors. He joined the Board of Directors of Visa Inc. in 2015 and serves as Chair of the Audit and Risk Committee. He was appointed to the Board of Directors of Vertex Pharmaceuticals in 2019, where he serves as Chair of the Corporate Governance and Nominating Committee.

Carney is Chairman of Grid Dynamics, a digital transformation and technology consulting company. He previously was Chairman of Nuance Communications, having been appointed in 2018. Carney also was on the Board of Directors of Technicolor, and of Cypress Semiconductor from 2005 to 2014.

=== Nonprofit and advisory roles ===
Outside the corporate sector, Carney has held advisory and nonprofit leadership roles. He has served on the Executive Council of UCSF Health and as a trustee of the Wentworth Institute of Technology.

Carney has also served on the Advisory Council of the Boys & Girls Clubs of the Peninsula, a community-based youth development organization in California’s Bay Area.

He has participated in Silicon Valley Start-up Common (SVSC), where he has mentored early-stage founders and supported entrepreneurship initiatives.

== Public service and academic leadership ==
In August 2022, Carney was appointed Chancellor of the University of Technology, Jamaica. In this role, he has supported initiatives in science, technology, engineering, and innovation and has advocated for the development of Jamaica’s talent pipeline in STEM fields.

In May 2023, the Government of Jamaica named Carney its Ambassador for Technology (also referred to as Special Investment Envoy for Technology). The role focuses on attracting technology investment, strengthening digital infrastructure, and supporting the development of Jamaica’s technology sector.

== Philanthropy ==
Carney is the founder of the Lloyd Carney Foundation, a nonprofit organization focused on education, health, and community initiatives.

The foundation has supported initiatives in multiple countries, including Jamaica, Haiti, South Africa, and the United States.

The foundation has contributed medical equipment to Jamaican hospitals, including cranial imaging equipment for the University Hospital of the West Indies, and has supported the Black River Hospital in Saint Elizabeth Parish.

In 2024, students at the University of Technology, Jamaica received scholarships funded by Carney Global Ventures and the Lloyd Carney Foundation.

The Lloyd Carney Foundation also funded the establishment of the IMEK Laboratory at the University of Technology, Jamaica, a makerspace focused on innovation, manufacturing, engineering, and knowledge development.

The facility is designed to support students in developing practical solutions in science, technology, engineering, and manufacturing, and includes advanced equipment such as 3D printing technology.

== Honors and awards ==
In May 2025, Carney was ranked No. 73 on the inaugural The Wall Street Journal list of the "Top 250 Most Influential and Effective Corporate Directors" serving on S&P 500 boards.

Carney was also recognized by the National Association of Corporate Directors (NACD) as part of its "Directorship 100," which honors individuals in corporate governance.

In October 2025, Carney was awarded the national honour of Commander in the Order of Distinction (CD) by the Government of Jamaica for his contributions to academia and philanthropy.

== Media coverage ==
Carney has been featured in several publications. A 2012 profile in Forbes discussed his career and leadership in the technology sector. In 2016, The New York Times featured Carney in its "Corner Office" series, focusing on his leadership philosophy.

Business Insider also profiled Carney in 2016, discussing his leadership approach and early influences.

== Personal life ==
Carney divides his time between the San Francisco Bay Area and Montego Bay, Jamaica, where he owns a working farm.

He has three children and two grandchildren.
