= University of Technology, Jamaica =

Public university in Jamaica

Coordinates: 18.0182219°N 76.7440832°W

- Other name: UTech
- Motto: Latin: Magna per atem gesta
- Motto in English: "Excellence Through Knowledge"
- Type: Public
- Established: 1958; 68 years ago
- Chancellor: Lloyd Carney
- President: Kevin Brown
- Students: 12,000+
- Location: Kingston, Jamaica
- Campus: Papine Campus (Main), Montego Bay Campus (Western)
- Language: English
- Colors: Navy blue, white and gold
- Website: utech.edu.jm

The University of Technology, Jamaica (UTech, Ja.), formerly the College of Arts, Science and Technology, is a public university in Jamaica.

== History ==
The university was founded as the Jamaica Institute of Technology in 1958. The following year it was incorporated as the College of Arts, Science and Technology (CAST), and was formally recognised by an Act of Parliament in 1964. It was granted degree awarding powers in 1986 and a governing council and academic board were established. The college gained university status, under its current name, on 1 September 1995, and permanent provision for the university was made by the University of Technology, Jamaica Act 27, which became law on 29 June 1999.

From just over 50 students and four programmes in 1958, UTech, Ja has grown to become one of the top tertiary education institutions in Jamaica, with a student population of over 12,000. It now offers more than 90 programmes at the certificate, diploma and degree levels through its five faculties and three colleges.

== Academics ==
The University of Technology offers courses across eight colleges and faculties:

- College of Business & Management (COBAM)
- College of Health Sciences (COHS)
- Faculty of Education & Liberal Studies (FELS)
- Faculty of Engineering & Computing (FENC)
- Faculty of Law (FOL)
- Faculty of Science & Sport (FOSS)
- Faculty of The Built Environment (FOBE)
- Joint Colleges of Medicine, Oral Health & Veterinary Sciences

Degrees of the university are either currently accredited or have been granted Candidacy for Accreditation status by the University Council of Jamaica. BArch and MArch degrees are additionally accredited by the Commonwealth Association of Architects.

== Campuses ==
The University of Technology, Jamaica currently has four campuses:

- Papine Campus
- Slipe Pen Road Campus
- Arthur Wint Drive Campus
- Western Campus

== Programmes ==
This institution offers over 100 programmes in various colleges and faculties. These are the College of Business and Management, the College of Health Sciences, the Colleges of Oral Health Sciences, the Faculty of the Built Environment, the Faculty of Science and Sport, the Faculty of Engineering and Computing, the Faculty of Education and Liberal Studies, and the Faculty of Law. The UTech Academy offers pre-university and all pre-graduate courses and programmes.

Courses are offered at the certificate, diploma, undergraduate, and post-graduate degree levels.

=== College of Business and Management ===
The College of Business and Management comprises the Schools of Business Administration and Hospitality and Tourism Management, the Joan Duncan School of Ethics, Entrepreneurship and Leadership, and the UTech/JIM School of Advanced Management.

=== College of Health Sciences ===
Comprises the School of Allied Health and Wellness, Caribbean School of Nursing, the School of Pharmacy, School of Public Health and Health Technology and the Institute of Health and Medical Sciences.

=== Faculty of Science and Sport ===
Consists of the School of Natural and Applied Sciences, School of Mathematics and Statistics, Caribbean School of Sport Sciences and Centre of Science-based Research, Entrepreneurship and Continuing Studies.

=== Faculty of the Built Environment ===
Consists of the School of Building and Land Management and the Caribbean School of Architecture, the only architectural school in the English-speaking Caribbean.

=== Faculty of Engineering and Computing ===
The Schools of Computing and Information Technology and Engineering fall within the Faculty of Engineering and Computing.

=== Faculty of Education and Liberal Studies ===
Contains the programmes of the School of Humanities and Social Sciences and the School of Technical and Vocational Education.

== List of Chancellors ==
- 1999–2010: Bill Morris
- 2010–2019: Edward Seaga
- 2022–present: Lloyd Carney

== List of Presidents ==
=== Principals and Presidents of CAST ===
- 1958–1959: Alistair Thompson (acting)
- 1959–1965: Hugh Faulkner
- 1965–1969: Cecile Wint
- 1969–1970: B. E. Towlson (acting)
- 1970–1995: Alfred Sangster (Principal, 1970–1986; President, 1986–1995)

=== Presidents of UTech ===
- 1995–1996: Alfred Sangster
- 1996–2007: Rae Davis
- 2007–2014: Errol Morrison
- 2014–2015: Burchell Whiteman (acting)
- 2015–2016: Colin Gyles (acting)
- 2017–2020: Stephen Vasciannie
- 2020–2023: Colin Gyles (acting)
- 2023–present: Kevin Brown

== Notable alumni ==
- Usain Bolt, retired sprinter and world record holder in the 100 metres, 200 metres and 4 × 100 metres relay
- Shelly-Ann Fraser-Pryce, sprinter
- Annette Mills, professor of information systems at the University of Canterbury
- Sean Paul, rapper, singer, and songwriter
- Asafa Powell, sprinter
- Delroy Slowley, politician
- Elaine Thompson-Herah, sprinter
