= Mallica Reynolds =

Bp The Honourable Kapo OD
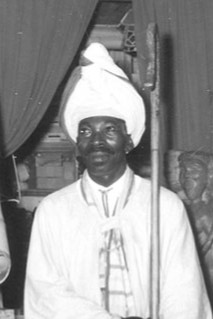
- Kapo at the Hills Galleries in Kingston, Jamaica, 1957
- Born: Mallica Reynolds; 10 February 1911; Saint Catherine Parish, Colony of Jamaica, British Empire
- Died: 24 February 1989 (aged 78)
- Resting place: National Heroes Park
- Known for: Painting, sculpture
- Movement: Intuitives

Mallica Reynolds, OD (10 February 1911 – 24 February 1989), better known by the adopted name "Kapo", was a Jamaican artist and religious leader. Considered one of the greatest artists in Jamaica's "Intuitives" artistic movement, Kapo's religious beliefs were reflected in his work.

== Biography ==
Mallica Reynolds was born in Byndloss, Saint Catherine Parish, Jamaica on 10 February 1911. At the age of 12, Reynolds had a religious experience and began going by the name "Kapo". At age 16, he received a vision and became a preacher. He later moved to Kingston, where he founded a Zion Revival church, St. Michael's Revival Apostolic Tabernacle. Kapo was a leader in the Zion Revival movement, and from 1976 until his death, was the patriarch Bishop of St. Michael's Revival Apostolic Tabernacle.

He began creating paintings in the 1940s, and he rose to national and international acclaim in the 1960s. Edward Seaga, a powerful politician who would go on to head the Jamaica Labour Party and later become the Prime Minister of Jamaica, and John Pringle, a founding figure in the Jamaican tourism industry, were both champions of Kapo's work. The latter collected Kapo's work, and donated his collection to the National Gallery of Jamaica upon his death. Roberta Flack, an American musician, was one of Kapo's patrons, and his portrait of her is now held by the American Folk Art Museum. His works have been exhibited internationally, including six exhibitions in the United States between 1953 and 1982.

Heavily influenced by his religious beliefs, Kapo believed that he was tasked by god to create paintings and sculptures. Dr. Veerle Poupeye, the Executive Director of the National Gallery of Jamaica, wrote that "Kapo's paintings and sculptures, as a whole, depict his Zion Revival life world". Poupeye noted that several of Kapo's works depicted Zion Revival ceremonies, music, and dance. Kapo is considered a member of the "Intuitives" artistic movement; a label propagated by the National Gallery of Jamaica to describe self-taught artists that had previously been referred to as "Jamaican Primitives". He is considered one of the movement's greatest artists.

Kapo died on 24 February 1989, and was buried in National Heroes Park.

== Honors ==
One of Kapo's paintings, "Shining the Spring", was selected by the Jamaican government as a wedding gift for the 1981 Wedding of Prince Charles and Lady Diana. In 1983, Kapo became the first artist to have a gallery exclusively of his work featured in an exhibition at the National Gallery of Jamaica. He has been named to the Order of Distinction, and awarded the Norman Manley Award for Excellence in the Arts. He was also awarded the Musgrave Gold Medal in 1985 by the Institute of Jamaica.
