= Graham Roger Serjeant =

British medical researcher (1938–2025)

Graham Roger Serjeant CMG (26 October 1938 – 25 March 2025) was a British medical researcher who studied sickle-cell disease in Jamaica, setting up screening programmes and a cohort study from birth. He directed the MRC Laboratories at the University of the West Indies and instituted the Sickle Cell Trust (Jamaica), a local charity. He has written four books and approximately 500 papers on sickle-cell disease. His work addressed the variability of sickle-cell disease with special emphasis on developing low-cost models of management suitable to countries with large numbers of patients and limited resources.

== Early life and education ==
Graham Serjeant was born in Bristol on 26 October 1938 to Ewart and Violet Serjeant, the middle of three boys born five years apart.

At about 18 months of age, his family moved to Hove in Sussex and he attended the local primary school between the ages of five and 10, then entered the Quaker boarding school at Sibford Ferris in Oxfordshire. In those days, school ended at the 5th form and after passing 11 subjects at O-level, he moved to another Quaker boarding school, Bootham in York. Here he studied botany, zoology, physics and chemistry at A-level but set his sights on attending Cambridge. He was successful and proceeded to the entrance examinations at Cambridge where, following an interview with Sir Henry Thirkill, master of Clare College, he was offered a place to study the Natural Science Tripos in September 1957.

In the long vacation of 1959, he worked as a research assistant at the Pepper Clinical Laboratory at the University of Pennsylvania and then travelled 9,000 miles around the United States. In the next long vacation, he travelled across Europe to Greece, slept on the deck of a boat to Alexandria, Egypt before travelling the length of the White Nile to Uganda, spending 3 months hitch-hiking around Uganda, Kenya and Tanzania. After returning to the United Kingdom and clinical studies at the London Hospital in Whitechapel in September 1960, he sought an opportunity to return to Uganda for four months clinical training in paediatrics under Professor Derrick Jelliffe. He was the only student at that time to request an elective period abroad whereas this has now become a routine part of medical education. This experience proved vital in later decisions to work on sickle-cell disease in Jamaica.

After completing the Medical Tripos examinations in Cambridge in June 1963, he returned to the London Hospital for house jobs with the Surgical Unit and Paediatrics (1963–64) and then to the Royal United Hospital in Bath (1964–65) where he completed a six-month assignment in General Medicine and one year in Neurology before returning to London as senior house officer to Professor John Goodwin in cardiology at the Royal Postgraduate Medical School, Hammersmith. While in Bath, he met his future wife Beryl Elizabeth King, a medical technologist, and they were married in March 1965. After Hammersmith and passing the Membership of the Royal College of Physicians of London (MRCP), he sought work abroad in sub-Saharan Africa, but in the absence of suitable posts, he was persuaded by Beryl, who had spent some of her childhood in Bermuda, to apply to the Department of Medicine at the University of the West Indies (UWI), Kingston, Jamaica, where he was appointed by Professor Eric Cruickshank.

== Life in Jamaica ==
In August, they set sail from Portsmouth on the SS Golfito for the 12-day journey to Trinidad and then Jamaica. For a year, he worked in the Department of Medicine with ward rounds and busy outpatient clinics but was soon asked to assist in the sickle-cell clinic recently formed by Dr. Paul Milner of the Sub-Department of Haematology. That clinic saw many patients with the generally severe form of sickle cell disease, HbSS, aged over 30 years, which contrasted with descriptions in contemporary medical text books of a disease where few survived childhood. This led to the hypothesis that either the disease in Jamaica was different or that a strong symptomatic bias had resulted because reports, principally from the US, were based on sick patients attending clinics and hospitals. The hypothesis that standard medical concepts of the disease were heavily biased towards hospital-based patients attracted the interest of Dr. Peter Williams, then secretary of the Wellcome Trust, resulting in Wellcome Trust support to Dr. Paul Milner, Dr. Graham Serjeant and Beryl over the next four years (1967–71). The grant provided a Volkswagen minibus which functioned as a mobile clinic and extensive travels over Jamaica following up patients long lost to the Clinic and the University Hospital showed that many were well and had actually improved with age. This observation changed the whole concepts of sickle-cell disease, confirmed the role of symptomatic selection and made the case for studies of the true natural history based on newborn detection of the disease.

After 3 months at the University of Memphis, the home of Dr. Lemuel Diggs, a veteran pathologist working in sickle cell disease, Dr. Serjeant returned to Cambridge to work with Professor Hermann Lehmann at the Medical Research Council (MRC) Abnormal Haemoglobin Unit in September 1971. Intending to spend 3 years and complete a PhD on haemoglobin structure, he sat in a laboratory with 10–12 other workers, and it was clear that the wrong decision had been made to study in a laboratory in Cambridge when the clinical studies in Jamaica had ceased. After three months, and with support from the British Medical Research Council, it was decided to leave Cambridge after one year and return to Jamaica and initiate a cohort study of sickle-cell disease from birth. Appointed to the staff of the MRC Epidemiology Research Unit at UWI in November 1972, the ground work was laid for newborn screening of sickle cell disease made possible by the expertise of Beryl who adapted methods for the diagnosis of the disease on samples taken from the umbilical cord. In August 1974, the name of the Unit was changed to the MRC Laboratories, and he was appointed Director of the Unit until his retirement in September 1999.

== The Jamaican cohort study ==
Once the diagnostic methods were perfected (this at a time when the rest of the world believed that it was not possible to diagnose the disease at birth), screening of births at Victoria Jubilee Hospital, the main Government Maternity Hospital in Kingston, commenced on 25 June 1973 and continued until 28 December 1981 for a total of 100,000 consecutive births. All 550 cases of sickle-cell disease were identified, and along with 250 normal matched controls, have now been followed for up to 48 years. Thanks to the advantages of an island and a cooperative population, virtually all surviving cases of the disease continue to be monitored, and the study has told the world much about sickle-cell disease.

The cohort study provided unique opportunities for studying every aspect of the disease, and the staff gradually grew to 28, including doctors, medical technologists, nurses, statisticians, computer staff, social workers and counsellors. The 800 children in the Cohort have now been followed for periods up to 48 years, documenting the development of haematological change, principal clinical features and causes of death with the production of 139 papers in the medical literature. Of the 311 subjects with HbSS, 136 have died, 82 emigrated, and 93 are alive and resident in Jamaica, the 100% follow-up after 48 years being testimony to the suitability of Jamaica for long-term studies of disease. The Unit was also fortunate in attracting many visiting workers such as Professor Alan Bird from Moorfields Eye Hospital in London, who for 20 years, led a team of ophthalmologists to document the evolution of retinal disease. Support in the US also allowed three studies on the role of laser treatment in eye complications. Other close collaborators included Professor David Weatherall and Professor Douglas Higgs of the Weatherall Institute of Molecular Medicine, Oxford, Dr. George Dover of Johns Hopkins Hospital, Baltimore, and Professor Andreas Kulozik of the University of Heidelberg, Germany. The requirements of the staff and the research programmes now outstripped the facilities inherited from the previous MRC Unit and further developments were needed.

== Sickle Cell Trust (Jamaica) ==
Established as a locally registered charity in 1986, the Trust assisted in the development of research and sickle-cell services. The acquisition of a diagnostic ultrasound instrument was followed by construction of a dedicated Sickle Cell Clinic in 1988 and an Education Centre for Sickle Cell Disease in 1994. From 2000, the Trust embarked on an education program delivering illustrated Powerpoint lectures to almost all the island's 160 secondary schools and with the development of electronic media, these lectures were professionally recorded and given to all schools on either tape or DVD. Following these lectures, the dominant question was where could the students learn their haemoglobin genotype and whether they were at risk of a child with sickle cell disease.

== The Manchester Project ==
This issue was addressed in the https://www.jamaicaobserver.com/News/The-Manchester-Project---screening-for-sickle-cell--one-baby-at-a-time which, in collaboration with the local Ministry of Health and Ministry of Education, offered free haemoglobin genotype identification to senior classes of 14 secondary schools in the parish of Manchester in central Jamaica. Over six years (2007–2013), a total of 16,612 students, mostly aged 15-19 years, were screened and given genotype cards, and the 2,417 carriers of abnormal genes were offered counselling. To determine whether this information influenced reproductive decisions, newborn screening was established in 13 hospitals in the south and west of Jamaica where mothers were most likely to have their babies. Subsequent analysis found 2,442 deliveries to mothers screened at school, of which 11 babies had forms of sickle cell disease, which did not deviate from expected numbers. Preliminary results suggested that knowledge of genotype in this population had not influenced reproductive decisions.

== Worldwide influence of Jamaican work ==
The expertise gained in the management of 5,500 patients with sickle cell disease as well as the 800 followed from birth in the cohort study has led to many invitations to share Jamaican experience in Brazil, Greece, Nigeria, Uganda, Angola, Cameroon, Congo Brazzaville, Bahrain, Saudi Arabia and India. Foremost among these were 27 visits to India over the last 36 years, where Indian colleagues have found Jamaican experience especially valuable in organizing services for the huge numbers of patients affected across central India.

In 1995 he was awarded the Musgrave Gold Medal by the Institute of Jamaica and in March 2014 received the Humanitarian Award from the Sickle Cell/Thalassemia Patients Network (SCTPN) in New York. The work was recognized by the British Government with the award of the Companion of the Order of St Michael and St George (CMG) in the 1981 Birthday Honours and by the Jamaican Government by the award of the CD (Order of Distinction, Commander Class) in 1995 and of the OJ (Order of Jamaica) in 2015. He received the Mérite Congolaise from Congo Brazzaville in 2005.

== Death ==
Serjeant died on 25 March 2025, at the age of 86.

== Books ==
- The Clinical Features of Sickle Cell Disease, North-Holland, 1974, ISBN 0720473047
- Sickle Cell Disease, Oxford University Press, 1992, ISBN 978-0-19-263036-0
- A Guide to Sickle Cell Disease, Creative Links, 2001, ISBN 9766103925
- Sickle Cell: Jamaica and Beyond - A Life, Ian Randle Publishers, 2021, ISBN 9768286296
