= Edna Manley College of the Visual and Performing Arts =

Art college in Kingston, Jamaica

- Former names: Jamaica School of Art and Crafts
- Established: 1995; 31 years ago
- Chairman: Melanie Subratie
- Principal: Nicholeen DeGrasse-Johnson
- Location: 1, 5 Arthur Wint Drive, Kingston, Jamaica; 17.9982°N 76.7814°W
- Website: www.emc.edu.jm

Edna Manley College of the Visual and Performing Arts, (formerly Jamaica School of Art and Crafts), is an art school in Kingston, Jamaica. In 1940, Edna Manley pioneered evening art classes at the Institute of Jamaica's Junior Centre but it was not until 1950 that the first formal arts school opened at the DaCosta Institute at 1 Central Avenue, Kingston Gardens. A number of leading Jamaican artists collaborated with Manley to open the first art school in Jamaica, including Albert Huie who became one of the tutors. 64 paying students enrolled in the first year and due to unexpected interest expanded the school at 11 North Street.

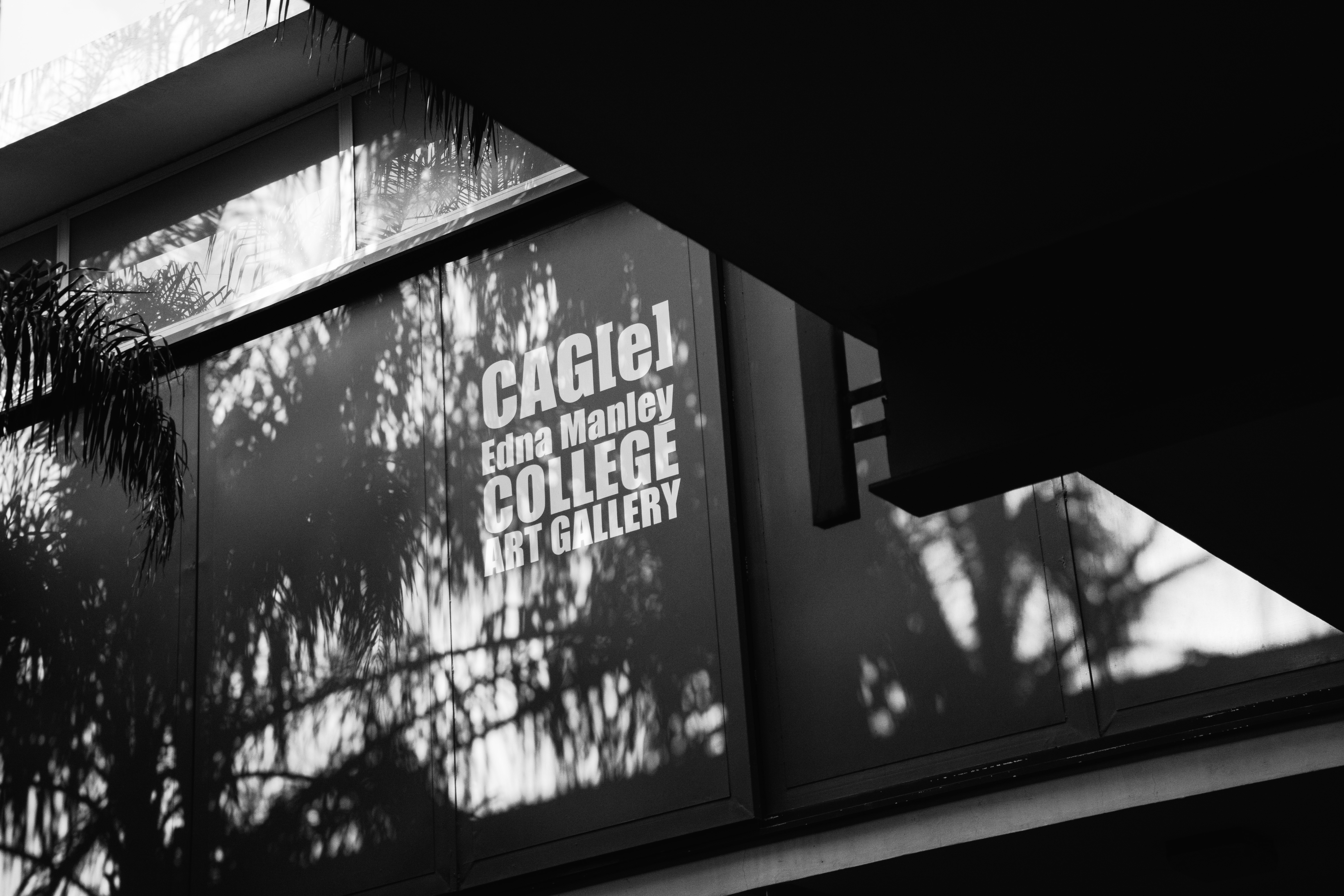
Cage Gallery at Edna Manley College of the Visual and Performing Arts

== History ==
Barrington Watson established a four-year diploma curriculum to the teaching of art when the country gained independence in 1962. By 1964-65 the college had 86 full-time and 84 part-time students. After being renamed in 1967 to the Jamaica School of Art, in 1976 the school was incorporated into the Cultural Training Centre and moved to its new facilities at 1 Arthur Wint Drive, expanding its scope to include art, music, dance, and drama governed by the Institute of Jamaica under the Ministry of Culture.

In 1977, Edna Manley and her son, Jamaican Prime Minister the Most Honourable Michael Manley toured and dedicated the school.

In 1987, Edna Manley died and it was later officially designated a college in 1995, renamed as the Edna Manley College of the Visual and Performing Arts. In September 2004, the School of Visual Arts launched its degree program and today offers Bachelor of Fine Arts (BFA) and a Bachelor of Art Education (BAE) degrees and a BA degree course offered jointly with the University of the West Indies. There is also a Continuing Education division that offers part-time courses.

=== Other information ===
Jamaican music artist and deejay Beenie Man filmed part of the video for his single "Nuff Gal" on the school campus in 1996.

== Faculties ==
The College consists of the following faculties:

- The School of Visual Arts
- The School of Music
- The School of Dance
- The School of Drama
- The School of Arts Management
- The School of Continuing Education and Allied Programmes

== Notable alumni ==
- Camille Chedda, Jamaican visual artist and academic.
- Pearle Christian, Dominican music educator, composer, choral music director, and cultural worker.
- Heather Doram, Antiguan artist and educator, who designed the national costume of Antigua and Barbuda.
- Laura Facey, Jamaican contemporary artist.
- Spice, Jamaican dancehall deejay and singer. Known as the Queen of Dancehall.
- Donnette Zacca, Jamaican fine art photographer, lecturer, and artist.

== See also ==
- Edna Manley
