= Musgrave Medal =

Annual award by the Institute of Jamaica

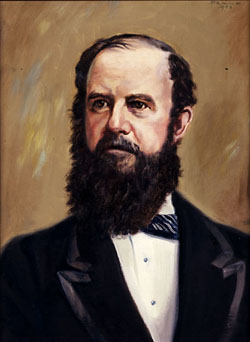
Sir Anthony Musgrave

The Musgrave Medal is an annual award by the Institute of Jamaica in recognition of achievement in art, science, and literature. Originally conceived in 1889 and named in memory of Sir Anthony Musgrave, the founder of the Institute and the former Governor of Jamaica who had died the previous year, the medal was the first to be awarded in the Western Hemisphere.

The medals were initially awarded as prizes in a cultural competition. In 1941, the Gold Medal was initiated and awarded in recognition of a "distinguished eminence". The first recipient of the gold medal was artist Edna Manley in recognition of her work promoting art and literature. A Silver Medal, recognizing "outstanding merit", and Bronze Medal, for merit, are also awarded.

The medal was designed by British sculptor Alfred Toft. The first medal was awarded in 1897, as part of Jamaica's celebrations of Queen Victoria's Diamond Jubilee. Until 1906 the medals were only given as prizes in art and craft competitions organised by the Institute.

In 2011, eight Musgrave Medals were awarded, with a gold medal for Hedley Jones, designer and builder of Jamaica's first solid body electric guitar in 1940, and builder of audio equipment including some of Jamaica's early sound systems and much of the equipment in Studio One.

== Gold Medal winners ==
- 1941: Edna Manley, art and literature (first award)
- 1942: No gold medal awarded
- 1943: Ena Ada Josephine, art and literature
- 1944–50: No gold medals awarded
- 1951: George Goode, music
- 1952–53: No gold medals awarded
- 1954: W. Adolphe Roberts, history literature
- 1955–57: No gold medals awarded
- 1958: J. E. Clare McFarlane, poetry
- 1959–64: No gold medals awarded
- 1965: Theodore E. Sealy, cultural development
- 1966: Phillip Sherlock, history and literature
- 1967: No gold medal awarded
- 1968: Roger Mais, literature, posthumously
- 1969: Ansel Hart, history
- 1970: Alvin Marriott, sculpture
- 1971: Amy Jacques Garvey, history
- 1972: M. G. Smith, anthropology
- 1973: No gold medal awarded
- 1974: Nicolás Guillén, literature; Albert Huie, art
- 1975: Little Theatre Movement, theatre
- 1976: Victor Stafford Reid, literature
- 1977: Alicia Alonso, artistic excellence; Ronald Moody, sculpture
- 1978: Louise Bennett, poetry and theatre
- 1979: No gold medal awarded
- 1980: George Proctor, botany
- 1981: Rex Nettleford, dance and West Indian cultural development
- 1982: Clinton Black, history (archival development)
- 1983: Frederic G. Cassidy, philology and etymology
- 1984: Cecil A. Baugh, ceramics
- 1985: Mallica 'Kapo' Reynolds, painting and sculpture
- 1986: Derek Walcott, literature; Kenneth E.N. Ingram, librarianship and history scholarship
- 1987: Olive Lewin, music; Carl Abrahams, art; Francis Nicholas, dance
- 1988: Alfred Sangster, science and technical education; Trevor Rhone, drama; Clive Thompson, dance
- 1989–92: Osmond Watson, art; Barry Higman, history; Gerald Lalor, science: Robert Hill, history
- 1993: No gold medal awarded
- 1994: Peter Abrahams, fiction and journalism; Manley West, pharmacology
- 1995: David Boxer, art through institution building and scholarship; Graham Roger Serjeant, medical science; John Golding, medical science
- 1996: Sir Roy Augier, Caribbean education history; Stuart Hall, sociological studies
- 1997: No gold medal awarded
- 1998: Jamaica Library Service, literature; University of the West Indies
- 1999: Erna Brodber, literature; Errol Morrison, medical science; Lorna Goodison, poetry
- 2000: Monty Alexander, music; Basil Barrington Watson, art; University Singers, music
- 2001: Hon. Lawson Douglas, urology
- 2002: David Pottinger, art; Clement Seymore 'Sir Coxsone' Dodd, music
- 2003: Chris Blackwell, development of Jamaican music; Franklyn Prendergast, medicine
- 2004: Olive Senior, documenting Jamaican heritage; Mico College, recognizing the importance of Jamaican culture
- 2005: Richard Hart, history
- 2006: Kamau Brathwaite, literature
- 2007: Mystic Revelation of Rastafari, development of Jamaican music; Bertram Fraser-Reid, chemistry
- 2008: Carey Robinson, community development & heritage; Mercedes Richards, astronomy
- 2009: Wycliffe Bennett, arts development; Maureen Warner-Lewis, literature
- 2010: Terrence Forrester, science
- 2011: Hedley Jones, music and audio engineering
- 2012: Horace Fletcher, medical science; Edward Baugh, literature
- 2013: Lee "Scratch" Perry, music; Franklin W. Knight, social history
- 2014: Anthony C. Winkler, literature; Petrona Morrison, education; Celia Christie-Samuels, medical research
- 2015: Sly and Robbie, music; Orlando Patterson, literature
- 2016: No medals awarded
- 2017: Herbert Ho Ping Kong, science
- 2018: Peter Ashbourne, music; Basil Burke, science; Mervyn Morris, literature
- 2019: Michael Bucknor, academia; Winston Ewart, music
- 2021: Ishion Hutchinson, literature, Mona Webber, science, Steven Woodham, music;
- 2022: Lenford Salmon, theater and culture; Joy Spence, chemist and master blender; Diana McCaulay, author and environmental activist
- 2023: Vivian Crawford, arts and culture; Professor Marcia Roye, science and education; Professor Carolyn Cooper, expert in international and Jamaican popular culture
