= Wynne Chin =

American business academic (born c. 1960)

Wynne W. Chin (born c. 1960) is C. T. Bauer Professor of Decision and Information Sciences at the University of Houston (C. T. Bauer College of Business). He received his Ph.D. In computers and information systems and an MBA from the University of Michigan, an MS in chemical and biomedical engineering from Northwestern University, and an AB in biophysics with a minor in philosophy from UC Berkeley. Before joining the University of Houston faculty in 1997, Wynne taught at the University of Calgary and Wayne State University. In addition, he holds visiting status at the School of Information Systems, Technology and Management at The Australian School of Business, UNSW.

== Early life ==
Wynne Chin was born and raised San Francisco, California, where he collected vintage comic books. Chin owns Spider-Man issues 1 through 186.

== Academic career ==
Chin's research interests include information technology diffusion, technology acceptance, and structural equation modeling (SEM) methodologies. He developed the first graphical-based software for PLS analyses in 1988 and is credited with popularizing the method in the 1990s.

Chin teaches a number of graduate and undergraduate classes, including philosophy of science, structural equation modeling, research methods, and related subjects.

In 2007 and 2015, Chin was elected the president of the University of Houston Faculty Senate.

In 2011, Chin was appointed the sommelier of the Association for Information Systems.

He visits Sydney every year and provides intensive PLS training courses at the University of New South Wales.

== Personal life ==
Wynne Chin is married and has two daughters named Christina and Angela. His hobbies include martial arts and wine tasting. Wynne is also an aspiring poker player.
