= Albert Huie =

Jamaican painter (1920–2010)

- Born: 31 December 1920; Falmouth, Colony of Jamaica, British Empire
- Died: 31 January 2010 (aged 89); Baltimore, Maryland, U.S.
- Education: Institute of Jamaica; Camberwell School of Arts and Crafts; Ontario College of Art
- Occupation: Painter

Albert Huie (31 December 1920 – 31 January 2010) was a Jamaican painter.

== Early life and education ==
Born in Falmouth, Trelawny Parish, Jamaica, Huie moved to Kingston when he was 16 years old; in the 1930s, he became part of the "Institute Group" at the Institute of Jamaica, where he received his first formal training with Armenian artist Koren der Harootian. In the early 1940s, Huie worked as an assistant to Edna Manley while she taught at Kingston's Junior Centre.

A British Council scholarship was awarded to Huie in 1947. Further study followed, in London at the Camberwell School of Arts and Crafts and in Canada at the Ontario College of Art, before his return to Jamaica.

== Career ==
In 1950, he was one of the founding tutors of the Jamaica School of Art and Crafts. He exhibited around the United States and Jamaica, and later in his career settled in the US. On National Heroes Day in 2009 he was honored by the Jamaican Embassy for his contributions to the Jamaican community in and around Washington, D.C.

As a painter, Huie was best known for his landscape and genre work, though he often painted portraits as well. Some of his pieces expressed sociopolitical and nationalist themes, and many of his early paintings related in some way to manual labor. His painting Miss Mahoghany caused controversy twice in his lifetime: first when it was unveiled in 1960 and again in 2000 when it was featured in Air Jamaica's Skywritings magazine, which resulted in its removal. His later paintings showed the influence of post-Impressionism, along with elements of art deco and Mexican mural painting. He usually used oils, but sometimes used acrylics. His paintings hang in the National Gallery of Jamaica, among other collections.

=== Awards ===
In 1958, Huie was granted the Institute of Jamaica's Musgrave Silver Medal and in 1974 he was awarded the Musgrave Gold Medal for his work by the Institute of Jamaica. In 1959, he was awarded the international award for painting at the Spanish Bi-Annual exhibition in Havana, Cuba. Huie received the Jamaican Government Award for the Best Painting in the annual National Exhibition in 1962.

== Personal life ==
Huie's granddaughter is artist Lehna Huie. He died on 31 January 2010 in Baltimore, Maryland, aged 89.
