= Edna Manley =

Jamaican artist (1900–1987)

The Most Honourable Edna Manley OM
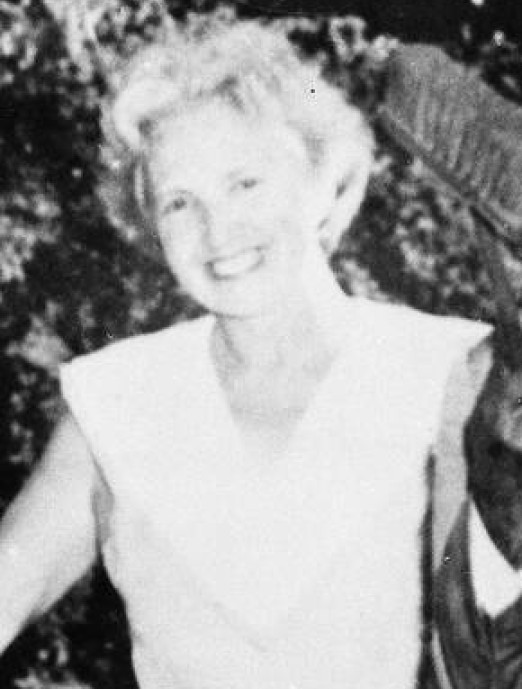
- Manley in 1955
- Born: Edna Swithenbank; 28 February 1900; Jamaica
- Died: 9 February 1987 (aged 86)
- Education: Saint Martin's School of Art; Regent Street Polytechnic; Royal Academy of Arts
- Known for: Sculpture, drawing, painting
- Notable work: Negro Aroused (1935); The Beadseller (1922); The Prophet (1935); The Digger (1936)
- Style: Progressive cubist geometry, modernism, realism, organic/rounded form integration
- Movement: Modernism (Caribbean), Vorticism influences
- Spouse: Norman Manley (m. 1921; died 1969)
- Children: Douglas Manley; Michael Manley

Edna Swithenbank Manley OM (28 February 1900 – 9 February 1987) was a Jamaican artist, known primarily as a sculptor, although her oeuvre included significant drawings and paintings. Trained in British neoclassical tradition, Manley became a major figure in Jamaican art, with her work forming an important part of the National Gallery of Jamaica's permanent collection. Edna Manley was also an early supporter of art education in Jamaica, having both organised and taught art classes at the Junior Centre of the Institute of Jamaica throughout the 1940's.

These classes developed into a more formal setting with the establishment of Jamaica's first Art School, the Jamaica School of Art and Craft in 1950. The school would eventually expand into a college, and in 1995 was renamed the Edna Manley College of the Visual and Performing Arts in honour of the artist's pioneering role in Jamaican Art.

Edna Manley was the wife of Norman Manley, the founder of the Jamaican People's National Party and the 1st Premier of Jamaica. She is often considered the "mother of Jamaican art".

== Personal life ==
=== Early life ===
She was born Edna Swithenbank on 28 February 1900. Her father died when she was nine, leaving his widow to raise all their nine children by herself. Edna Manley was described as incredibly independent, rebellious and spirited, exemplified in the uproar and unrest she caused among her own family as she embraced her 'coloured' ancestry from her mother's side. This ancestry had been swept under the rug due to the possible repercussions it would have had on not only her parents but the whole family during the racially tense times of the early twentieth century.

=== Education ===
After leaving high school Edna studied art at several different institutions including St. Martin's School of Art in London. She also studied privately with Maurice Harding, the animal sculptor, going on to continue her art studies at the Regent Street Polytechnic as well as the St. Martin's School of Art in London. During this time, she had intentions of becoming a zoologist.

In 1921, she married her cousin, Norman Manley. The two met when Norman came to England for university, Edna was only 14 at the time and Norman was eight years her senior. They fell out of touch but later reunited after Norman finished school and while Edna was working at a pension office studying art on the side. The two had a controversial union, due to not only family ties but the obvious deepness of Norman's complexion. They went on to have two children, Michael Manley (a later prime minister) and Douglas Manley, a sociologist and minister in his brother's government, moving to Jamaica in 1922 after Douglas's birth. Edna quickly realized how different the Jamaican middle class was in comparison to the life she knew in England and kept journals of her thoughts, observations, and experiences.

=== Politics ===
The political standings of her husband and children would prove influential to her art as well as impact her life and career in a way she may have never expected. Manley was involved politically, not only through the association of her sons and husband, but also through the subject matter she addressed in her work, such as sexuality, culture and feminism. Manley's feminism influences were arguably due to her first-wave feminist sister, Lena, who fought alongside the suffragettes for the right to vote for females. Though this did not manifest itself in the same way as her sister, she paved a way of her own unique to Jamaica. She did not fight outright for new wave feminism, but her excellence, notoriety and dominance in the predominantly male world of visual arts, fought in their way. Thoughts around socialism also preoccupied Edna's mind following the years after her marriage. As her sons and husband became more a part of the Jamaican political sphere, forming the People's National Party (PNP), Edna also became more preoccupied with Fabian Socialism ideology and avidly supported the party and its socialist democratic ideals. Politics was a large and unavoidable part of her life and would go on to be further highlighted in her works dome in the 1960s and 1970s when Jamaica was dealing with great civil and political unrest.

=== Later years ===
Norman Manley, her husband, died in 1969, leaving her in ruin. She shared that 'after Norman died, the thing that saved me was my art.' In 1975, she decided to delve more into painting, giving up sculpting, due to her age and the strain it placed on her body. She maintained her own identity and did not live in the shadow of her famous husband. Edna Manley died on 2 February 1987, a few weeks short of her 87th birthday. She was an amazing woman in the eyes of many; a woman who carved her path independent of the name of her husband or son and continues to influence and inspire many artists to this day.

== Artistic life ==
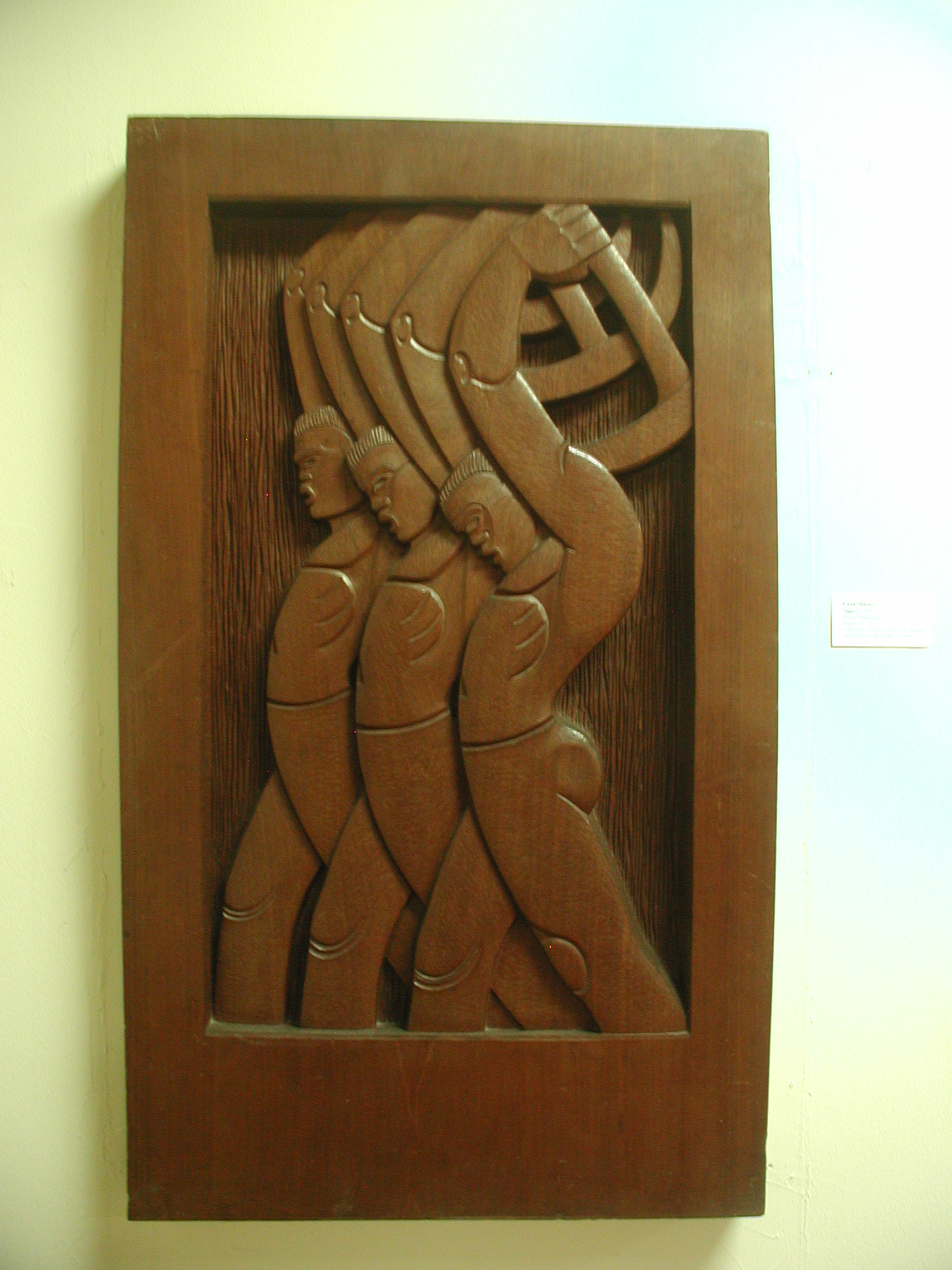
The Diggers by Manley

Early Artistic Life

=== 1900–1925 ===
During this period of Edna's life, she faced frustration at the lack of Exhibitions in Jamaica, as well as the attitudes the people had towards art. To her, it seemed as if people only considered it to be an unimportant hobby to be enjoyed by amateurs but that did not deter her. She created her first Jamaican work that would go onto be one of her most notable, The Beadseller (1922). Her early years were a transitional period, not only stylistically, but during this period she centred herself around adapting and understanding her new home in Jamaica. She began moving away from the academic ways of creating that she was so accustomed to, into a truer version of modernism seen in The Beadseller- inspired by these new and exciting observations of life in Jamaica. Shortly after, the Beadseller was followed up by a male counterpart, The Listener (1922) which also reflected the geometric and cubist style she was exploring. This cubist influence can be directly credited to famous artist Pablo Picasso, who disrupted the European art world with his geometric and exploitative creations. Edna Manley was not safe from his influence as she studied all the art trends and ideas circulating in Europe before her departure to the Caribbean. She brought plaster versions of both these works back to England with her in 1923, which she had cast into bronze on her arrival. This would cause her acceptance into the Society of Women's Artists and had Beadseller displayed in their 1924 Exhibition. She would continue to go between Jamaica and England seeking out exhibition spaces and artistic inspiration.

Back in Jamaica in early 1924, she quickly set to work with new carving tools and produced Wisdom and then the Ape. At that time, too, she began to model realistic portraits in clay first of Norman and the two-year-old Douglas and then of a friend, Esther Chapman. Then, testing the possibilities of her new medium, she did the head of another friend, Leslie Clerk in wood.

=== 1925–1932 ===
Between 1925 and 1929, Manley softened some of her geometric forms, replacing them with more massive, rounded ones. Market Women, a study of two voluptuous women sitting back to back, and Demeter, a carving of the mythical Earth Mother, are indicative of Manley's late-1920s influence. The 1930s saw another change in her sculptural style. She tamed her early-1920s cubist lines with rounder forms, and produced a new, definitive style that lasted into the 1940s. She recalled the strong influence of classical art on her voluptuous sculptures. Her interest in the classical tradition was sparked by the works of Picasso's neo-classicism phase. His Two Nudes of 1906, greatly influenced the neo-classicism of her adolescence.

This voluptuousness can also be seen in her work entitled Eve (1929), which derived from the story of the first woman mentioned in the bible. The overall dimension of the work is 2006.6 x 508mm, and was carved from a single piece of mahogany wood. The nude Eve is seen standing on a circular platform with her head facing behind her. The figure has one hand whose fingers are rolled into a fist to cover her pubis; similar to the arm gestures are a combination of the "Venus Pudica". The other hand is bent at the elbow and covers a breast while the back of the hand awkwardly rests on the shoulder with fingers curled inwards. In this pose of the arm we see the influence of Picasso's Two Nudes. The sculpture is seemingly filled with tension, as suggested by the clenching of the fists, the abnormal twist of the body and the awkward attempt to obscure a breast. The body gives a sense of youthfulness and its long hair flowing downwards onto the chest matches the curvy rhythm of her body. Wayne Brown has described the sculpture as "woman startled to look over her shoulder" an "image of nakedness surprised" yet, Manley seemed had removed all traces of expression from the face of the sculpture of her re-interpretation of Eve and instead focused the expressions into the pose of the figure. Her idea of this sculpture was to draw reference to the expulsion of Eve out of the Garden of Eden. The face looking backwards is also said to represent Eve looking back at the garden after her expulsion.

During the early 1920s, Edna Manley continuously sent her works back to England for exhibition which allowed the works to become greatly recognized by 1927. The first recognition she had received came from the French press, and her works were published in the Les Artistes D’Aujourd’Hui and La Revue Moderne. The author of the articles La Revue Moderne, Clement Morro, had significantly linked her with the modern abstractionists. In 1929, Edna Manley had returned to England with her most recently completed works namely; Eve, The boy and the reed, Torso, The ape ("Edna Manley (1900–1987). This small collection of sculptured has gained entry into the Goupil Summer exhibition which was a major event which took place annually in London.

Her move to Jamaica had a profound impact on her work. She abandoned studying zoology back in London, and her work took on a more "inspired formal elegance", according to Boxer. Manley's materials consisted mostly of native woods—she used yakka, mahogany, Guatemalan redwood, juniper cedar, and primavera. Some work dating from her first year on the island are Beadseller, and Listener. In describing Beadseller, Boxer said, "It was as if in one fell swoop, nearly a hundred years of sculptural development had been bridged: in this, her first work done in Jamaica, Edna seems to have given expression to her ideas about contemporary British sculpture with which she had saturated herself prior to leaving England. Both pieces exhibited Manley's more progressive and cubist style.

Jamaica was facing many political changes during the late 1930s and early 1940s. Members of the African diaspora were looking to do away with the aging colonial system that remained on the island. They were ready for a new social order, and voiced their displeasure with the colonial system by incurring strikes (along with riots), instigating food shortages, and promoting protest marches. Manley's work of the time reflected this civil unrest. Works like "Prophet", "Diggers", "Pocomania", and "Negro Aroused" "caught the inner spirit of our people and flung their rapidly rising resentment of the stagnant colonial order into vivid, appropriate sculptural forms," wrote poet M. G. Smith.

Her works were exhibited very frequently in England between 1927 and 1980. Her first solo exhibition in Jamaica was in 1937. The show marked a turning point in Jamaica's undeveloped art movement, and it prompted the first island-wide group show of Jamaican artists. Manley was also one of the founders of the new Jamaica School of Art. After premiering in Jamaica, her show opened in England, where it was received with much fanfare. It was the last time Manley's work would be shown in London for nearly 40 years.

Active for much of her life as an artist, she also taught at the Jamaica School of Art, now a component of the Edna Manley College of Visual and Performing Arts.

=== 1930 – 1939 ===
1929 brought significant recognition to Edna Manley's early career as a sculptor and artist. This came in the form of Eve which was inspired by Picasso's Two Nudes (1906) and Boy with Reed, a response to Singing Negro statuette (Bibliothèque Nationale in Paris). These two carvings were exhibited at the summer exhibits at the Goupil Gallery in England and received raved reviews. Eve travelled extensively throughout England's art gallery circuit as her captivating presence was magnetic.

Edna and Norman Manley were putting down roots in Jamaica and each was easing into their respective careers with notability. Edna's fledgling art career was taking off and Norman Manley was earning a reputation of being an astute lawyer. Recommendations were well written and submitted for him to be bestowed the enviable appointment of Kings Counsel (KC). This would no doubt boost his law career and came to fruition in August 1932. Despite the financial rewards from his law practice, being among the social elites and awarded the coveted title of KC, Norman Manley struggled with depression seemingly caused from not being able to represent something more meaningful. This sentiment was echoed in his letters to Edna who was away in England due to interest in her art. On returning home to Jamaica, she now too had her own precipitous path to navigate with being a wife, mother and backbone of her family as well as being an artist on the rise. These emotive feelings manifested themselves in the artwork titled Sun and Earth depicting a male and a female in deep embrace, the man's head resting on the chest of the woman. The woman stands erect as a support with one arm around his waist. With the international success of Eve, Boy with Reed and other works such as Dawn, Woman With Basket (in stone), Dance, Sixteen, Seventeen and Rachel the visions of self as an artist and the actual reality of life seems possible and gave her intrinsic strength to carry her family and her art into the unknown future. The aforementioned artworks had a new aesthetic not yet seen anywhere, "voluptuous" was the word used to describe the pieces. Cubism and other avant-garde movements dominated Europe at the time, but Edna Manley's pieces had an air of freshness to them which sparked countless curiosity all over London. Even though the essence of cubism was evident in her sculptures in terms of the positioning of the forms they did not have that hard angular rendering which was evident in her earlier works such as the Beadseller.

By 1934 Jamaica had been experiencing serious economic depression, marked by the decline in exports and the return of disheartened migrant workers from Cuba and Panama. Everywhere in Jamaica persons were clamoring for better pay, more jobs, better job conditions and housing as the common people buckled of under the weight of colonial marginalization. The economic crisis coupled with the agitation for change is creatively summed up in Edna Manley's most famous sculpture, Negro Aroused done in 1935. The sculpture, even though in the round has a high relief quality and depicts an African man with head upturned to the heavens atop square shoulders, a twisting torso and thick slab – like arms set in an unusual akimbo position. He seems to be communicating anguish while looking towards the heavens for a solution or the dawning of a better tomorrow. Other notable sculptures created during this time were, Pocomania, Market Woman, The Prayer, Young Negro, The Diggers and The Prophet.

=== The Prophet ===
The Prophet (1935) at the National Gallery of Art's exhibition of Afro-Atlantic Histories in 2022.

The Prophet is a carving of an African man with powerful, over-emphasized arms raised above his head, creating a diamond shape. His opened palms are affixed one in front of the other similar to when person is waking up and stretching after a deep sleep. The head is turned to the right, looking slightly down with a stern unapproachable face. There is a backward tilt in the upper torso which creates an open stance. Even though the sculpture is not full bodied and only represented from the tip the fingers down to mid thighs, it provokes a ready to fight alertness, combative stance in every sense. The simplification of the form gives it a towering presence of authority which forces the viewer to contend with the determined stare of the seer. The prophet embodies a warrior spirit that has been awoken and forced into action. It explains how the common people at that time were feeling, like that of a gunpowder keg waiting for that opportunistic spark to explode. Mrs. Manley describes The Prophet as:

"A figure that denounce, oh powerfully denounced, cruelty, poverty, injustice and it came, the prophet, the Amos who came down from the hills and denounce the world as he saw it. Denounced those that had so much and offered to the poor and weak so little".

Edna Manley's seemed to be that gauging mirror absorbing and reflecting the plight of the common people through her newfound aesthetic. With a significant body of work Mrs. Manley was ready to tackle England's art world, but before she did, she held her first solo show at the Mutual Life Assurance Society building on Barry Street Kingston Jamaica in January 1937. This was the first solo art show for anyone in Jamaica and was extremely successful, with more than eight hundred people passing through the exhibition. The show lasted for five days but before it ended persons were requesting for the state to purchase Negro Aroused. The sculpture was purchased through organized fundraisers and handed over to the Institute of Jamaica.

In England her exhibition opened on the second of March and lasted for twenty three days and was received with "lukewarm" reviews. Many critics and newspaper articles question her craftsmanship and approach. The lack of political understanding by the English critics who were far removed from the uprisings of political consciousness in Jamaica made it rather difficult for them to truly embrace the significance of the sculptures and only evaluated the pieces based on form. Later that same year Mrs. Manley got sick and spent a lengthy time recuperating. There were great upheavals in Jamaica in 1938, strikes and labour riots caused many arrests and even deaths. No place in Jamaica was spared from the unrest however Westmoreland and Kingston had the biggest foray as the common people pushed for better wages and jobs. A pugnacious agitator for change named Alexander Bustamante was at the front of the line defending the cause of common people, relentless remonstrating landed him in jail. The Peoples National Party (PNP) was also formed by Norman Manley who found his political stride and true purpose which was eluding him for many years. During this time Mrs. Manley completed several pieces of work, notably the piece titled Strike which was a response to the political turbulence going on in the county. The piece not only represented the mood of the people but also captures her deep involvement in political activism with her husband. She also design The Rising Sun logo for the PNP which represented the dawning of Jamaican politics. Other artworks done during 1938 – 1939, were Mrs. Molesworth, Tomorrow, Youth, In the Beginning, Idyll and The Sawyers. These carvings were labeled as "ecstatic carvings" by David Boxer to describe their stylistic similarities in form and movement.

=== Professional life and Horse of the Morning (1940s) ===
Edna Manley produced a number of famed sculpture including, “Negro Aroused” and many more which are a part of her permanent collection at the National Gallery (NGJ) leaning up to the 1940s. Some of her works between (1935) and (1940), are, "Mountain Girl", "The Prophet", and “Pocomania". "Before Thought", "The Forerunner", "Before Truth", and “Into the Mist” followed between (1941) and (1948). These are works that expressed her thoughts on her personal life with family relationship. Edna Manley also created works such as Digger, ink on paper (1940), Dispossessed, Sepia wash on paper and many others. According to the book Edna Manley Sculptor by David Boxer, "In July 1941, she records in a diary: Oh, but I want to carve my two Gods dark and light. I would like to carve them where the echoes of the mountains would take up the song, where the mists… round, where there’s freedom and light and no desire… I want an icy silence and an icy stillness and an icy loneliness…“ In creating the series Dying God, Edna Manley moves away from the elongated style of 1939/40/41 and began a new style. Accord to the book, "It is difficult to define; there are Blakean concepts and motifs, definitely, and motifs occasionally come from other Romantics-Fuseli and Redon perhaps; the works occasionally tend to be 'pictorial' rather than sculptural, yet we sense a unique personal involvement with the materials-yacca, mahogany, Guatemalan redwood, juniper cedar, primavera-and an attempt to capture in these woods the light of Nomdmi". Dying God carving are one of Mrs Manley most universal works and according to the book, one of her most private. Leading up to 1943 Mrs. Manley did an extensive amount of carvings such as, New World, Old World on a large scale just to name a few. In these carvings she mainly focused on design and details. According to the book by David Boxer, "The most successful carving of the Sun God, however, would abandon this system of the cycle of the sun and revert to the image of the spirited horse of the Forerunner.” According to Edna Manley the Diary, "15 April 1943 the mountains help me to realize that I must not strain to work, not worry over what I produce. For me it must flow lawlessly. Of a choice of flawless and lawless it must be the latter. It was not always so, however".

==== Horse of the Morning (1943) ====
Manley carved Horse of the Morning in 1943; the carving was done using Guatemalan redwood. According to the National Gallery of Jamaica Blog, "Her work entered another phase in which she combined private symbolism, inspired by the Jamaican Blue Mountain landscape, with an almost painterly approach to form and surface. Horse of the Morning (1943), which was donated to the collection by Edna Manley’s son and former Prime Minister of Jamaica, the late Michael Manley, is arguably the best-known work of this cycle." Mrs. Manley went on to explained Horse of the Morning's genesis: according to the book by David Boxer, "It was early in the morning… I wanted to watch the dawn come up, and I went along the little path behind the house, and I did see him leap from behind the mountains. I saw him… he was there for an instant and then he was gone. But I did see him." The book went on to state that "Horse of the Morning presents a specific aspect of the Sun God, namely his sexual, libidinous self. Caught in a moment of searing erotic intensity with phallic leg and carefully articulated 'ping pong ball' eyes that red both on the suns and as symbols of a fully charged sexuality."

=== Professional life 1950s ===
Edna Manley promoted the development of Jamaican art as a teacher, coordinator and patron and contributed in the founding of the Jamaica school of art and craft in 1950. Although the 1950s and 1960s were less active years for Edna Manley, she produced a few works. National Gallery of Jamaica In 1951, Edna Manley was tasked her first public commission which involved the creation of a crucifix for the all saints Anglican church in downtown Kingston, The crucifix was devoted in commemoration of Joseph Francis an elder of the church on 10 December 1951. The sculpture of these years were subsequently secluded pieces and usually they were commissioned work.

The year of 1952 was spent tussling with ideas for a competition in Britain for a monument to the unknown political prisoner. In May she began a small carving, the carving in fact a preparatory carving in the true sense and was quite independent of the ideas for the monument. The Secret is a charismatic work in which is in smaller format and has a basic idea of night. Moreover, from this period is a small satin wood plaque, designed to fit into the center of a gramophone cabinet this commission came from Noël Coward. He had recognized a home on the north coast of the island. Its attitude is one significant to that of the secret but its subject, the two heads of a man and a woman, with hands raised in characteristics Manley gesture represents an intimate dialogue between the sexes. Edna Manley titled it the mountains. The exception of a small terracotta mountain woman dated 1956, no sculpture has surface from the period 1952 to 1958 although there is evidence that other terracottas from this period may exist. We also know that an exhibition of drawing was planned for the institute of Jamaica in 1954 but even this was cancelled because there was not enough new works to warrant the exhibition. Edna did take part in tercentenary exhibition held at the institution of Jamaica in November 1955.

Into the sun. a black man, astride a white horse with blazing sun eyes, charges across the heavens from the darkness of the day. Coming as it did during the early months of the campaign for the general election of 1955. The image is a descendant of negro aroused cast now as a man of action and set now in the context of the sun and moon symbolism developed in the forties. He is the herald of the new Jamaica charging forth and claiming his "place in the sun". in 1958 the chips started flying again and an impressive coda to the dying god series, growth resulted the basic idea involves themes exposited in the independent work such as the Sun God Heads of 1941 and The Horse of the Morning of 1943. The horse of the morning surmounted by the sun god, a head of infinite wisdom and energy. The link between the two zones in the top most figure of the bank of the sleeping figures who just begins to lift his head and opens his eyes as he re-awakes to another existence. Growth was completed in time for its inclusive in the all island exhibition of sculpture which opened in October 1958 at the institution of Jamaica, at which time it was acquired by the institute. In 1959, it saw the creation of a far more intimate carving a commission from friends the artist chose as the subject a young girl endearing embracing a small goat. Inspired by her 12-year-old granddaughter Rachel, who had come to Jamaica to live with Edna and Norman in 1949, which speaks to a since innocence.

=== Into the Sun (1954) ===
Into the Sun is an inventive reproduction of Edna Manley's work. It depicts a colored man in the foreground hugged on to a white horse; the horse is situated in a galloping pose and the figure on him clamps on tightly to the horse with his left arm stretched out pointing forward. The background shows two different times of day and uses the Sun and Moon in symbolizing the difference between each side. Beneath him lies a green mountain with two different shades of green. The side of the mountain to the left with a night-like background expresses to be darker than that side which has a day background. It also gives the indication of the horse and the man riding towards the Sun. however, the iconography of the horse appears in other works in the decade such as Only the Brave, where a male and a female are joined in one silhouette situated on the mountain top. There two horse comes to rear up beside them. The horse of the night and the horse of the morning. The Moon and Sun are also symbolized in this piece and reign in the sky. Similarly, the Growth. The 1950s and 60s were deemed crucial periods in which Edna Manley's iconography was being developed. Finding many codas to the Dying God Cycle such as the mahogany relief Growth (1958) and the drawing Into the Sun (1954) and none but the Brave (1960) as well as the anthropomorphic mountain imagery of the mountains.

== "Negro Aroused" – the art piece ==
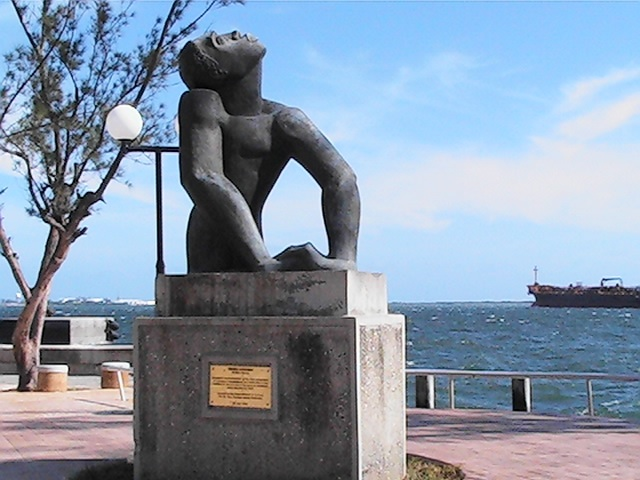
The sculpture Negro Aroused by Edna Manley on Kingston Waterfront

While she was at London, Manley had discovered that the people of Jamaica had collected the money to buy her piece "Negro Aroused". Individuals pitched in whatever they could afford, purchasing the piece to begin a national art collection. She was highly moved by this act, partly because she claimed that it was such a difficult piece for her to create: "Negro Aroused,...was trying to create a national vision, and it nearly killed me, it was trying to put something into being that was bigger than myself and almost other than myself," Manley told Sculpture Review.

The original sculpture of "Negro Aroused" was created in 1935 and was first exhibited in 1937. From its exposure, "Negro Aroused" excited the public's imagination; it was acquired by public subscription and presented to the Institute of Jamaica to form a nucleus for its modern art collection. This collection in 1974 became the basis for the National Gallery of Jamaica collection.

In 1977, work began to enlarge the sculpture and to create a monument to the workers of Jamaica and the Worker's Movement that was born in 1938. Edna Manley was commissioned to recreate the work in bronze, at a scale three to four times that of the original. She was assisted by several young sculptors. Prior to being shipped to New York for bronzing, the seven-foot version was destroyed in a warehouse fire.

In 1982, Manley produced a third version, closer in size to the original, but it incorporated some subtle changes she had introduced in the destroyed sculpture.

In 1991, the sculpture was posthumously enlarged by utilizing the "scaling up" technique of bronze foundries for the enlargement of a sculpture. The third version was selected because it was closer in size to the destroyed version. The cost was met by public subscription.

== Professional life (1960s) and The Bogle Statue ==
Norman Manley entered politics, and founded the People's National Party in 1938. Although Edna Manley was hesitant at first, she quickly accepted her husband's place—and her own—in Jamaican politics. She also designed The Rising Sun logo for the People's National Party. The beginning of Jamaica's new government-—and the fall of colonialism-—was reflected in Manley's work, which at the time dealt with the cyclical, birth-and-death themes of the sun and moon. Her work was also heavily influenced by the nature that surrounded her at Nomdmi, the mountain retreat she had built with her husband.

Many commissions awaited Edna Manley in the 1960s, such as Mother and Child Tondo for the Children's Hospital and The Bush which was not Consumed for the Webster United Church.

Manley had always been interested in Rastafari and in 1961, she made a series of drawings using young Rastafarians which served as the backbone for her carving Brother Man. This helped her to come to terms with her philosophy was seen as suspicious and regarded with animosity.

The 1950s and 1960s were quiet times for Manley as an artist. Her husband became more involved with politics, becoming the chief minister of Jamaica in 1955. Manley's responsibilities as the wife of a politician left little time for art. In 1958, she designed the Flag of the West Indies Federation. She held her third exhibition at the Hills Galleries in 1960 (gallery opened in 1953), where she only showed drawings as she had very little time to make sculptures due to the opposition politics of Norman Manley and the People's National Party. Her works were mostly of women and having mythological concepts. A few of these works include Youth Early and Night Flower. One of her works I Saw My Land (1960) shows the significance of Norman Manley to Jamaica as his goal was to deliver the country. In 1965, she created a statue of Paul Bogle to commemorate his martyrdom in Jamaica's 1865 Morant Bay Rebellion. The Morant Bay Rebellion was due to the unrepresentative nature of the Jamaican government and the economic problems that Jamaica was suffering from during this time. This meant that the mass of black Jamaicans had no feeling of being represented by their government. Paul Bogle was the leader and was hanged as punishment for leading the last large-scale rebellion for voting rights and an end to legal discrimination and economic oppression against African Jamaicans. He was recognized as a national hero in Jamaica in 1969.

The statue was highly controversial because it was the first Jamaican public monument to depict a black man in Jamaica. The statue was a commission in 1964 by Edward Seaga commemoration of the centenary of the Morant Bay Rebellion She was unable to get a proper description as there were not photographs available of Bogle at the time. This caused Edna to then see information elsewhere as this was very vague, they quoted that he was "black and shiny heavy marks of smallpox on face, especially on nose…large mouth, red thick lips; about five feet eight inches tall, broad shoulders… no whiskers.", so she visited Stony Gut and received a bit of information from an old woman who had said "But, Bogle was a BOLD man." the form of the statue was created and it was seen as a symbol of Bogle. She made various Maquette and sketches of Bogle. The statue has been in front of the Morant Bay Courthouse.

The 'Bogle' statue was made in 1965. She made numerous maquettes as her ideas constantly changed and her visions for the statue fluctuated. the finished piece stood tall and upright with a machete in hand having the blade point downwards. both elbows raised as his hands firmly held the machete showing his seriousness and passion. Prominent muscles and rib cage are seen along with sunken cheeks, broad nose and big eyes. This piece was seen as controversial once an image of how Paul Bogle actually looks surfaced as Morant Bay stakeholders wanted a new statue to be done that really looked like Bogle. The photographer is unknown. When Edna arrived to Morant Bay Court to put up the statue, she was met with rage from Bogle's followers wanting him alive and Edna was smug with her responses yet polite.

Manley returned, in her personal carvings, to the animal sculptures that she did as a young woman. Norman Manley became ill in August 1968 with a respiratory illness, which worsened by 6 October. he had various illnesses such as his blood pressure was giving him problems. Edna Manley stated: " He woke at night with his first attack of cardiac asthma." In 1968, she was commissioned to make a Mary where she captured emotion using geometry rather than facial expression and entitled it The Grief of Mary. Within a year of the completion of the work, by 1969, Edna Manley's husband (Norman Manley) had died on 2 September and buried at the National Heroes Park. After Norman Manley's death, Edna started her mourning period. He had helped Jamaica to achieve total independence from Britain and self-government by 1962. Manley's carvings during this period were very personal—-reflections on her husband's death, her pain, and sense of loss. She retreated to the mountains and created "Adios," a piece interpreted as lovers in a last embrace, and "Woman," an agonized woman in reclusion. Before Norman died, Edna created a small, rough clay study of an angel cradling a small figure in one of its wings upwards reaching for the heavens. it is as if she knew in her heart that he would die soon. The end of this grieving period was marked by her creation of the triumphant "Mountain Women". She had accepted the loss of her husband. "I felt that because my roots were here in Jamaica, I could survive," she told Americas. "It was my return to the world after that period of intense grief.

After creating several more profound carvings, including "Faun", "Message" and "Journey", Manley gave her carving tools away to a young Jamaican sculptor and declared that she would never work with wood again. Instead, she worked with modeled terracotta or plaster casts. During the 1970s, the major themes of Manley's work were expressions of her "grandmother," or "old woman" image, of matriarchal society, and memories of her life with her husband Norman.

Manley continued to sculpt until her death in 1987. Although a great deal of her work was intensely personal, she created a body of sculpture that embodies Jamaican culture and spirit. English novelist Sir Hugh Walpole, a collector of her work, spoke at the opening of her 1937 London show. "There is a very strange and curious spirit there and Mrs. Manley has got within that strange spirit," he remarked. "There is in Jamaica a beauty that finds its expression through her, that comes partly from the Jamaican material she uses, partly from her own individuality, and partly also, I think, from the sort of sense of beauty that the different people of Jamaica themselves possess." For Manley, expressing the beauty of Jamaica was second nature. "I carve as a Jamaican for Jamaica," she told Americas, "trying to understand our problems and living near to the heart of our people."

== Professional life 1970s–1987 ==
The late 1960s to early 1970s were a sad period in Edna Manley's life, where her husband Norman Manley was ill and died. Most of her works during this mourning period were intense and expresses grief, some of these works are: Angel (1970), Kingston parish church, Journey (1974), National Gallery of Jamaica Woman (1971), Adios (1971). Journey was the last wooden carving done by Edna Manley, all her works after that was modeled in clay and cast, she started exploring other Medias like drawing and painting. According to the book Edna Manley Sculptor by David Boxer "After a short break which saw the five completed Mourning Carvings exhibited at the Bolivar Gallery in an enormously successful one-man exhibition (her first include sculpture since 1948), Edna returned once again to carving and two more works were added to the series.” The book also states "it is a symbol of the inner, frightened self and while she was carving the Faun, the initial ideas for Journey began to surface.” Manley played a major role in helping her husband fight for Jamaicans independence and despite her husband's death she continued to play a major role in the cultural development of Jamaica. Between 1970 and 1974 Edna Manley did two solo exhibitions, in 1971 she did one at Bolivar Gallery, Kingston with eighteen sculptures and the other in 1973 at Spelman College, Atlanta, Georgia, with fifteen sculptures and three drawings. In 1972, three years after the death of Norman Manley, who had served as Jamaica's first and only premier, Edna's son Michael followed his father's political footsteps and was elected prime minister of Jamaica.

=== Ghetto Mother ===
Ghetto Mother was a sculpture done by Edna Manley in 1981. It shows five characters, with the larger character seeming to be the mother looking to the sky with a sad look on her face while the other four characters around her seeming to be her children have gestures and facial expressions of sadness and fear. There are two children to the front and two in the back, one of the two in the front has two hands on its jaw and the other child is kneeling down in a praying position. The child to the left at the back has his hand in his mouth and the one on the left has his hand on his chest. The mother seems to be kneeling down by the positioning of her hands.

=== Death ===
According to Rex Nettleford in Edna Manley: Sculptor a Retrospective: "During Edna Manley's final years, she re-created several older works, some of which are on view in the introductory lobby. Perhaps the finest re-creation is tomorrow (1985) which is based on one of the major examples of ecstatic carvings of the late 1930s. The same ecstatic, spiritual atmosphere prevails in most of Edna Manley’s last works and several ponder on the subject of death and rebirth. This is movingly illustrated by such works as The Listener (1986), future (1983), the painting Birth (1986) and the studies for Raising of Lazarus on which the artist was working until the day before her death on 10 February 1987."

When Edna Manley died in 1987, she was accorded an official funeral and buried in the tomb of Norman Manley at the National Heroes Park, her work having earned her the unofficial title of "Mother of Jamaican Art"

== Works ==
Her works include:

- "Whisper"
- "Into The Mist"
- "Before Thought "
- "Moon"
- "Eve (Ceremonial Dance)"
- "Into The Sun"
- "Growth"
- "The Ancestor"
- "The Mother"
- "Negro Aroused"
- "Pocomania"
- "Diggers"
- "Man and Woman"
- "Bead Sellers "
- "The Trees are Joyful"
- "Rainbow Serpent"
- "Rising Sun"
- "Prophet"
- "Ghetto Mother"
- "Mountain Women"

and others mentioned above.

== Legacy ==
The Jamaican School of Art was renamed the Edna Manley College of the Visual & Performing Arts in 1995 to commemorate her life; enduring legacy; and impact on Jamaican art, Caribbean Art and the art world as whole. The renaming of the institution was part of its reclassification as a tertiary institution. Edna Manley was selected in part because of her contributions to Jamaica's art, which included co-founding the school in 1950, a school that is still the only of its kind in the English-speaking Caribbean. A long list of awards and prizes were awarded to her in lifetime, including:

- Silver Musgrave Medal of the Institute of Jamaica (1929)
- Gold Musgrave Medal of the Institute of Jamaica (1943)
- Honorary Degree of Doctor of Letters from the University of the West Indies (1975)
- The Order of Merit (Jamaica, 1986)

In June 2023, a large crater on the planet Mercury was named in her honor.

== Diaries ==
Her granddaughter Rachel Manley edited her diaries which were published in 1998.
