= National Gallery of Jamaica =

- Established: 22 November 1974
- Location: Kingston Mall, Kingston, Jamaica; National Gallery West, Montego Bay, Jamaica
- Type: Public art museum
- Collections: Jamaican art, international art
- Director: Veerle Poupeye (2009–2018)
- Owner: Government of Jamaica

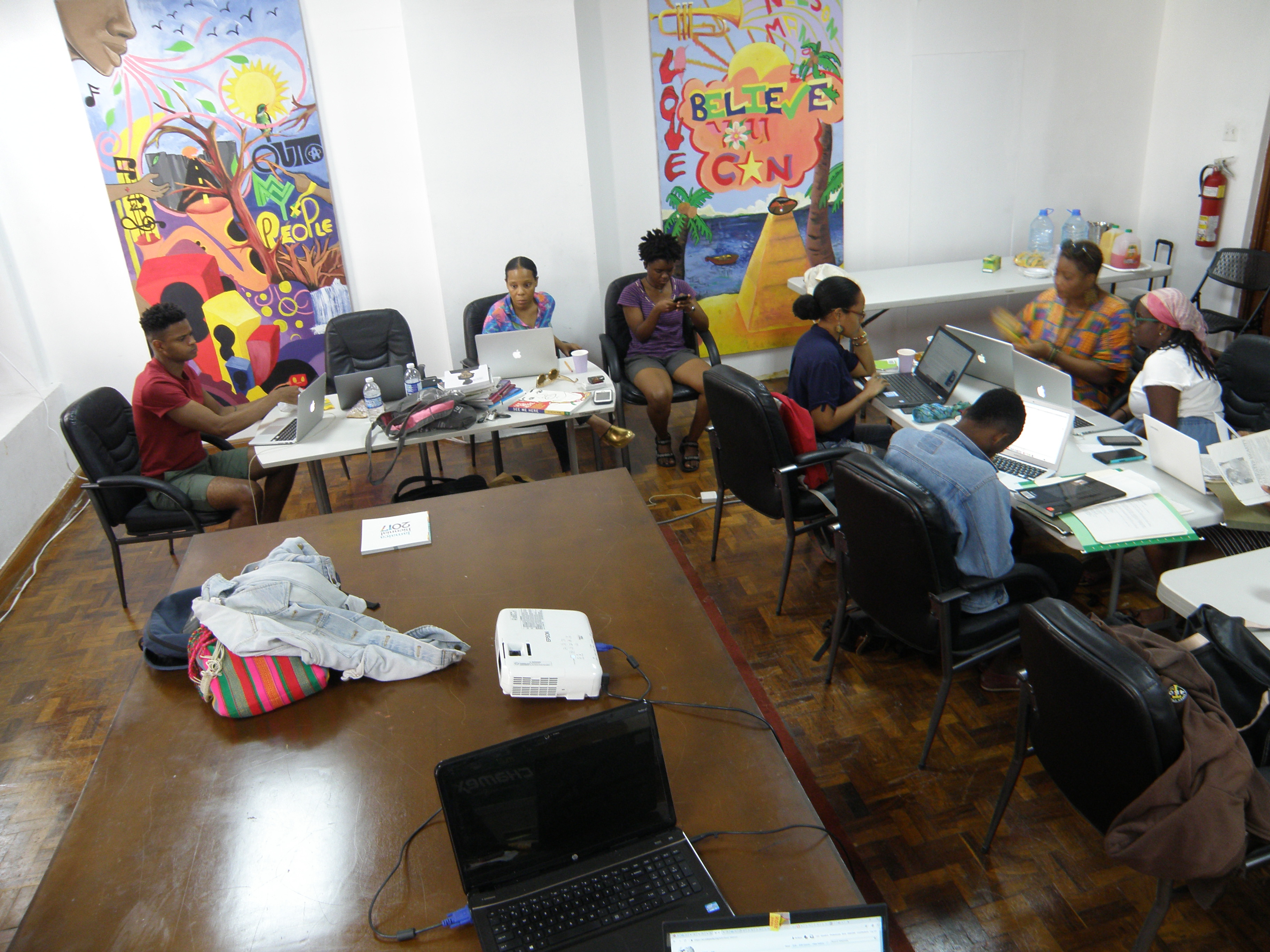
BLT Wikipedia Edit-a-thon at the National Gallery of Jamaica 23

The National Gallery of Jamaica, in Kingston, Jamaica, is Jamaica's public art museum. It was established in 1974 and is located in the Kingston Mall, a commercial and cultural center on Kingston harbour. The National Gallery of Jamaica also has a branch in Montego Bay, National Gallery West.

The gallery houses various important works, mostly by artists from Jamaica, including John Dunkley, Mallica "Kapo" Reynolds, Edna Manley, Barrington Watson, Albert Artwell, Everald Brown, Cecil Baugh, Albert Huie, Carl Abrahams, Osmond Watson, Judy Ann MacMillan, Omari Ra, Laura Facey, Jasmine Thomas-Girvan, Petrona Morrison, Hope Brooks, Ebony G. Patterson, Philip Thomas and Leasho Johnson.

The National Gallery also exhibits works by various international artists and traveling exhibitions. It offers research material on Jamaican art and culture, and coordinates educational programmes.

== History ==
In 1972 an advisory committee was set up, including Sam Hart, Vayden McMorris, Edna Manley, Ralph Thompson, Bernard Lewis, Osmond Watson and Karl ‘Jerry’ Craig and on 22 November 1974 the National Gallery of Jamaica (NGJ) opened at Devon House, supervised by Liz Milner. Its initial collection comprised 237 paintings and drawings and 25 sculptures that were transferred from the Institute of Jamaica. Maurice Facey was appointed the first Chairman of the NGJ Board of Directors and served in this capacity until 1977 when John Maxwell was appointed as the second chairman of the board. On 2 December 1975 the first appointments were made: David Boxer (director/curator), Vera Hyatt (deputy director), Roy Case (director of development).

On 19 July 1976 Five Centuries: Art in Jamaica since the Discovery, the first major survey exhibition on Jamaican art opened, curated by David Boxer. The inaugural Annual National Exhibition opened on 13 October 1977. It superseded the All Island and Self-Taught Artist annual exhibitions previously held at the Institute of Jamaica. In 1978 Boxer curated The Formative Years: Art in Jamaica 1922-1940 which established 1922, the year Edna Manley arrived and started producing art in Jamaica, as the symbolic start date of modern Jamaican art.

In 1979 an exhibition called Intuitive Eye, curated by David Boxer, which introduced the concept of ‘Intuitive art’, opened.

In 1981 Maurice Facey was again appointed Chairman of the NGJ Board of Directors and in 1982 the Gallery moved to the Roy West Building, downtown Kingston where Kapo: The Larry Wirth Collection, was established as a permanent gallery. In 1983 the travelling exhibition Art in Jamaica: 1922 to 1982 was launched as a collaboration between the NGJ and the Smithsonian Institution Travelling Exhibition Service (SITES). Curated by David Boxer and Vera Hyatt it was shown at various venues in the US, Canada and Haiti and finally at the NGJ in 1986.

In 1985 the Young Talent ’85 exhibition was held, starting the series, Young Talent. Other Young Talent exhibitions followed in 1989, 1995, 2002 and 2010. In 1986 the first exhibition of installation art in Jamaica, Six Options curated by Rosalie Smith-McCrea was held.

The first Caribbean Invitational exhibition, curated by David Boxer opened in 1988. Participating artists included Francisco Cabral (Trinidad and Tobago), Annalee Davis (Barbados), Brent Malone (Bahamas) and Bernard Sejourne (Haiti). Another Caribbean Invitational was held in 1996.

Several other exhibitions and retrospectives were held in the intervening years (for a complete list see here). In 1992 Aaron Matalon became the third Chairman of the NGJ Board of Directors.

On 1 March 2000 the Edna Manley Galleries opened, dedicated to Manley’s life and work, featuring work from the Edna Manley Memorial Collection and other sources.

In 2003 Maria Jones became the fourth and thus far only female Chair of the NGJ Board of Directors. In 2006 Trevor Blake became the fifth Chair and in 2008 Wayne Chen was appointed sixth Chairman of the NGJ Board of Directors. In 2009 Veerle Poupeye was appointed the first female Executive Director of the Gallery and in 2012 Peter Reid is appointed seventh Chairman of the NGJ Board of Directors. In January 2014 Charles Campbell began as Chief Curator and continued in this capacity until 31 July. In 2016 Senator Tom Tavares-Finson became the eighth Chairman of the Board of the NGJ.

== Developments since 2014 ==
Date	Significant Events
December, 2014	The National Biennial is renamed Jamaica Biennial and opens on 7 December 2014. In addition to the traditional invited and juried artists sections, the exhibition also incorporated 'Special Projects' which featured art projects by a select group of major Caribbean artists. The Jamaica Biennial 2014 was also the first to be in multiple locations simultaneously.
16 January, to 14 February 2015	A selection of seven child art works produced by participants of the NGJ's Saturday Art-Time programme were featured in the 19th Hamada Children Independents international exhibition, which was organized by the Hamada Children's Museum in Hamada City, Japan. The seven artworks which represented Jamaica in the exhibition were subsequently donated to the Hamada Children's Museum.
28 Feb – 27 May 2017	Jamaica Biennale opens with a focus on local and Caribbean artists. Tributest to two influential Jamaican artists, the painter Alexander Cooper (1934–2000) and photographer Peter Dean Rickards (1969–2014), accompanied the biennale.
28 May 2017	Former Director/Curator and Chief Curator of the NGJ, Dr. David Boxer O.J. passes away.
5 January 2018	Executive Director Veerle Poupeye resigns.
29 April – 24 June 2018	John Dunkley: Neither Day nor Night — the largest gathering of Dunkley's work since his posthumous retrospective in 1976 opened at the NGJ. The exhibition was realised through a collaborative effort with the Perez Art Museum Miami (PAMM), where it debuted, running from 26 May 2017 to 14 January 2018. It was curated by Diana Nawi, independent curator formerly of PAMM, now based in Los Angeles and Nicole Smythe-Johnson, independent Jamaican curator and writer. The exhibition was on view at NGJ until 24 June 2018.
28 June – 21 October 2018	Eleven artworks from the NGJ's permanent collection were among 380 artworks from Africa, Latin America and Europe featured in the exhibition Histórias Afro-Atlânticas, organized by and held at the Museu de Arte de São Paulo Assis Chateaubriand and the Instituto Tomie Ohtake in São Paulo, Brazil.

== See also ==
- List of national galleries
