= Institute of Jamaica =

Cultural and scientific organisation

The Institute of Jamaica (IOJ), founded in 1879, is the country's most significant cultural, artistic and scientific organisation: a patron and promoter of the arts in Jamaica, sponsoring exhibitions and awards. It is also the country's museums authority, as well as administering other national arts and cultural outlets including the National Gallery, the African Caribbean Institute of Jamaica, and the Jamaica Journal.

== History ==
The Institute of Jamaica was established in 1879 by Sir Anthony Musgrave, then governor of Jamaica, "For the Encouragement of Literature, Science and Art in Jamaica", and as such was designed to help Government in the promotion and preservation of culture in the island. It is Jamaica's "most significant cultural, artistic and scientific organization". In the words of the late Edna Manley: "When I pay tribute to the Institute, I like to think back over the years to the twenties - when there was almost nothing that stood for the encouragement of any of the Arts or Sciences. Only the Institute stood like a beacon in its attempt to create an atmosphere where creativity could hope to flourish. The Institute stood for integrity. It also had the strength and intelligence to survive. Let the Institute survive, beaming aloft its flame of integrity."

The IOJ is located at 10-16 East Street, Kingston, Jamaica, and has responsibility for the following organizations:

- The African Caribbean Institute of Jamaica /Jamaica Memory Bank (ACIJ/JMB).
  - Liberty Hall: Legacy of Marcus Garvey – a project of the ACIJ/JMB
- The Jamaica Music Museum (JAMM)
- The Junior Centres (Programmes Coordination)
- The Natural History Museum of Jamaica
- The Museums of History and Ethnography
- The National Gallery of Jamaica

The function of the Institute varies according to the role of each division. These include: to establish and maintain museums and galleries for the collection, preservation and presentation of artefacts and art treasures (National Museum Jamaica); to maintain and display Jamaica's flora and fauna collections (Natural History); to document and disseminate information on the impact of the African presence in Jamaica and the wider Caribbean (ACIJ/JMB), with Liberty Hall as a unit of the ACIJ formed to promote the memory of Marcus Garvey including through educational programmes and exhibitions; to develop the potential of children in visual and performing arts and to broaden their appreciation of Jamaica's culture (Junior Centres); and to acquire Jamaican art for public display (National Gallery).

== Publications ==
The IOJ publishes Jamaica Journal, originally the Journal of the Institute of Jamaica, established in 1896.

== Awards ==
The Musgrave Medal has been awarded by the Institute of Jamaica since 1897 for excellence in the fields of arts, sciences and literature.

The Gleaner Company presented the Institute of Jamaica with the Gleaner Honour Award "For its unyielding and invaluable contribution to Arts and Culture in 2014, staunchly preserving Jamaica's heritage."
