= List of Jamaican artists =

This is a list of Jamaican artists (in alphabetical order by last name) of various genres, who are notable and either born in Jamaica or associated with Jamaica, including sculptors, ceramists, painters, photographers and designers.

== A ==
- Carl Abrahams (1911–2005)
- Panteha Abareshi (born 1999)
- Pearl Alcock (1934–2006)
- Esther Anderson (born 1946)
- Deborah Anzinger (born 1978)

== B ==
- Lindsay Barrett (born 1941)
- Isaac Mendes Belisario (1795–1849)
- William Berryman (active 1808–1816)
- Jacqueline Bishop (living)
- Hope Brooks (born 1944)
- Alicia Lisa Brown (living)

== C ==
- Camille Chedda (born 1985
- Margaret Chen (born 1951)
- Leonard Chin (born 1953)
- Walter Chin (living)
- Albert Chong (born 1958)
- Renée Cox (born 1960)
- Thomas Craskell (died 1790)

== D ==
- John Dunkley (1891–1947)

== E ==
- Gloria Escoffery (1923–2002)

== F ==
- Elsie Few (1909–1980)
- Fowokan (George Kelly; born 1943)
- Armet Francis (born 1945)
- Ania Freer

== G ==
- Christopher González (1943–2008)
- Lorna Goodison (born 1947)

== H ==
- Guy Harvey (born 1955)
- Ras Daniel Heartman (1942–1990)
- Dorothy Henriques-Wells (1926–2018)
- Albert Huie (1920–2010)

== K ==
- Kofi Kayiga (born 1943)

== L ==
- Maria LaYacona (1926–2019)
- Peter Wayne Lewis (born 1953)
- Errol Lloyd (born 1943)

== M ==
- Dave McKenzie (living)
- Tamara Natalie Madden (1975–2017)
- Edna Manley (1900–1987)
- Ronald Moody (1900–1984)
- Keith Anthony Morrison (1942–2026)
- Petrona Morrison (born 1954)

== N ==
- Richard Nattoo (born 1993)

== P ==
- Eugene Palmer (born 1955)
- Ebony Patterson (born 1981)
- Charlie Phillips (born 1944)
- David Pottinger (1911–2004)
- Mavis Pusey (1928–2019)

== R ==
- Roy Reid (1937–2009)
- Mallica Reynolds (1911–1989)
- Namba Roy (1910–1961)
- Ruddy Roye (born 1969)

== S ==
- Kenneth Abendana Spencer (1929–2005)

== V ==
- Margaret Rose Vendryes (1955–2022)

== W ==
- Nari Ward (born 1963)
- Barrington Watson (1931–2016)
- Basil Watson (born 1958)
- Osmond Watson (1934–2005)
- Cosmo Whyte (born 1982), Jamaican-born American visual artist and educator

== See also ==
- List of Jamaicans
- Jamaican art
