= Jamaican art =

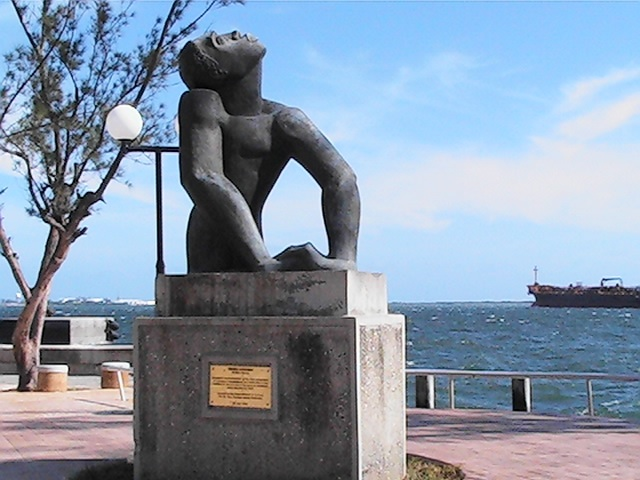
Public Monument, Negro Aroused, Kingston Waterfront

Jamaican art dates back to Jamaica's indigenous Taino Indians who created zemis, carvings of their gods, for ritual spiritual purposes. The demise of this culture after European colonisation heralded a new era of art production more closely related to traditional tastes in Europe, created by itinerant artists keen to return picturesque images of the "new world" to Europe. Foremost among these were Agostino Brunias, Philip Wickstead, James Hakewill and J. B. Kidd.

Perhaps the earliest artist to take a more Jamaican-centered approach to the island culture was Isaac Mendes Belisario (1795–1849). His portfolio of lithographs, Sketches of Character, In Illustration of the Habits, Occupation, and Costume of the Negro Population in the Island of Jamaica, published in collaboration with the lithographer Adolphe Duperly in 1837–38, documents activities of slaves immediately after their emancipation.

== Early Jamaican pottery ==
During the colonial period, slaves became an integral part of contributing to the economy apart from their slave masters in the 1670s. This helped the country of Jamaica to be able to build capital outside of slave labor. The goods built in order to contribute to said capital were often food and livestock but would also incorporate crafts. An addition to the Jamaican slave laws in 1711 allowed for slaves to legally make and distribute pottery, baskets, and rope. Pots, pipes, and buckets made from earthen material (Clay), were often traded amongst slaves themselves, or sold to the lower working class. Many of the pottery materials and innovations are dated back to West Africa where many slaves were taken from and brought to Jamaica. Pottery continues to be an integral part of Jamaican economy, but also continues be misunderstood and underrepresented.

== The modern movement ==
The National Gallery of Jamaica dates the nationalist-oriented art movement to the beginning of the twentieth century and the arrival of Edna Manley to Jamaica in 1922. Her observations and journals on art and artists from that time have provided early documentation on the movement's development. Her work, Bead Seller (1922), has been used as the earliest work in the National Gallery of Jamaica's permanent collection of mode. Educated in the UK, she publicly criticized Jamaica's local artwork as "anaemic," believing that it demonstrated a preoccupation with European-styled landscapes and portraiture, using traditional techniques that insufficiently reflected Jamaica's culture and people. Manley strongly urged for Jamaican artist to create art that demonstrated their heritage and pride, in turn dismissing European influence and values. Her support of volunteer art classes at the Institute of Jamaica fostered the talents of artists such as Albert Huie, Ralph Campbell, Henry Daley, and Osmond Watson. The classes in 1950 became formalized into an art program offered at the Jamaica School of Art, an institution that was later named the Edna Manley College of Visual and Performing Arts, as a tribute to her contribution.

During the 1950s and 1960s, many of Jamaica's artists received formal training in Britain as a result of scholarships provided by the British Council. Ralph Campbell attended classes at Goldsmiths College; Barrington Watson trained at the Royal College of Art; and Osmond Watson studied at St Martins. Each artist developed his own representational style, influenced by post-impressionism, realism, and cubism, respectively. All three artists returned to teach at the Jamaica School of Art.

Since the island declared independence in 1962, Jamaican art has swung between two styles that Chief Curator, David Boxer, has defined as "mainstream" and "intuitive." "Mainstream" references Jamaica's trained artists, more often exposed to art trends and styles used abroad. This style was typically adopted by Jamaican artist due to the necessity to earn a profit on their artwork and to attract tourist. The 'intuitive' movement consists of artists who maintain stronger links with African forms of expression, are predominantly closed to any external influences, and are usually self-taught. During the 1980s, a trend towards the fusion of these two styles was apparent in the work of artists such as Milton George, Omari Ra (aka African or Robert Cookhorne), and Khalfani Ra (aka Makandal Dada or Douglas Wallace). Smithsonian curator Vera Hyatt labelled them New Imagists, referencing the way the body in convulsive forms dominates their canvases.

== Recent trends ==
In the 1990s, a greater awareness of post-modern trends and a connection with Jamaica's wider diaspora communities in Britain, Canada, and the US saw many artists such as Albert Chong, Anna Henriques, Petrona Morrison, Margaret Chen, and David Boxer reappraising their personal cultural histories. They began revisiting the sites of their ancestral origins (be they indigenous Amerindian cultures, African, or European), having a greater need to understand and visualize the Jamaican experience and their own sense of place within the Caribbean. But events in Jamaica have overtaken these concerns, turning an even younger generation of artists' attention inwards. Many of Jamaica's contemporary artists in the 1990s were concerned with post-colonial issues of identity and place. They explored these issues through group shows, such as the Caribbean Biennales and other regional exhibitions. This allowed them to establish commonality with artists from other islands.

The art of this past decade appears to be shifting in focus once again. Younger artists, such as Ebony G. Patterson, Michael Elliot, Phillip Thomas, Christopher Irons, and Peter Rickards, are engaging with issues of violence, homophobia, and social dislocation that have been a feature of Jamaica's recent past. These are events and trends that are still unfolding, but they suggest that this generation of artists is having to compete with the more glaring aspects of the country's popular culture related to dance hall, ghetto fabulous fashions, street art, and the aesthetics of bling funerals for a stake in the nation's visual memory.

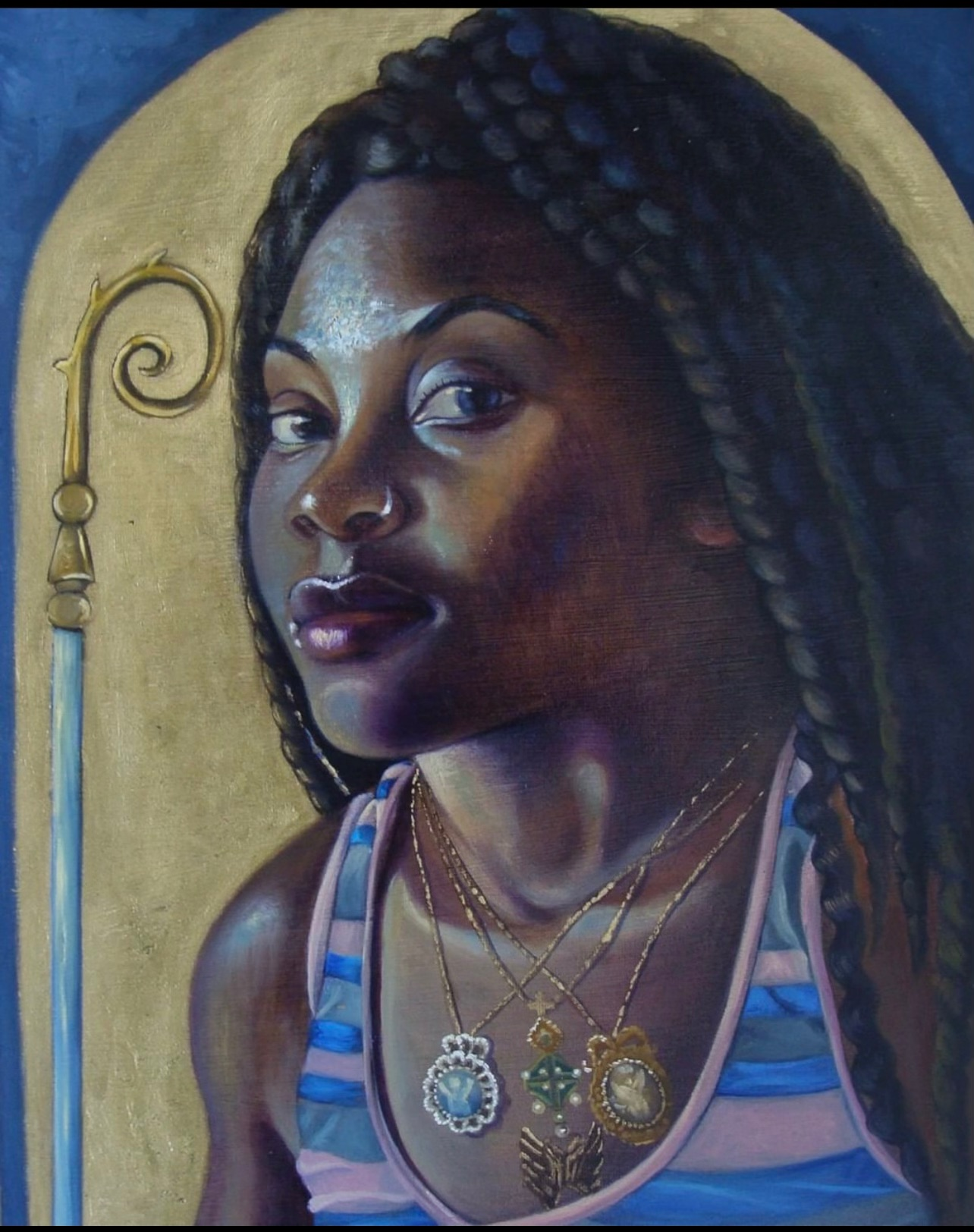
Victoria Gallery Painting, Priest 2, The Theresa Roberts Collection

Theresa Roberts, a collector and Jamaican native, migrated to the United Kingdom at a young age. She prioritizes the highlighting and promotion of Jamaican art and artist around the world. She has contributed to spreading knowledge of Jamaican art and she was also involved in the creation of the International Slavery Museum in Liverpool, United Kingdom. The Theresa Roberts Collection exhibition is the first UK exhibition that features and showcases only Jamaican artist artwork. Beginning, in Liverpool the exhibition will start in 2022. One artwork by "Priest 2," 2017, from the Roberts' collection, and has begun to receive international recognition. Made by Alicia Lisa Brown, a Jamaican artist, the oil on canvas painting is 16” x 12”. The exhibition will be held at the Victoria Gallery & Museum in Liverpool, UK from February to July 9, 2022. Paintings, mixed media installations, sculpture, and film will be on display.

== See also ==
- Category:Jamaican artists
- Culture of Jamaica
- List of Jamaican artists

== Bibliography ==
- Rachel Manley, Drumblair: Memories of a Jamaican childhood, 1997
- David Boxer & Veerle Poupeye, Modern Jamaican Art, Kingston: Ian Randle Publishers, 1998
- David Boxer, Edna Manley Sculptor, 1990
- Smithsonian Institution (SITES), National Gallery of Jamaica (exh. cat.) Jamaican Art 1922-1982, 1983
