= Abolitionism in the United Kingdom =

Movement to end slavery

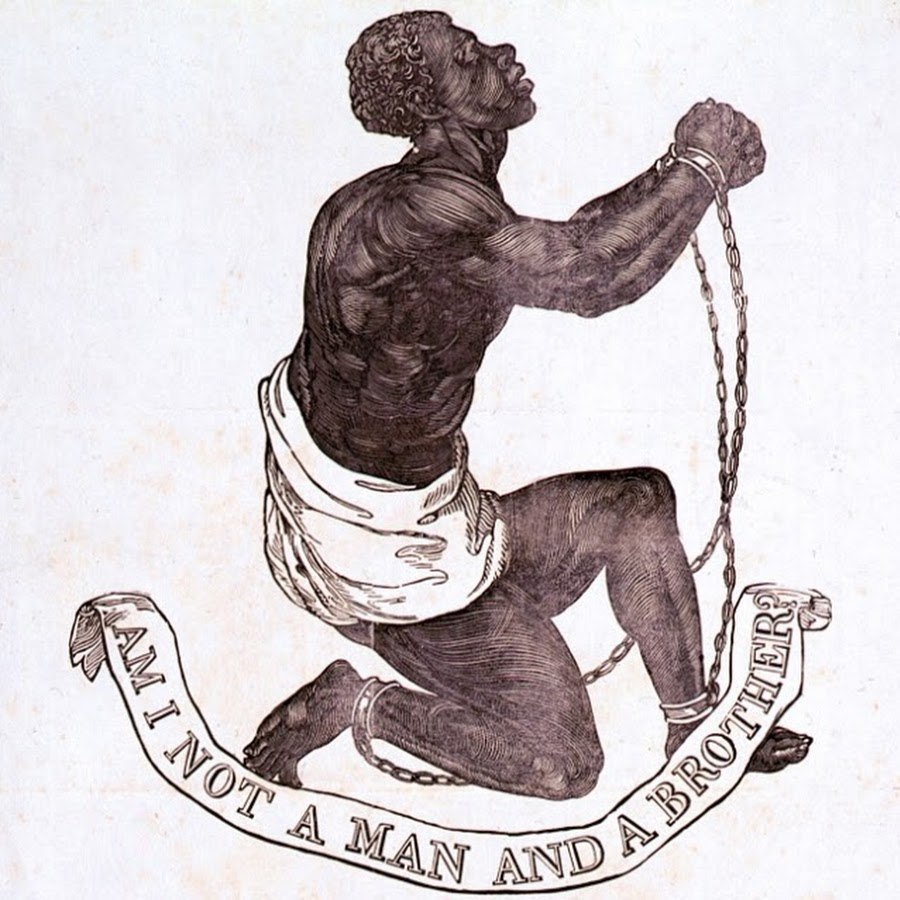
1787 Wedgwood anti-slavery medallion designed by Josiah Wedgwood for the British anti-slavery campaign

Abolitionism in the United Kingdom was the movement in the late 18th and early 19th centuries to end the practice of slavery, whether formal or informal, in the United Kingdom, the British Empire and the world, including ending the Atlantic slave trade. It was part of a wider abolitionism movement in Western Europe and the Americas. It spanned over a century and involved a wide range of activists, politicians, religious groups, and former slaves.

== Origins ==
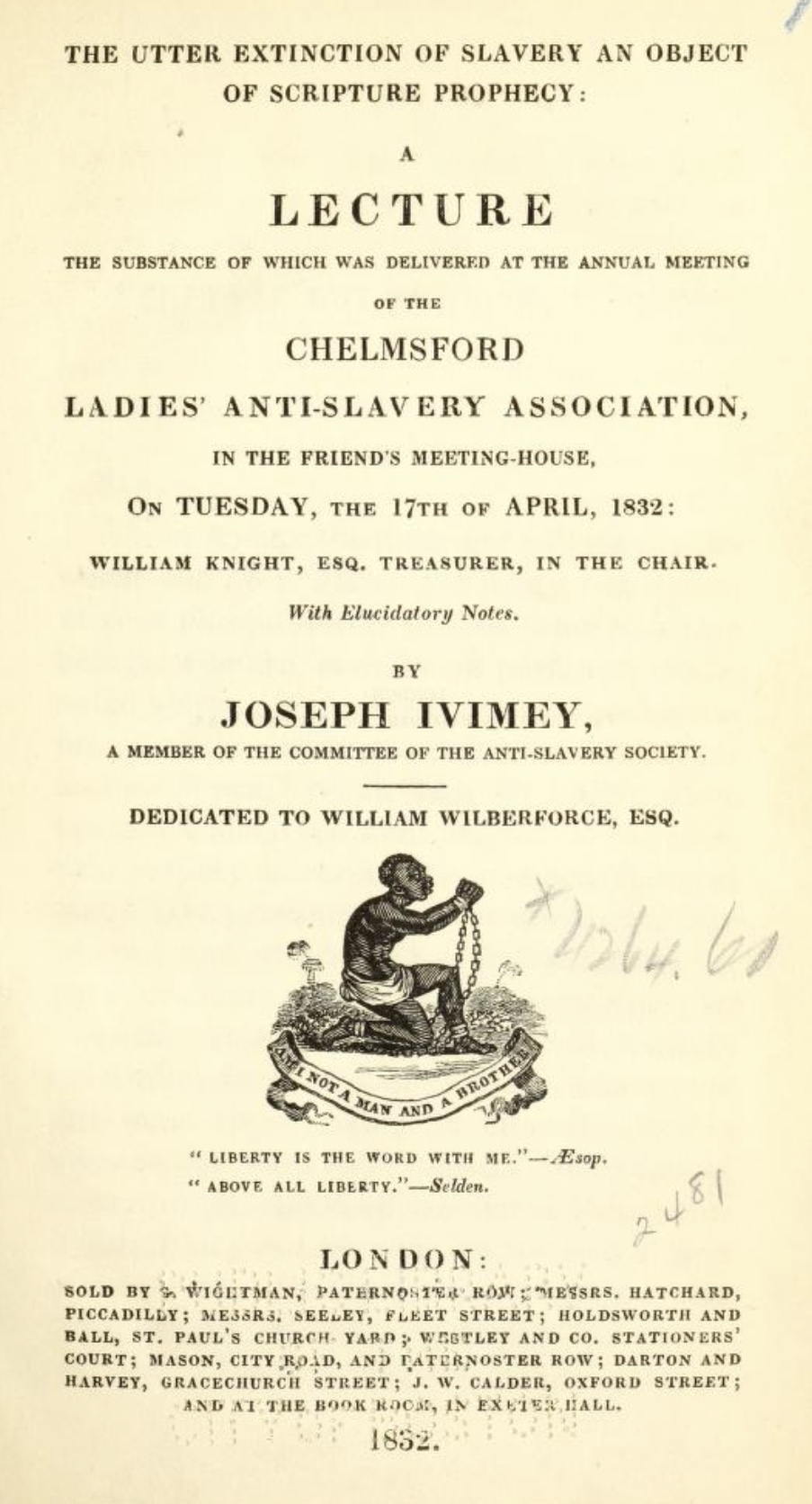
Title page of a published lecture against slavery by Joseph Ivimey

In the 17th and early 18th centuries, English Quakers and a few evangelical religious groups condemned slavery (by then applied mostly to Africans) as un-Christian. A few secular thinkers of the Enlightenment criticised it for violating the rights of man. James Edward Oglethorpe was the first to act on the Enlightenment case against slavery on humanistic grounds. In his "Georgia Experiment" he convinced Parliament to ban slavery in his Province of Georgia from 1735. However, slavery was reinstated in 1751. He also encouraged his friends Granville Sharp, who founded the Society for the Abolition of the Slave Trade, and Hannah More to pursue the cause vigorously. Soon after his death in 1785, they joined with William Wilberforce and others in forming the Clapham Sect.

The slave trade had been banned in England in 1102, by the Church Council of London, convened by Anselm. However, the council had no legislative powers, unless decreed and signed by the monarch. In Cartwright's Case of 1569 regarding the punishment of a slave from Russia, the court ruled that English law could not recognise slavery, as it was never established officially. This ruling was overshadowed by later developments. It was upheld in 1700 by Lord Chief Justice Sir John Holt when he ruled that "As soon as a man sets foot on English ground he is free".

English colonists imported slaves to the North American colonies and by the 18th century, traders began to import slaves from Africa, India and East Asia (where they were trading) to London and Edinburgh to work as servants. Men who migrated to the North American colonies often took their East Indian slaves or servants with them, as East Indians have been documented in colonial records. David Olusoga wrote of the sea change that had taken place:

To fully understand how remarkable the rise of British abolitionism was, both as a political movement and as a popular sentiment, it is important to remember how few voices were raised against slavery in Britain until the last quarter of the eighteenth century.

Some of the first freedom suits, court cases in Britain to challenge the legality of slavery, took place in Scotland in 1755 and 1769. The cases were Montgomery v. Sheddan (1755) and Spens v. Dalrymple (1769). Each of the slaves had been baptised in Scotland and challenged the legality of slavery. They set the precedent of legal procedure in British courts that would later lead to success for the plaintiffs. In these cases, deaths of the plaintiff and defendant, respectively, brought an end to the action before a court decision could be rendered.

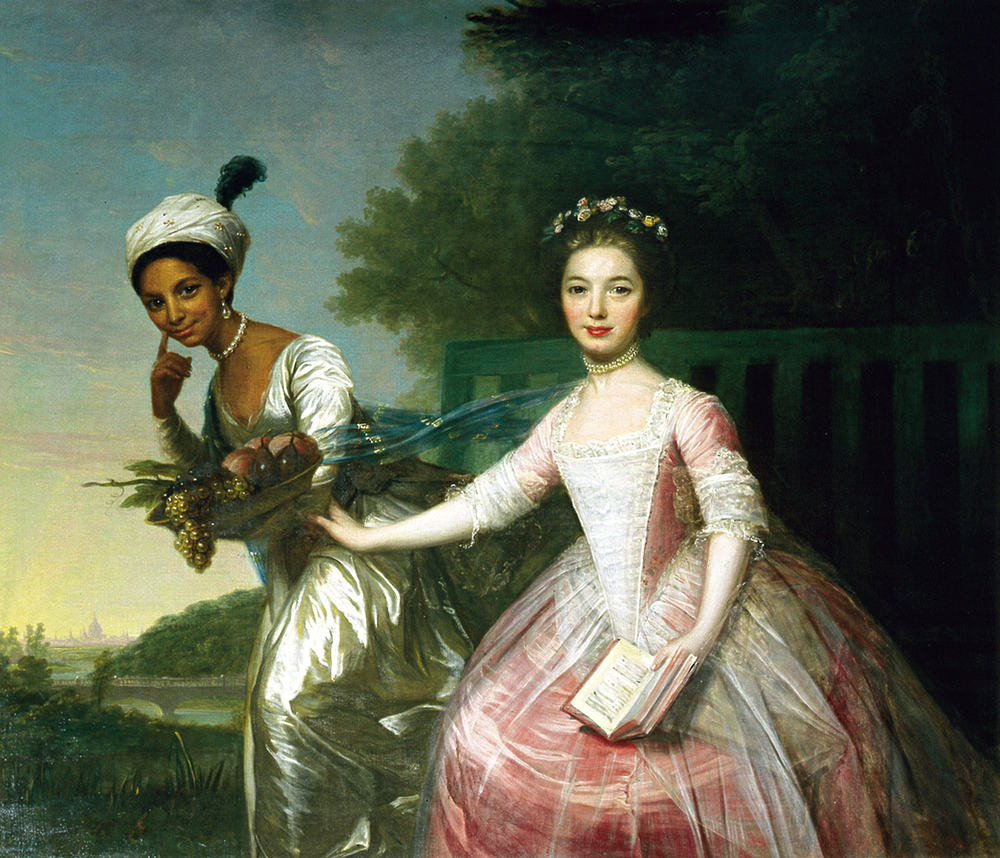
Portrait of Dido Elizabeth Belle Lindsay and Lady Elizabeth Murray, the great-nieces of Chief Justice Lord Mansfield living at Kenwood House. Dido Elizabeth Belle and Lady Elizabeth Murray by David Martin, 1778

African slaves were not bought or sold in London but were brought by masters from other places. Together with people from other nations, especially non-Christian ones, Africans were considered foreigners and thus ineligible to be English subjects; England had no naturalisation procedure. The African slaves' legal status was unclear until Somersett's Case in 1772, when the fugitive slave James Somersett forced a decision by the courts. Somersett had escaped and his master, Charles Steuart, had him captured and imprisoned on board a ship, intending to ship him to Jamaica to be resold into slavery. While in London, Somersett had been baptised and three godparents issued a writ of habeas corpus. As a result, Lord Mansfield, Chief Justice of the Court of the King's Bench, had to judge whether Somersett's abduction was lawful or not under English Common Law. No legislation had ever been passed to establish slavery in England. The case received national attention and five advocates supported the action on behalf of Somersett.

In his judgment of 22 June 1772, Mansfield held,

The state of slavery is of such a nature that it is incapable of being introduced on any reasons, moral or political, but only by positive law, which preserves its force long after the reasons, occasions, and time itself from whence it was created, is erased from memory. It is so odious, that nothing can be suffered to support it, but positive law. Whatever inconveniences, therefore, may follow from a decision, I cannot say this case is allowed or approved by the law of England; and therefore the black must be discharged.

Although the legal implications of the judgement are unclear when analysed by lawyers, the judgement was generally taken at the time to have determined that slavery did not exist under English common law and was thus prohibited in England. By 1774, between 10,000 and 15,000 slaves gained freedom in England. The decision did not apply to British overseas territories; e.g. the American colonies had established slavery by positive laws. Somersett's case became a significant part of the common law of slavery in the English-speaking world and it helped launch the movement to abolish slavery.

After reading about Somersett's Case, Joseph Knight, an enslaved African who had been purchased by his master John Wedderburn in Jamaica and brought to Scotland, left him. Married and with a child, he filed a freedom suit, on the grounds that he could not be held as a slave in Great Britain. In the case of Knight v. Wedderburn (1778), Wedderburn said that Knight owed him "perpetual servitude". The Court of Session of Scotland ruled against him, saying that chattel slavery was not recognised under the law of Scotland and slaves could seek court protection to leave a master or avoid being forcibly removed from Scotland to be returned to slavery in the colonies.

At this point the plantocracy became concerned, and got organised, setting up the London Society of West India Planters and Merchants to represent their views. From its inception in 1780, the organisation played a major role in resisting the abolition of the slave trade and that of slavery itself. The Society brought together three different groups: British sugar merchants, absentee planters and colonial agents.

Writing critically of English altruism in abolishing the slave trade, African-American historian W. E. B. Du Bois in 1948 said,

The rise of liberal and philanthropic thought in the latter part of the eighteenth century accounts, of course, for no little of the growth of opposition to slavery and the slave trade; but it accounts for only a part of it. Other and dominant factors were the diminishing returns of the African slave trade itself, the bankruptcy of the West Indian sugar economy through the Haitian revolution, the interference of Napoleon and the competition of Spain. Without this pressure of economic forces, Parliament would not have yielded so easily to the abolition crusade. Moreover, new fields of investment and profit were being opened to Englishmen by the consolidation of the empire in India and by the acquisition of new spheres of influence in China and elsewhere. In Africa, British rule was actually strengthened by the anti-slavery crusade, for new territory was annexed and controlled under the aegis of emancipation. It would not be right to question for a moment the sincerity of Sharpe, Wilberforce, Buxton and their followers. But the moral force they represented would have met with greater resistance had it not been working along lines favorable to English investment and colonial profit.

== Activists organize ==
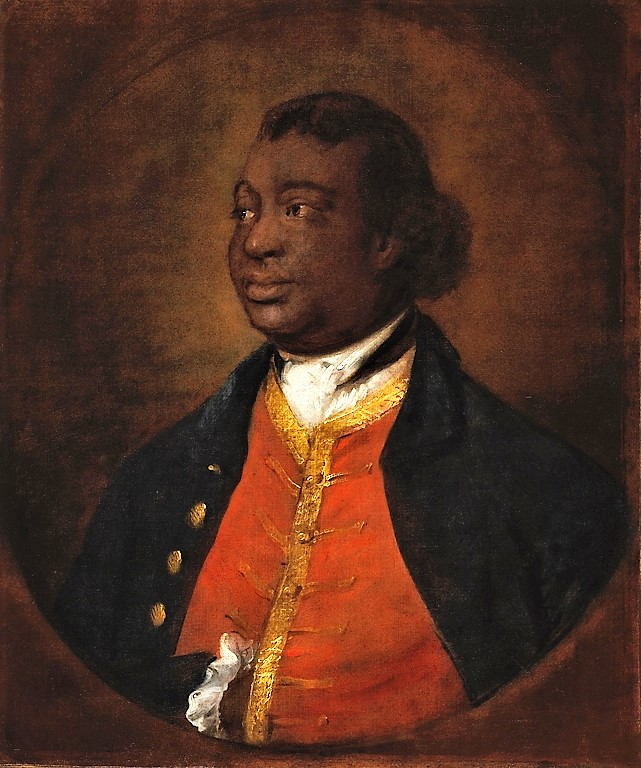
Ignatius Sancho (c. 1729–1780), an escaped slave, gained fame as an active 18th-century British abolitionist. He opened a popular shop in Mayfair and mixed with influential people. He was the first person of African descent to vote.

Antislavery sentiment may have grown in the British Isles in the first few years after the Somersett case. In 1774, influenced by the case and by the writings of Quaker abolitionist Anthony Benezet, John Wesley, the leader of the Methodist tendency in the Church of England, published Thoughts Upon Slavery, in which he passionately criticised the practice. In his 1776 A Dissertation on the Duty of Mercy and Sin of Cruelty to Brute Animals, the clergyman Humphry Primatt wrote, "the white man (notwithstanding the barbarity of custom and prejudice), can have no right, by virtue of his colour, to enslave and tyrannise over a black man." In 1781 the Dublin based Universal Free Debating Society challenged its members to consider if "enslaving the Negro race [is] justifiable on principles of humanity of [sic] policy?"

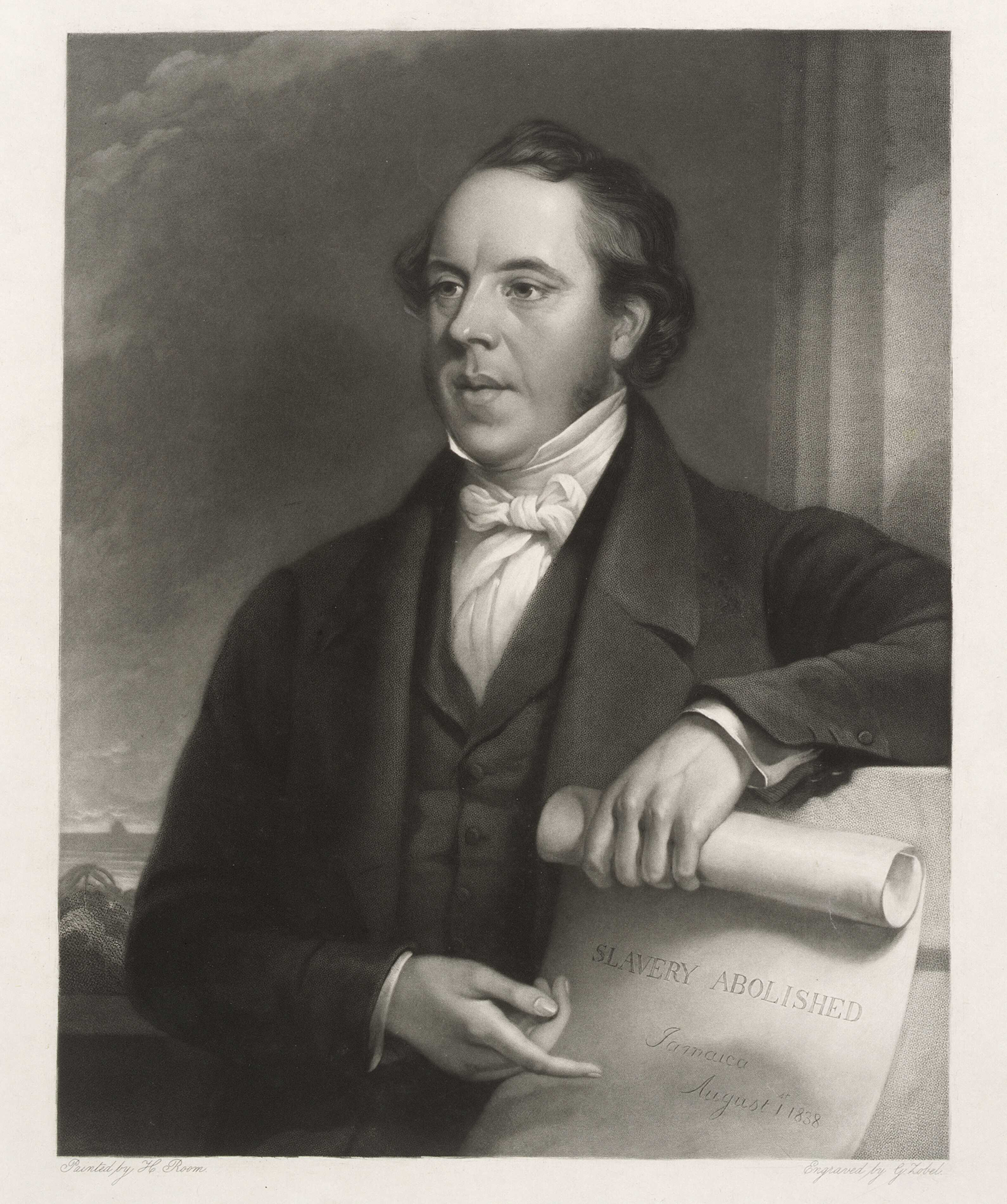
Thomas Clarkson (1760–1846) dedicated his life to ending slavery, he travelled 35,000 miles visiting ports gathering evidence against the slave trade to present to parliament.

Despite the ending of slavery in Great Britain, the West Indian colonies of the British Empire continued to practice it. British banks continued to finance the commodities and shipping industries in the colonies they had earlier established which still relied upon slavery, despite the legal developments in Great Britain. In 1785, the English poet William Cowper wrote,

We have no slaves at home.—Then why abroad?
And they themselves once ferried o'er the wave
That parts us, are emancipate and loos'd.
Slaves cannot breathe in England; if their lungs
Receive our air, that moment they are free,
They touch our country and their shackles fall.
That's noble, and bespeaks a nation proud
And jealous of the blessing. Spread it then,
And let it circulate through ev'ry vein
Of all your empire. That where Britain's power
Is felt, mankind may feel her mercy too.

Cowper was a close friend of John Newton, who had been involved in the slave trade during his naval career. In later life, following his conversion to Christianity, and his ordination in the Church of England, Newton was an active abolitionist. He described slavery as a "stain on our National character." One important contribution by Newton to the abolition of slavery was his influence on William Wilberforce. Newton convinced Wilberforce that he would achieve more by remaining in Parliament than by becoming a priest in the Church of England.

In 1783, an anti-slavery movement began in Britain. That year a group of Quakers founded their first abolitionist organisation. The Quakers continued to be influential throughout the lifetime of the movement, in many ways leading the campaign. On 17 June 1783, Sir Cecil Wray (one of the Members of Parliament for Westminster) presented the Quaker petition to parliament. Also in 1783, Beilby Porteus, Bishop of Chester, issued a call to the Church of England to cease its involvement in the slave trade and to formulate a policy to improve the conditions of Afro-Caribbean slaves. The exploration of the African continent by such British groups as the African Association (1788) promoted the abolitionists' cause. Such expeditions highlighted the sophistication of African social organisation; before this, Europeans had considered them 'other' and uncivilised. The African Association had close ties with William Wilberforce, who became known as a prominent figure in the campaign for abolition in the British Empire.

Africans themselves played a visible role in the abolition movement. In Britain, Olaudah Equiano, whose autobiography was published in nine editions in his lifetime, campaigned tirelessly against the slave trade. Also important were horrific images such as the famous Wedgwood anti-slavery medallion of 1787 and the engraving showing the ghastly layout of the slave ship, the Brookes.

== Growth of the movement ==
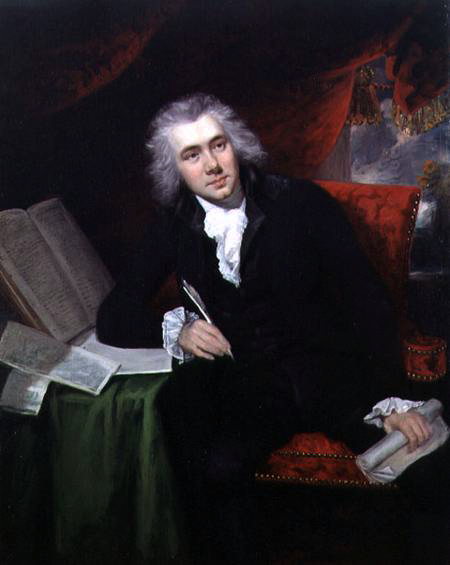
William Wilberforce (1759–1833), politician and philanthropist who was a leader of the movement to abolish the slave trade. Between 1789 and 1807, Wilberforce raised 12 parliamentary bills to ban the slave trade, succeeding on the last attempt.

After the formation of the Committee for the Abolition of the Slave Trade in 1787, William Wilberforce led the cause of abolition through the parliamentary campaign. It finally abolished the slave trade in the British Empire with the Slave Trade Act 1807. He continued to campaign for the abolition of slavery in the British Empire, which he lived to see in the Slavery Abolition Act 1833.

In 1787, Thomas Clarkson, Granville Sharp, and other abolitionists founded the Society for the Abolition of the Slave Trade, considering the termination of the transatlantic slave trade a necessary precursor to the complete abolition of slavery. The society employed various methods to advance its cause, including the dissemination of firsthand accounts from formerly enslaved individuals such as Olaudah Equiano, the promotion of consumer boycotts against goods produced by enslaved labor, and the organization of petitions directed at the British Parliament.

The Atlantic slave trade, also called Triangle trade, encompassed the trafficking in slaves by British merchants who exported manufactured goods from ports such as Bristol and Liverpool, sold or exchanged these for slaves in West Africa (where the African chieftain hierarchy was tied to slavery), and shipped the slaves to British colonies and other Caribbean countries or the American colonies. There traders sold or exchanged the slaves for rum and sugar (in the Caribbean) and tobacco and rice (in the American South), which they took back to British ports. The merchants traded in three places with each round-trip. Political influence against the inhumanity of the slave trade grew strongly in the late 18th century.

Europeans and Africans worked for abolition of the slave trade and slavery. Well-known abolitionists in Britain included James Ramsay, who had seen the cruelty of the trade at first hand; the Unitarian William Roscoe who courageously campaigned for parliament in the port city of Liverpool for which he was briefly M.P., Granville Sharp, Thomas Clarkson, Josiah Wedgwood, who produced the "Am I Not A Man And A Brother?" medallion for the Committee; and other members of the Clapham Sect of evangelical reformers, as well as Quakers.

Quakers made up most of the Committee for the Abolition of the Slave Trade and were the first to present a petition against the slave trade to the British Parliament. As Dissenters, Quakers were not eligible to become British MPs in the late 18th and early 19th centuries. The Anglican evangelist William Wilberforce led the parliamentary campaign. Clarkson became the group's most prominent researcher, gathering vast amounts of data and gaining first-hand accounts by interviewing sailors and former slaves at British ports such as Bristol, Liverpool and London.

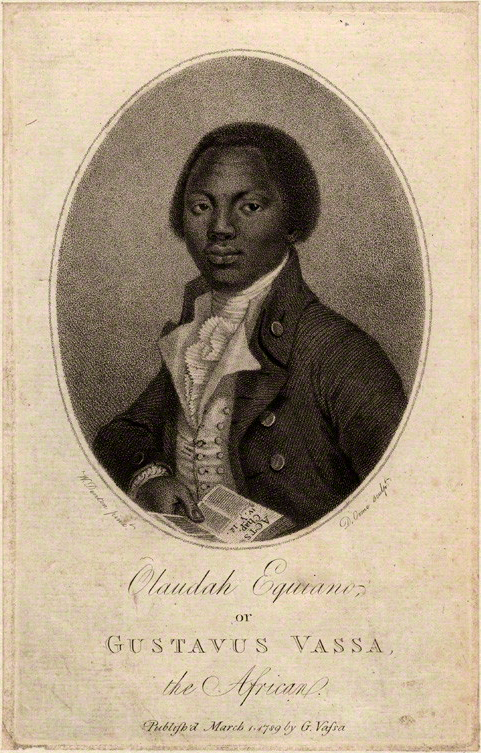
Olaudah Equiano (c. 1745–1797) After purchasing his freedom, Olaudah was an active abolitionist and wrote a best selling memoir which influenced the abolitionism movement.

Clarkson trailed the country setting up a network of 1,200 local abolition groups. They campaigned through public meetings and the publication of pamphlets and petitions, a petition in 1792 got 400,000 signatures and the petition in 1814 got 1,375,000 signatures. One of the earliest books promoted by Clarkson and the Committee for the Abolition of the Slave Trade was the autobiography of the freed slave Olaudah Equiano. The movement had support from such freed slaves, from many denominational groups such as Swedenborgians, Quakers, Baptists, Methodists and others. They reached out for support from the new industrial workers of the cities in the Midlands and north of England. Even women and children, previously un-politicised groups, became involved in the campaign especially the successful sugar boycott. At this time, women often had to hold separate meetings as there were social rules against their appearing in public meetings. They could not vote, nor could the majority of the men in Britain at the time.

In 1792, after multiple petitions had been presented, the House of Commons voted in favour of the gradual abolition of the slave trade, a decision subsequently reversed by the House of Lords, which wanted to hear its own evidence for and against the trade.

The abolitionists negotiated with chieftains in West Africa to purchase land to establish 'Freetown' – a settlement for former slaves of the British Empire (the Poor Blacks of London) and the United States. Great Britain had promised freedom to American slaves who left rebel owners to join its cause during the American Revolutionary War. It evacuated thousands of slaves together with its troops and transported 3,000 Black Loyalists to Nova Scotia for resettlement. About a decade later, they were offered a chance to resettle in Freetown and several hundred made the move. Freetown was the first settlement of the colony of Sierra Leone, which was protected under a British act of Parliament in 1807–08. British influence in West Africa grew through a series of negotiations with local chieftains to end trading in slaves. These included agreements to permit British navy ships to intercept chieftains' ships to ensure their merchants were not carrying slaves.

Also from 1800 the Royal African Corps was recruited from West African volunteers, and eventually included freed slaves from the Caribbean before it was disbanded in 1819.

In 1796, John Gabriel Stedman published the memoirs of his five-year voyage to the Dutch-controlled Surinam in South America as part of a military force sent out to subdue bosnegers, former slaves living in the interior. The book is critical of the treatment of slaves and contains many images by William Blake and Francesco Bartolozzi depicting the cruel treatment of runaway slaves. It was an example of what became a large body of abolitionist literature.

== Slave Trade Act 1807 ==
The Slave Trade Act was passed by the British Parliament on 25 March 1807, making the slave trade illegal throughout the British Empire. It was partly enforced by the West Africa Squadron. The Act imposed a fine of £100 for every slave found aboard a British ship.

== Slave Trade Felony Act 1811 ==
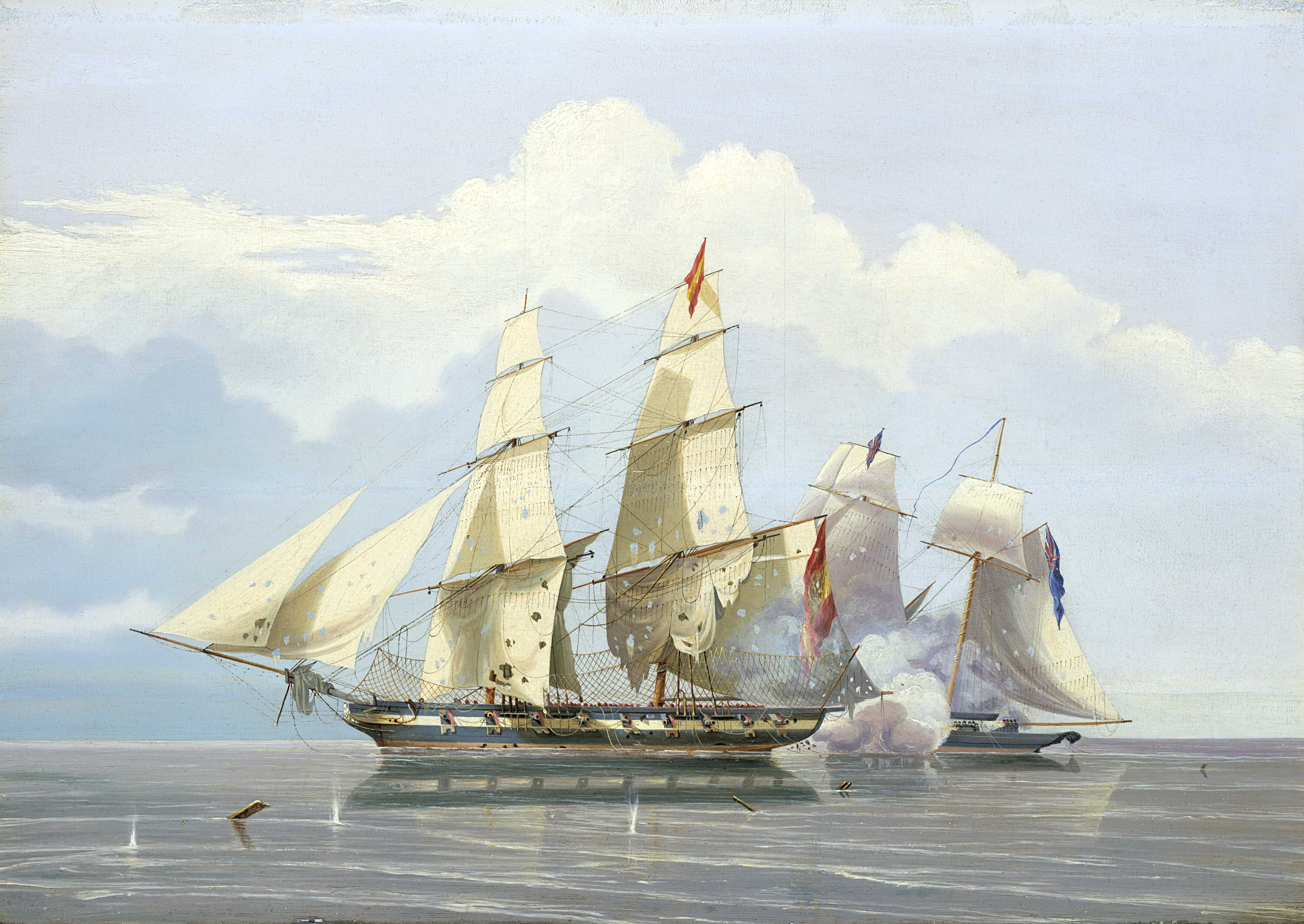
The capture of a slave ship by HMS Buzzard to free the slaves, 1834

The 1807 act's intention was to entirely outlaw the slave trade within the British Empire, but the lucrative trade continued through smuggling. Sometimes captains at risk of being caught by the Royal Navy would throw slaves into the sea to reduce their fines. Abolitionist Henry Brougham realized that trading would continue, and so as a new MP successfully introduced the Slave Trade Felony Act 1811. This law at last made slave trading a criminal felony throughout the empire, and for British subjects worldwide. This proved far more effective and ended the trade across the Empire, as the Royal Navy ruthlessly pursued slave ships. In 1827, Britain defined participation in the slave trade as piracy and punishable by death.

Between 1808 and 1860, the Royal Navy's West Africa Squadron seized approximately 1,600 slave ships and freed 150,000 Africans who were aboard. Britain used its influence to coerce other countries to agree to treaties to end their slave trade and allow the Royal Navy to seize their slave ships. Action was also taken against African leaders who refused to agree to British treaties to outlaw the trade. For example, the 1851 Reduction of Lagos deposed "the usurping King of Lagos". Britain signed anti-slavery treaties with more than 50 African rulers.

== Slavery Abolition Act 1833 ==
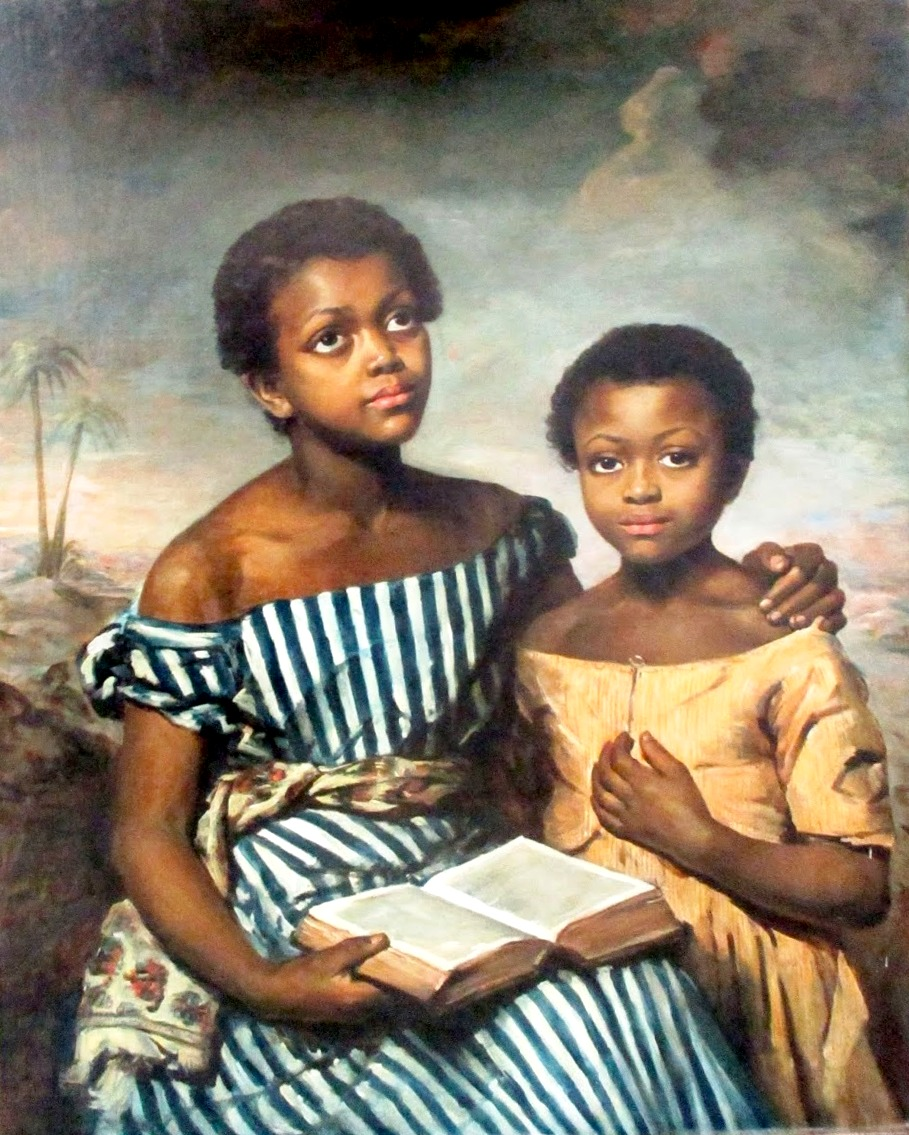
Abolitionist painting attributed to Emma Soyer, 1831

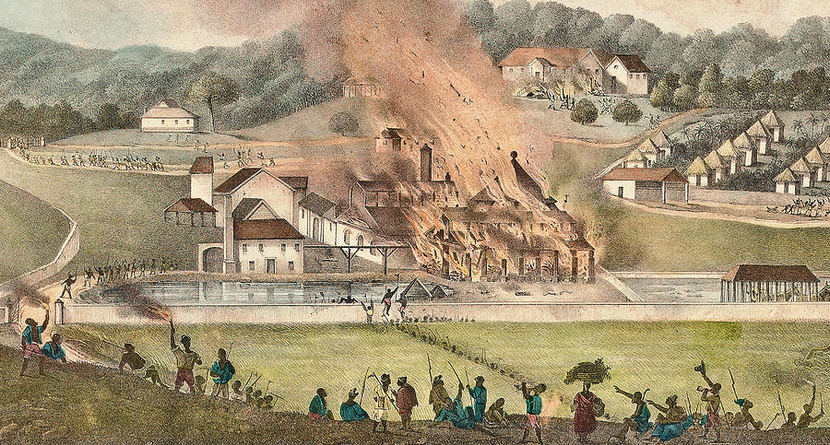
Destruction of the Roehampton Estate, January 1832, during the Jamaica slave revolt

After the Slave Trade Act 1807, slaves could still be held, though not sold, within the British Empire. In the 1820s, the abolitionist movement may have revived the campaign against the institution of slavery. In 1823 the first Anti-Slavery Society was founded in Britain. The society's members consisted of a union of non-conformist churches and many had previously campaigned against the slave trade. In 1831, enslaved man Sam Sharpe led the Christmas Rebellion (Baptist War) in Jamaica, an event that catalyzed anti-slavery sentiment. This combination of political pressure and popular uprisings convinced the British government that there was no longer any middle ground between slavery and emancipation.

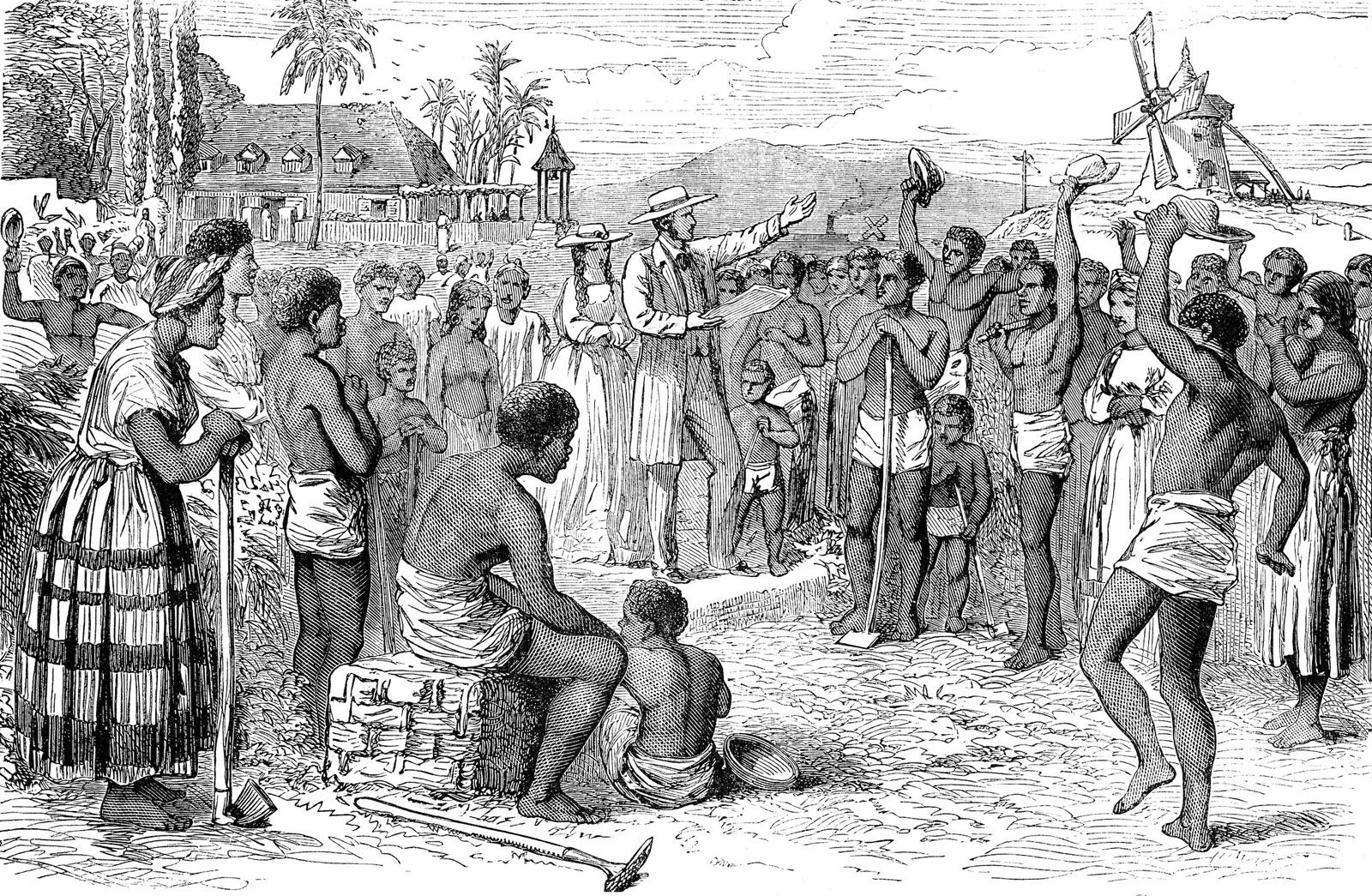
Enslaved people on a British plantation in the West Indies receiving news of their emancipation

On 28 August 1833, the Slavery Abolition Act 1833 received royal assent, paving the way for the abolition of slavery within the British Empire and its colonies. On 1 August 1834, all slaves in the British Empire (except for India) were emancipated, but they were indentured to their former owners in an apprenticeship system that meant gradual abolition: the first set of apprenticeships came to an end on 1 August 1838, while the final apprenticeships were scheduled to cease on 1 August 1840, two years later.

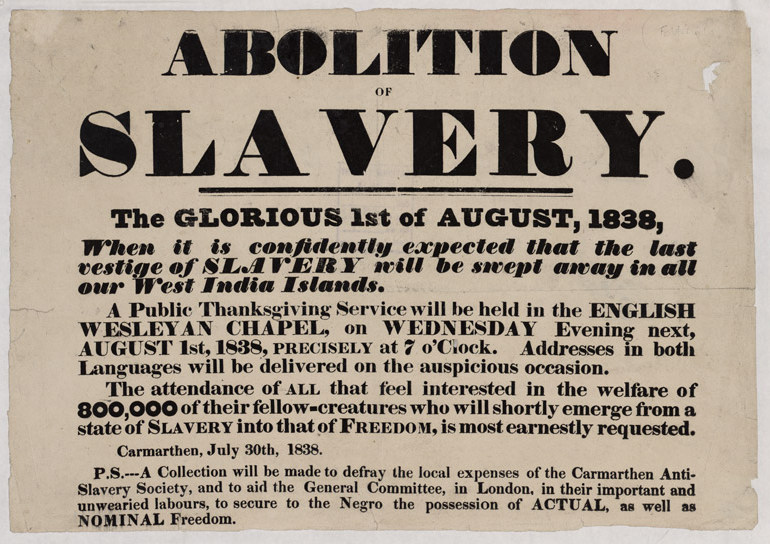
A poster advertising a special chapel service in celebration of the Abolition of Slavery in 1838

The apprenticeship system was deeply unpopular with slaves. On 1 August 1834, as the Governor in Port of Spain, Trinidad addressed an audience about the new laws, the mostly elderly, unarmed slaves began chanting: "Pas de six ans. Point de six ans" ("Not six years. No six years"), drowning out his voice. Peaceful protests continued until the government passed a resolution to abolish apprenticeship and the slaves gained de facto freedom. Full emancipation for all slaves was legally granted on 1 August 1838, ahead of schedule, making Trinidad the first British slave society to fully end slavery. The government set aside £20 million for compensation of slave owners for their "property" across the Empire, but it did not offer former slaves compensation or reparations. This was because abolitionists had not planned for much more than the long-awaited reform of the law, and felt that freedom along with the option of returning to Africa to live in Freetown, or the nearby state of Liberia, was infinitely preferable to continued chattel slavery.

In context, the £20 million voted by Parliament to compensate slave owners under the 1833 Act can be compared with the Gross Domestic Product of the UK in 1832, which was £443 million and government spending which was £51.5m.

== Women's participation ==
White British women participated to the abolitionist movement from the 1780s onwards. Many women supported local and national abolitionist societies, organized boycotts of slave-grown products—notably sugar, and wrote anti-slavery literature.

The first women's anti-slavery society in the UK, the Birmingham Ladies Society for the Relief of Negro Slaves (also known as Female Society for Birmingham) was founded in 1825. This association was created as an independent society, rather than as a local auxiliary of a national society; therefore, it acted more like a national society than a local one, and actively promoted the foundation of other female local societies throughout Britain: of the 73 female abolitionist societies created between 1825 and 1833, around 20 were founded under the influence of the Birmingham society. For historian Clare Midgley, the formation of these feminine groups “marked the change from abolition as an individual woman’s commitment, to antislavery as a collective female endeavour”, which had “major repercussions not only on the role of women in the movement but also on the nature of the abolitionist campaign as a whole and on the role of women in the British society”.

== Campaigning after the Act ==
"The Anti-Slavery Society Convention, 1840" by Benjamin Haydon (1841). An elderly Thomas Clarkson addresses a meeting of over 500 delegates.

In 1839, the British and Foreign Anti-Slavery Society was formed. At the time, Britain continued to import cotton and other commodities from the U.S. Deep South, which relied on slavery for cotton production, to fuel the spinning and weaving mills in Manchester and other northern cities. The finished goods furnished Britain's low-wage export manufacturing economy, with surpluses exported to Europe and India. London merchant banks made loans throughout the supply chain to planters, factors, warehousers, carters, shippers, spinners, weavers, and exporters.

In June 1840, London hosted the first World's Anti-Slavery Convention, at Exeter Hall. The invitation, sent by the British Foreign Anti-Slavery Society, stipulated the need to promote “this great and truly Christian object” of “hasten[ing] the utter extinction of the Slave-Trade”.

The British and Foreign Anti-Slavery Society campaigned to outlaw slavery in other countries, and pressured the British government to do more to enforce the suppression of the slave trade, by declaring slave traders to be pirates and pursuing them as such. The Society is in operation today as Anti-Slavery International, the world's oldest international human rights organisation, with its headquarters in London.

On 20 December 1841, the first multilateral treaty for the suppression of the slave trade, the Treaty for the Suppression of the African Slave Trade, was signed in London by the representatives of Austria, Britain, France, Prussia, and Russia. There was a treaty between Britain and the United States of America in 1862.

The Slave Trade Department was established in 1841, and was headed by the first superintendent, James Bandinel. It came to inherit its own staffing budget in 1841, and in 1854 it was finally recognised as a branch of the Foreign Office. Arguably, its alignment with the Foreign Office was "a tacit of acknowledgement that suppression was a gradual process, but revolution was imminent".

== See also ==
- List of Abolitionist Forerunners (by Thomas Clarkson)
- Slavery in the British Isles
- Slavery in the British and French Caribbean
- Slavery in the British Virgin Islands
- Abolitionism in the United States
- Abolitionism in France
