= Igshaan Adams =

South African textile artist (born 1982)

- Born: 1982 (age 43–44); Cape Town, South Africa
- Education: Ruth Prowse School of Art in Cape Town, South Africa.
- Occupation: Visual artist
- Known for: Textile art, tapestry, installation art
- Awards: 2018 Standard Bank Young Artist Award for Visual Art

Igshaan Adams (born 1982) is a South African artist working on tapestries and textile-based sculptures, installations, and performance. His work has been included in the 59th Venice Biennale: The Milk of Dreams, in 2022; and the 2023 São Paulo Biennial: Choreographies of the Impossible.

== Early life ==
Igshaan Adams was born in 1982, in Cape Town, South Africa. He grew up in the suburb of Bonteheuwel, located on the Cape Flats southeast of Cape Town. Bonteheuwel was a segregated site and created in apartheid-South Africa era of racial segregation for residents of multiracial communities.

=== Education ===
Igshaan Adams attended Ruth Prowse School of Art in Cape Town, South Africa. He studied traditional art using analog materials, such as charcoal, oil on canvas, etc. At school, he was encouraged to pursue other media, which inspired his pursuit of textile and tapestry art.

=== Religion ===
Igshaan Adams was born to a Muslim father and a Christian mother, and he was raised by his Christian grandparents. Igshaan's art is influenced by his religious upbringing, sexuality, and apartheid. One of his exhibitions, Kicking Dust, has numerous artworks influenced by Muslim prayer rugs.

=== Sexuality ===
Adams struggled with the conflict associated between his homosexuality and his paternal religion of Islam. He practised abstinence for two years in an attempt to balance the two estranged identities. The pursuit of his religious integrality being present in his pursuit of art opposes the narratives that seek to separate gay identity and religion as a means to be free from religious and sexual persecution.

== Career ==
Adams creates large-scale tapestries, wall and floor installations made of plastic, fabric, textile, and other everyday materials such washcloths and garden fencing. Much of their work is informed by childhood memories, family relationships, the house they grew up in and the surrounding community.

=== Exhibitions ===
In 2019, his work was included in the group show In This Imperfect Present Moment at the Seattle Art Museum.

Igshaan Adams's first solo exhibition in the United States, Getuie, took place at the SCAD Museum of Art, at the School of Art and Design, Savannah, in 2020. For the show, the artist used linoleum flooring removed from working-class houses in Cape Town in his installation.

The solo exhibition Igshaan Adams: Desire Lines was on view at Art Institute of Chicago, Illinois, in 2022. The mid-career retrospective gathered artworks produced since 2014 to the present, and an accompanying monographic catalog was published by the museum.

Adams work was included in the 59th Venice Biennale (2022), Milk of Dreams, curated by Cecilia Alemani. His first solo show in continental Europe Igshaan Adams: Kicking Dust was presented at the Kunsthalle Zürich, and covered topics such as landscape, architecture, human relations and sexuality.

In 2023, Adams participated in the São Paulo Art Biennial, Brazil, for the first time. Their work is going to be showcased next to international artists such as Torkwase Dyson, Ellen Gallagher, Elizabeth Catlett, Trinh T. Minh-ha, Wifredo Lam, Dayanita Singh, and Deborah Anzinger, among many others.

Most recent presentations of Adams work includes Lynloop, a monumental installation commissioned for the lobby at the Institute of Contemporary Art, Boston, Massachusetts, in 2024. Using Google Earth imagery to ground his work, the installation is a representation of the footpaths between a sports field and a social space in the town of Heideveld, Cape Town.

In 2024, his solo show Igshaan Adams: Weerhoud took place at the Hepworth Wakefield museum, in West Yorkshire.

In 2025, Adams debuted a show, Igshaan Adams: I've been here all along, I've been waiting, at the Hill Art Foundation.

=== Collections ===
Igshaan Adams work is featured in the collection of the Pérez Art Museum Miami, Florida; the Art Institute of Chicago, Illinois, and the Minneapolis Institute of Art (MIA), Minnesota.

=== Awards ===
In 2018 he was the winner of the Standard Bank Young Artist Award for Visual Art in South Africa. Adams was awarded an artist-in-residence program by the Zeitz MOCAA, South Africa.
