= Cosmo Whyte =

Jamaican-born American artist (b. 1982)

- Born: 1982 (age 42–43); Saint Andrew Parish, Jamaica
- Education: Bennington College (BFA), Maryland Institute College of Art, University of Michigan (MFA)
- Occupation(s): Visual artist, educator
- Known for: Sculpture, installation art, drawing, painting
- Awards: Tiffany Foundation Award (2019)
- Website: www.cosmowhyte.com

Cosmo Whyte (born 1982) is a Jamaican-born American visual artist and educator. His is known for work in sculpture, drawing, painting, and installation art, which often address his Caribbean heritage and topics such as racism, colonialism, migration, and police brutality. Whyte lives in Los Angeles, California, and teaches at the University of California, Los Angeles (UCLA).

== Early life and education ==
Cosmo Whyte was born in 1982, in Saint Andrew Parish, Jamaica. He started drawing at a young age. In 2001, he moved to the United States.

Whyte received a BFA degree in 2001 from Bennington College in Vermont; followed by study at a postbaccalaureate program at Maryland Institute College of Art; and a MFA degree in 2015 from the Penny W. Stamps School of Art and Design at University of Michigan.

== Career ==
Whyte teaches in the School of the Arts and Architecture at the University of California, Los Angeles, since September 2022. He previously taught at Florida State University, and Morehouse College.

His solo exhibitions have included The Sea Urchin Can't Swim: Tales from the Edge of a World (2024) at Johnson Lowe Gallery in Atlanta, Georgia; Hush Now, Don't Explain (2023) at Anat Ebgi Gallery in Los Angeles, California; and Beneath Its Tongue, The Fish Rolls The Hook To Sharpen Its Cadence (2019–2020) at the Museum of Contemporary Art of Georgia in Atlanta, Georgia.

He is s recipient of The Louis Comfort Tiffany Foundation Award (2019), and the Art Matters Award (2019) from the Art Matters Foundation.

Whyte's artwork is in museum collections, including at the High Museum of Art in Atlanta, Georgia; the Museum of Contemporary Art Georgia in Atlanta, Georgia; the National Gallery of Jamaica in Kingston, Jamaica; and the Pérez Art Museum Miami in Miami, Florida.

== Exhibitions ==
=== Solo exhibitions ===
- 2019–2020, Beneath Its Tongue, The Fish Rolls The Hook To Sharpen Its Cadence, Museum of Contemporary Art of Georgia, Atlanta, Georgia, U.S.
- 2023, Hush Now, Don't Explain, Anat Ebgi Gallery, Los Angeles, California, U.S.
- 2024, The Sea Urchin Can't Swim: Tales from the Edge of a World, Johnson Lowe Gallery, Atlanta, Georgia, U.S.

=== Group exhibitions ===
- 2012, Outward Reach: 9 Jamaican Photography and New Media Artists, Art Museum of the Americas, Washington, D.C., U.S.
- 2017, Jamaica National Biennial, National Gallery of Jamaica, Kingston, Jamaica
- 2019, Get Up, Stand Up Now, Somerset House, London, England
- 2020, 13th Havana Biennial, Matanzas, Cuba
- 2022, This Tender Fragile Thing, Jack Shainman Gallery, New York City, New York
- 2025, Black and Gold: Stories Untold, For-Site Foundation, Fort Point National Historic Site, San Francisco, California; artists included are Whyte, Akea Brionne, Demetri Broxton, Adrian L. Burrell, Adam Davis, Cheryl Derricotte, Carla Edwards, Mildred Howard, Isaac Julien, Tiff Massey, Umar Rashid, Trina Michelle Robinson, Alison Saar, Yinka Shonibare, Bryan Keith Thomas, and Hank Willis Thomas

== See also ==
- List of Jamaican artists
