= Panteha Abareshi =

Canadian-American artist

- پانته‌آ ابارشی
- Born: 1999 (age 26–27); Montreal, Quebec, Canada
- Education: University of Southern California
- Occupation: conceptual visual artist
- Notable work: For Medical Use Only (2019), NOT A BODY (2021), FETISH MATERIAL (2023), OBJECT dESIRE (2024)
- Website: www.panteha.com

Panteha Abareshi (Persian: پانته‌آ ابارشی; born 1999) is a Canadian-born American multidisciplinary artist and curator, primarily working within installation art, video art, and performance art. They are of Jamaican and Iranian descent, and their work is about chronic illness and disability. Abareshi is based in Los Angeles, California. Abareshi identifies with the pronouns they/them/theirs.

== Early life ==
Panteha Abareshi was born in 1999 in Montreal, Quebec, Canada; and raised in Tucson, Arizona. Abareshi's mother is Jamaican and their father is Iranian; they were primarily raised by their single father. Abareshi was born with the genetic blood disorder, Sickle cell zero beta thalassemia which causes chronic pain and more pain as they age. Their blood disorder was diagnosed at age two. Abareshi identifies with the pronouns they/them/theirs.

== Education ==
Abareshi attended the University of Southern California (USC) in the Roski School of Art and Design. At USC, Jennifer West has served as a mentor and teacher.

Abareshi uses the experience of chronic illness to examine concepts of medical violence, representation, materialness, and more. Abareshi's video work, For Medical Use Only (2019) has been influential for artist Carolyn Lazard.

In January 2020, Abareshi was on the cover of Bitch Magazine (spring 2020, 86 issue). In spring 2020, they published the art book, Panteha Abareshi: I Am Inside the Body (published by Sming Sming Books). Abareshi was awarded the 2021 VSA Emerging Artists Competition, by the Kennedy Center.

== Exhibitions ==
- 2017 – The Body As Site Of, group exhibition, Lippitt House at Brown University, Providence, Rhode Island
- 2020 – Art4Equality x Life, Liberty & The Pursuit of Happiness, group exhibition, Brooklyn, New York City, New York Abareshi's work was part of the 2020 Art4Equality x Life, Liberty & The Pursuit of Happiness, public art exhibition with a public billboard located at Park Ave and Emerson Place in Brooklyn.
- 2020 – Shape Open 2020: The Future is Loading (Part II), Shape Arts, London, England
- 2021 – Panteha Abareshi: Tender Calamities, solo exhibition, Los Angeles Municipal Art Gallery (LAMAG), Los Angeles, California Their first major solo exhibition, Panteha Abareshi: Tender Calamities was at the Los Angeles Municipal Art Gallery in 2021, during the COVID-19 pandemic in the United States.
- 2021 - Well/Being: An Exhibition on Healing and Repair, August 4 - December 11, 2021 Artists, Installation Views, Public Programs, About.” Well/Being: An Exhibition on Healing and Repair - Aug 4 - Dec 11, 2021 University Art Museum. Accessed February 26, 2025. https://archive.universityartmuseum.org/wellbeing/abareshi.html
- 2023 - INVALID PLEASURES, solo exhibition, Kunsthall Trondheim, Trondheim, Norway. Abareshi's first major solo exhibition outside the U.S.

== Filmography ==
- Infanticide (2018), performance based video
- Not Better Yet (2019), Super 8 and VHS film
- For Medical Use Only (2019), 8 mm and hi8 film
- For Parts (2020), VHS video

== See also ==
- List of Jamaican artists
- List of Iranian artists
