= Thomas Craskell =

British painter

Thomas Craskell (died 1790) was a British engineer and painter active in Jamaica during the eighteenth century.

He was a military engineer for much of his life. He was a lieutenant in the Engineer Corps among the troops Major-General Peregrine Hopson led in the invasions of Martinique and Guadeloupe in early 1759. His career as a marine painter involved working alongside Peter Monamy and Samuel Scott in the mid-eighteenth century. Craskell was familiar with naval technology, and showed precise rendering of sails and rigging in his paintings. There are only four known works by Craskell; two of these are in the National Maritime Museum, Greenwich, London.

In 1758, he started the supervision of the King's House in Spanish Town.

His son, also called Thomas Craskell, was a captain in the army who was appointed superintendent general of the Maroons to replace Major John James.

== Survey of Jamaica ==
From 1756 to 1761 he worked with James Simpson in conducting a survey of Jamaica that resulted in three maps which could be combined to create an overall map 90 x 38 inches in size.

Cornwall

Middlesex

Surrey

== Paintings ==
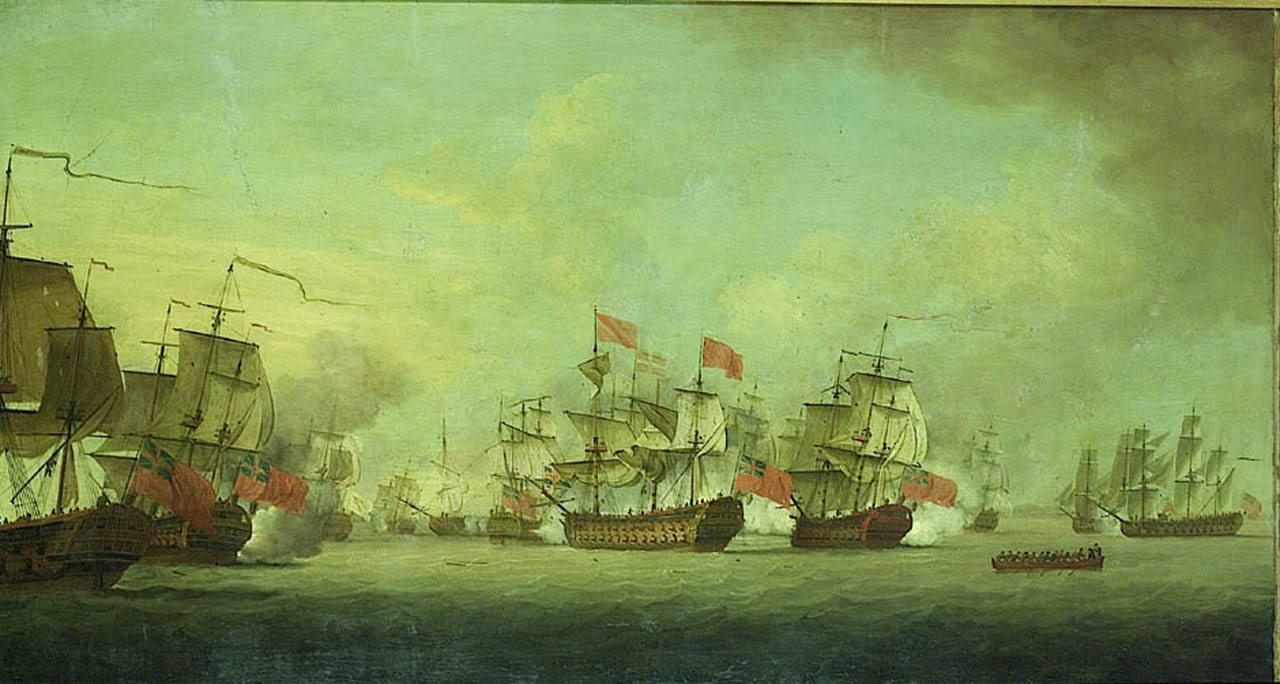
Knowles' Action, the Battle of Havana 1948, painted 1753

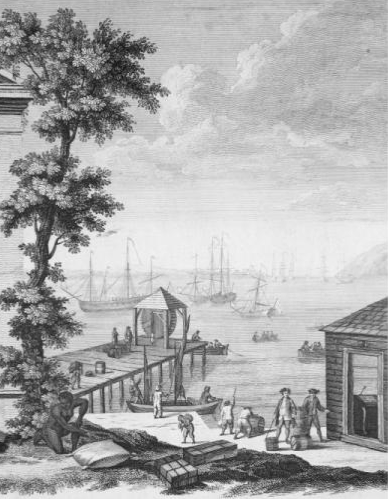
Illustration to map of Surrey, Jamaica, 1763
