= Richard Nattoo =

Jamaican visual artist

- Born: Richard Nattoo; 1993 (age 32–33); Spanish Town, Jamaica
- Education: University of Technology, Jamaica
- Occupation: Visual artist
- Website: richardnattoo.com

Richard Nattoo (born 1993) is a Jamaican visual artist.

== Biography ==
Richard Nattoo was born in Spanish Town, Jamaica, in 1993. He received his early education from Ardenne High School in Kingston. He pursued his studies in architecture at the University of Technology, Jamaica. Later, he transitioned to a career as an artist.

Richard has showcased his work in several exhibitions at the National Gallery of Jamaica, including the Jamaica Biennial (2014, 2017), Young Talent (2015), Digital (2016), and the Summer Exhibition (2019). He has also held solo exhibitions titled Reverberation of the Silent Echo (2014), Fragility (2019), Fragility Part 2 (2019), Existential, Salvation II – The Beautiful Depression, and When My Father Took Us Fishing.

His primary mediums are watercolors, pen and ink on canvas. Nattoo currently resides and works in Kingston.

== The Rabbit, The Wanderer and The Majician ==
Richard's work explores the transition from childhood to adulthood, in a Westernized society, exploring the loss of childhood and forgotten majic. It chronicles the journey of three central characters: the Wanderer, a Rabbit, and a Majician—the latter being a young boy named Ian.

The Wanderer symbolizes Richard's personal journey towards maturity, grappling with a newfound sense of numbness and detachment. This emotional void leads to an encounter with the Rabbit, who in turn introduces him to the Majician. Together, they traverse a forest, seeking wisdom from their ancestors to rediscover the innocence and passion of youth.

== Awards and recognition ==
- 2020: Prime Minister Youth Award (Arts and Culture)
- 2022: Winner of the Reimagine Nanny Competition
- 2023: Fellow at the Noldor Artist Residency, Ghana
