= Roehampton Estate =

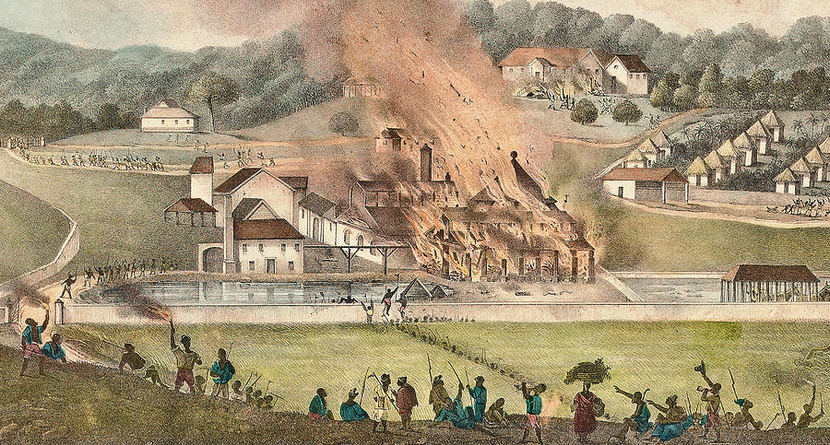
Destruction of the Roehampton Estate January 1832, by Adolphe Duperly

Roehampton Estate was a plantation in St James Parish, Jamaica. It was the scene of substantial destruction during the Baptist War (1831-2).

The estate was owned by John Baillie, an absentee plantation owner who lived in Montagu Square, London. Following his death in October 1832, his estate received £5745 0s 3d under the Compensation act for the emancipation of 322 enslaved Africans.

In 1850, Isaac Jackson bought the estate.

== See also ==
- List of plantations in Jamaica
