= Isaac Mendes Belisario =

Jamaican artist, lithographer, and painter (1795–1849)

- Born: 1795; Kingston, Jamaica
- Died: 1849 (aged 53–54); London, England
- Education: Robert Hills
- Known for: Painter, printmaker, lithographer

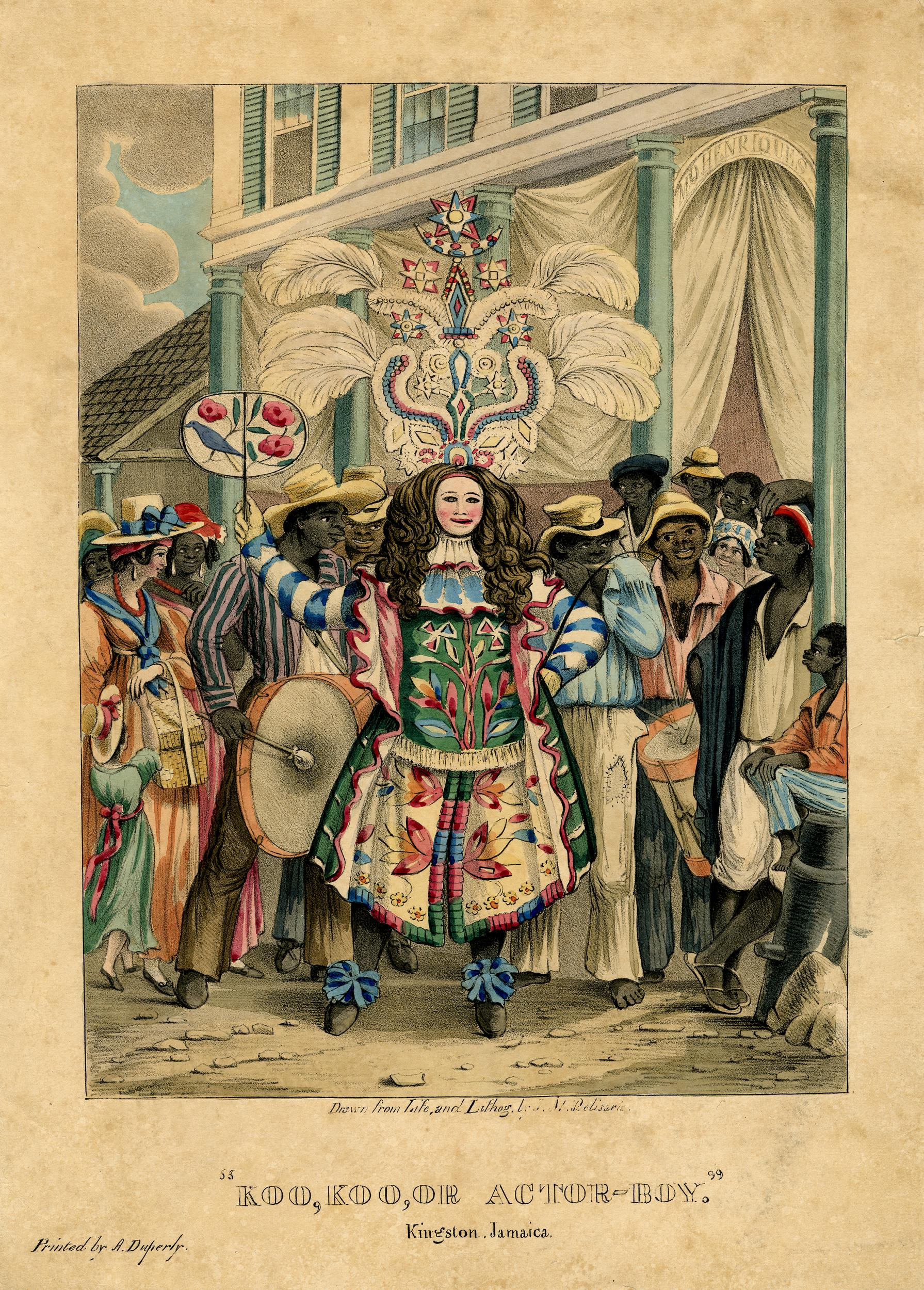
Koo Koo, or Actor-Boy From Sketches of Character, In Illustration of the Habits, Occupations, and Costume of the Negro Population in the Island of Jamaica, 1837–38, hand-painted lithographic print

Isaac Mendes Belisario (1795–1849) was a Jamaican-born artist, lithographer, and painter of Sephardic Jewish descent. He is best known for his 1837–38 series Sketches of Character, In Illustration of the Habits, Occupation, and Costume of the Negro Population in the Island of Jamaica, which documented Afro-Caribbean life in early post-emancipation Jamaica.

== Early life and career ==
Belisario was born in Kingston, Jamaica, in 1795 to two established Sephardic Jewish families of Portuguese descent, Mendes Belisario and Lindo. His grandfather, Alexandre Lindo, engaged in the slave trade, however, his father, Abraham Mendes Belisario, became one of the leading abolitionists in Tortola. He spent much of his youth in London, where he studied with English landscape painter Robert Hills between 1815 and 1818.

Although he exhibited at the Royal Academy in 1831, Belisario worked primarily as a stockbroker in England before returning to Jamaica around 1832. His move coincided with the Jamaican Assembly’s passage of the Jewish Emancipation Act, which granted Jews full civil rights six months after free people of colour had received similar rights, and shortly before the Slavery Abolition Act of 1833. In Kingston, he opened a portrait studio where he painted in oils as well as doing his watercolour work and lithography; he also painted estate views and collaborated with lithographer Adolphe Duperly on several projects.

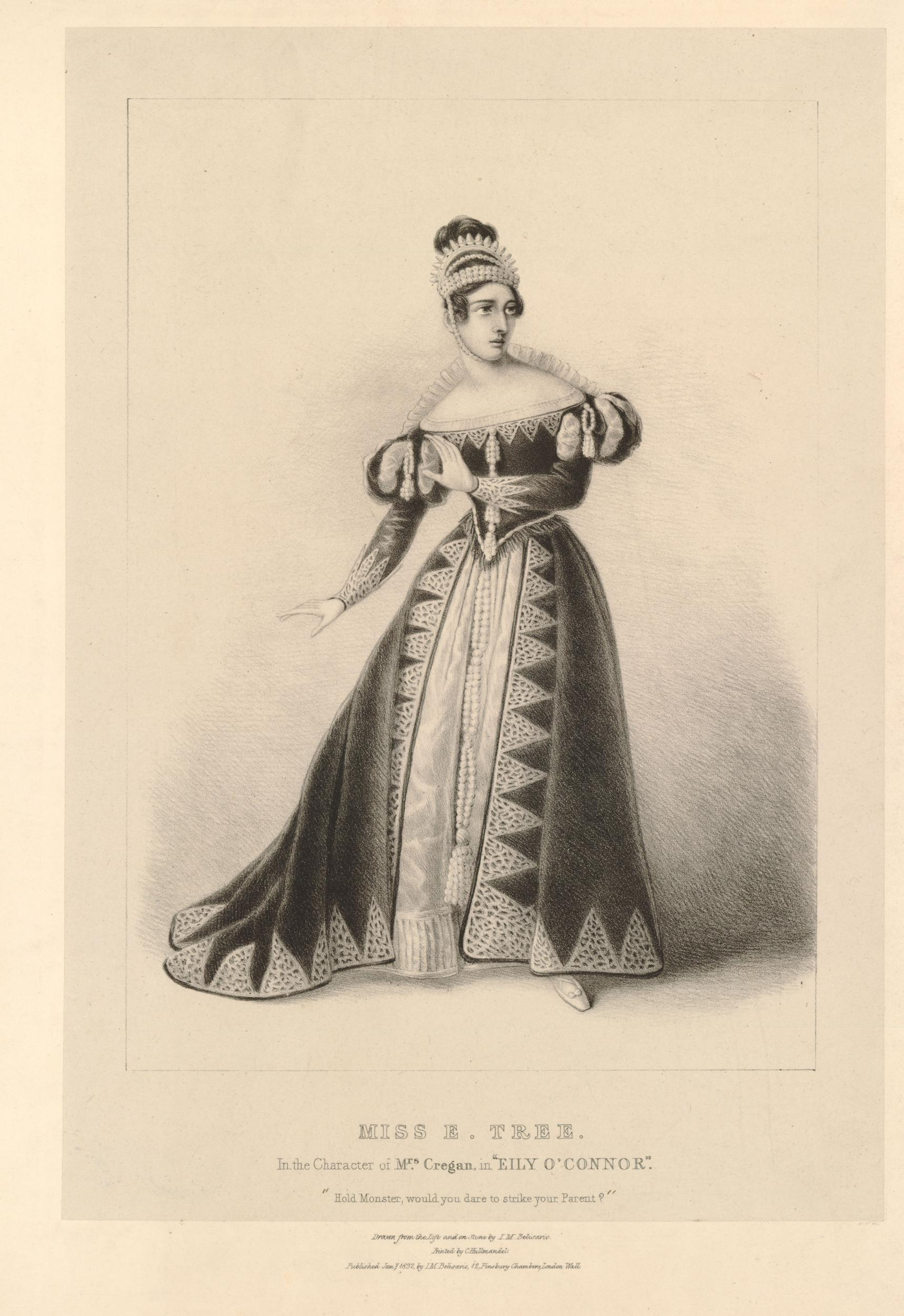
Portrait of actress Ellen Kean in Renaissance-style costume. Lithograph on chine collé 1832

The last known works he produced in Kingston date from 1846. Belisario died in London in 1849.

== Sketches of Character ==
Belisario’s best-known work, Sketches of Character (1837–38), is a hand-coloured lithographic series depicting the "habits, occupations, and costume" of Jamaica’s Black population in the years between the abolition of slavery (1833) and the end of the interim apprenticeship system (1838). The series includes depictions of Jonkonnu masquerade characters—such as the Koo Koo or Actor Boy, Queen, and Red Set Girls—as well as everyday occupations like chimney sweepers, milkwoman, and water-jar sellers.

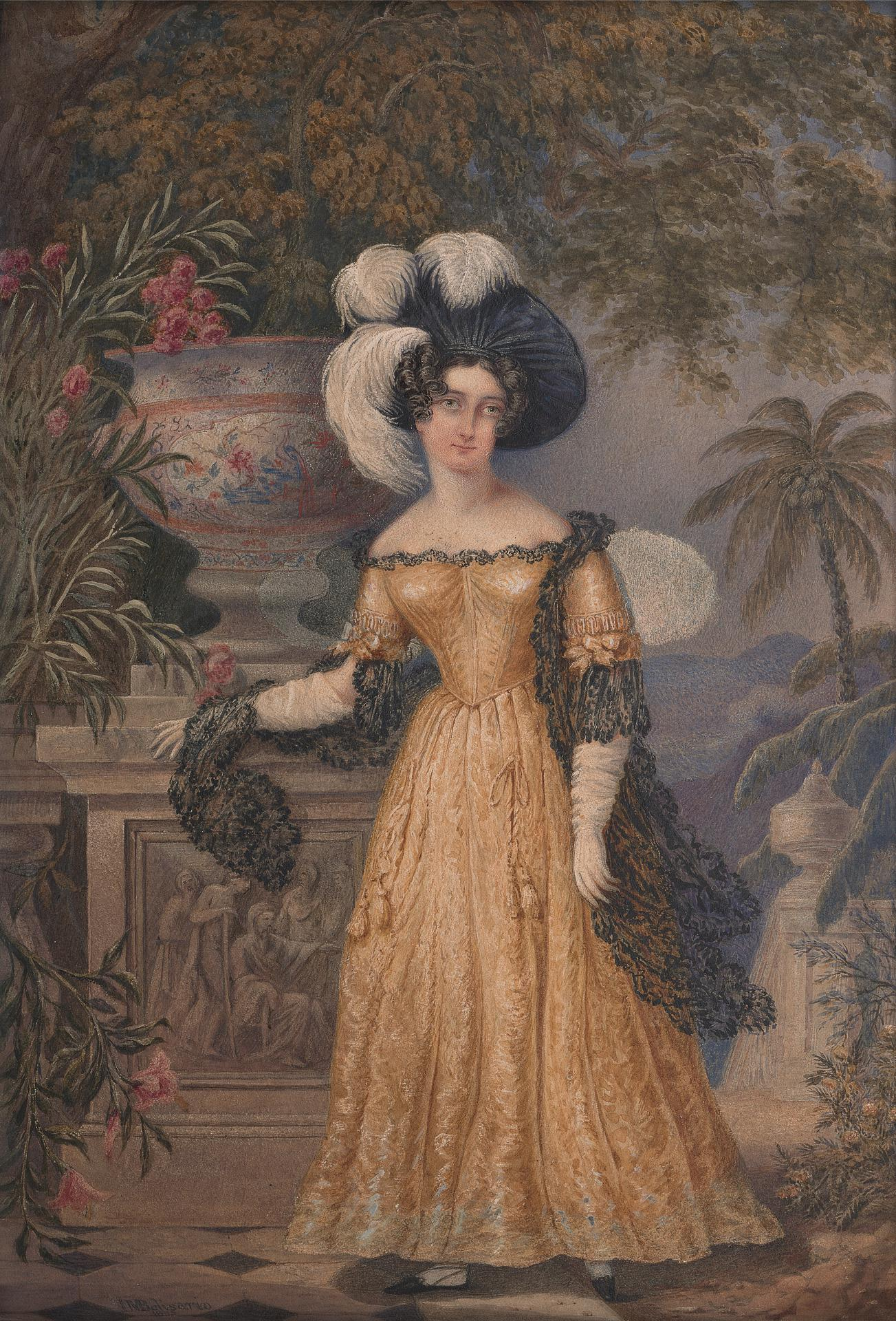
Portrait of Lady Frances Rowe. Watercolour and gouache 1835

=== Artistic influences and style ===
The carnival scenes in Sketches blend African and European costume traditions. For example, the “Red Set Girls and Jack in the Green” lithograph depicts women in stylized European dresses of the early 1830s alongside a figure in a full palm-frond costume, recalling both English May Day celebrations and West African Egungun and Zangbeto traditions.

Belisario also drew on British visual precedents such as the Cries of London prints for his “Cries of Kingston” series. His portrayal of “Lovey,” a Congolese-born puppeteer and vendor, demonstrates both sympathy and caricature, reflecting tensions between ethnographic documentation and racial stereotyping.

In addition, the work has been cited as an example of Jewish diaspora art, as well as French art because of Duperly's contributions.

=== Critical reception and modern scholarship ===
Modern art historians have noted the ambivalence of Sketches of Character. While some carnival depictions convey vibrancy and cultural richness, other images—such as “Creole Negroes” and the portrait of Lovey—draw on the language and visual conventions of contemporary racist and ethnological publications. Comparisons have been made to Richard Bridgens’s West India Scenery (1836), which expressed overtly pro-slavery views; Belisario’s work does not explicitly support or oppose slavery but reproduces certain colonial attitudes.

Scholars argue that Belisario’s position as a white-passing but socially marginalised Jew in colonial Jamaica may have informed both his attraction to Jonkonnu’s boundary-crossing performances and his reluctance to alienate elite, Christian patrons. His commercial connections with Jewish merchants, who historically supplied costume materials for Jonkonnu and other festivities, are evident in details such as the inclusion of Moses Q. Henriques’s shop in the “Koo Koo, or Actor Boy” lithograph.

== Other works ==
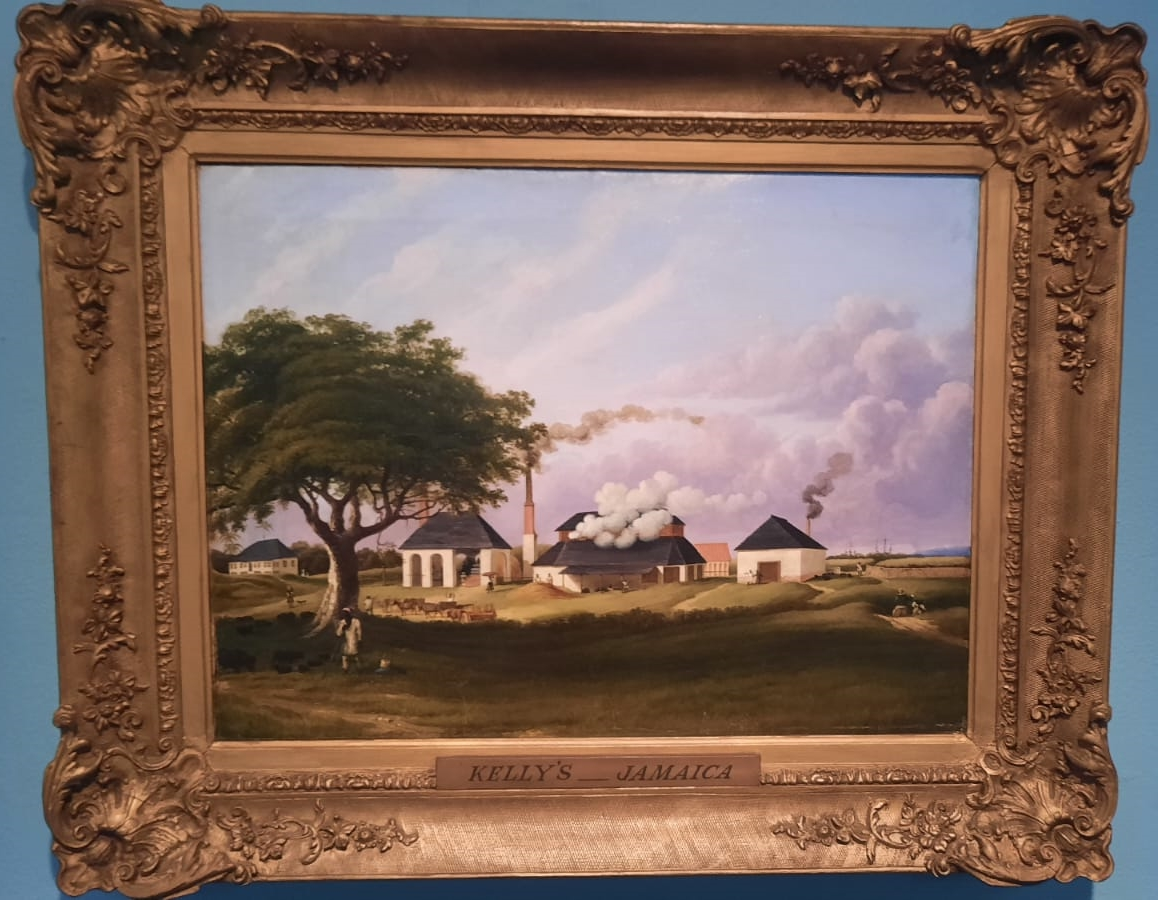
Kelly Estate 1840

In addition to Sketches of Character, Belisario produced landscapes and portraits for Jamaica’s planter elite, including works for the Marquess of Sligo and Chief Justice Joshua Rowe. These paintings often adopted the English picturesque style, portraying plantations as idyllic landscapes with distant Black labourers, a view far removed from the realities of post-emancipation labour conditions.

== Legacy ==
Belisario's work is considered an important visual record of Jamaican life through the lens of the Sephardic merchant class in the 1830s. Sketches of Character offers rare documentation of Afro-Jamaican masquerade traditions but also reflects the racial hierarchies and biases of its time, while his landscape and plantation work offers a chronicle of a time of profound change in the social and economic systems of colonial Jamaica. Today, the Sketches series is held in collections including the Yale Center for British Art and is frequently discussed in scholarship on colonial visual culture, emancipation, and Jewish diasporic history.
