= Ebony Patterson =

Jamaican-born visual artist and educator (born 1981)

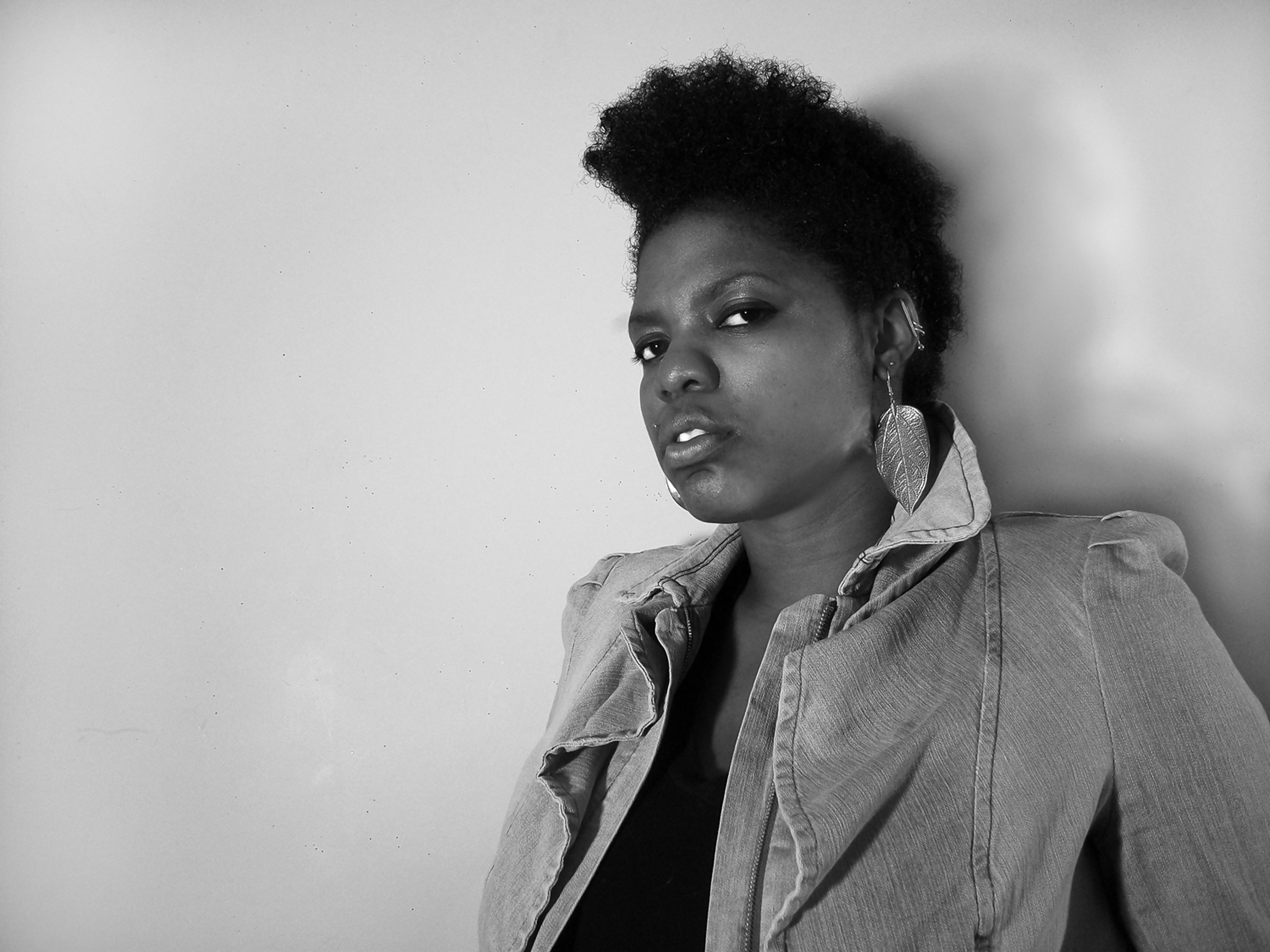
- Patterson in 2010
- Born: Ebony Grace Patteron; 1981 (age 44–45); Kingston, Jamaica
- Education: Edna Manley College of Visual and Performing Arts; Washington University in St. Louis
- Website: http://ebonygpatterson.com/

Ebony Grace Patterson (born 1981, Kingston, Jamaica) is a Jamaican-born visual artist and educator. She is known for her large and colorful tapestries created out of various materials such as, glitter, sequins, fabric, toys, beads, faux flowers, jewelry, and other embellishments. Her "Gangstas for Life series" of dancehall portraits, and her garden-inspired installations.

She has taught at the University of Virginia, Edna Manley College School of Visual and Performing Arts, and has been an Associate Professor in Painting and Mixed Media at the University of Kentucky since 2007. Her work has been shown in numerous solo and group exhibitions in Jamaica, the United States, and abroad.

In 2024, Patterson will co-curate the 6th edition of arts triennial Prospect New Orleans, and the first artist to do so.

== Early life and education ==
Patterson was born in 1981, Kingston, Jamaica. She studied painting at Edna Manley College of Visual and Performing Arts in Kingston, Jamaica and graduated in 2004. Patterson received an MFA degree in 2006 in printmaking and drawing from the Sam Fox School of Design & Visual Arts at Washington University in St. Louis.

== Work ==
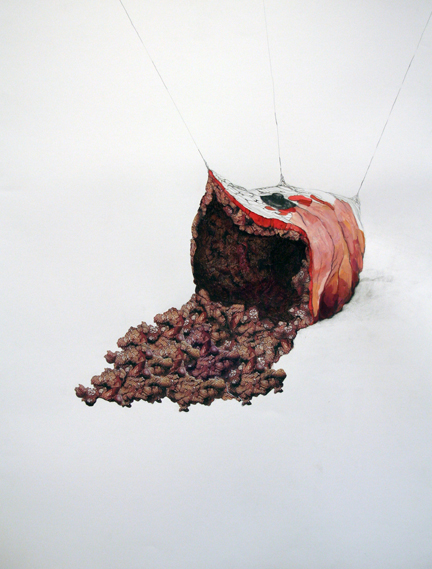
Untitled I (2007), from the Hybrid Series, mixed media drawing on paper.

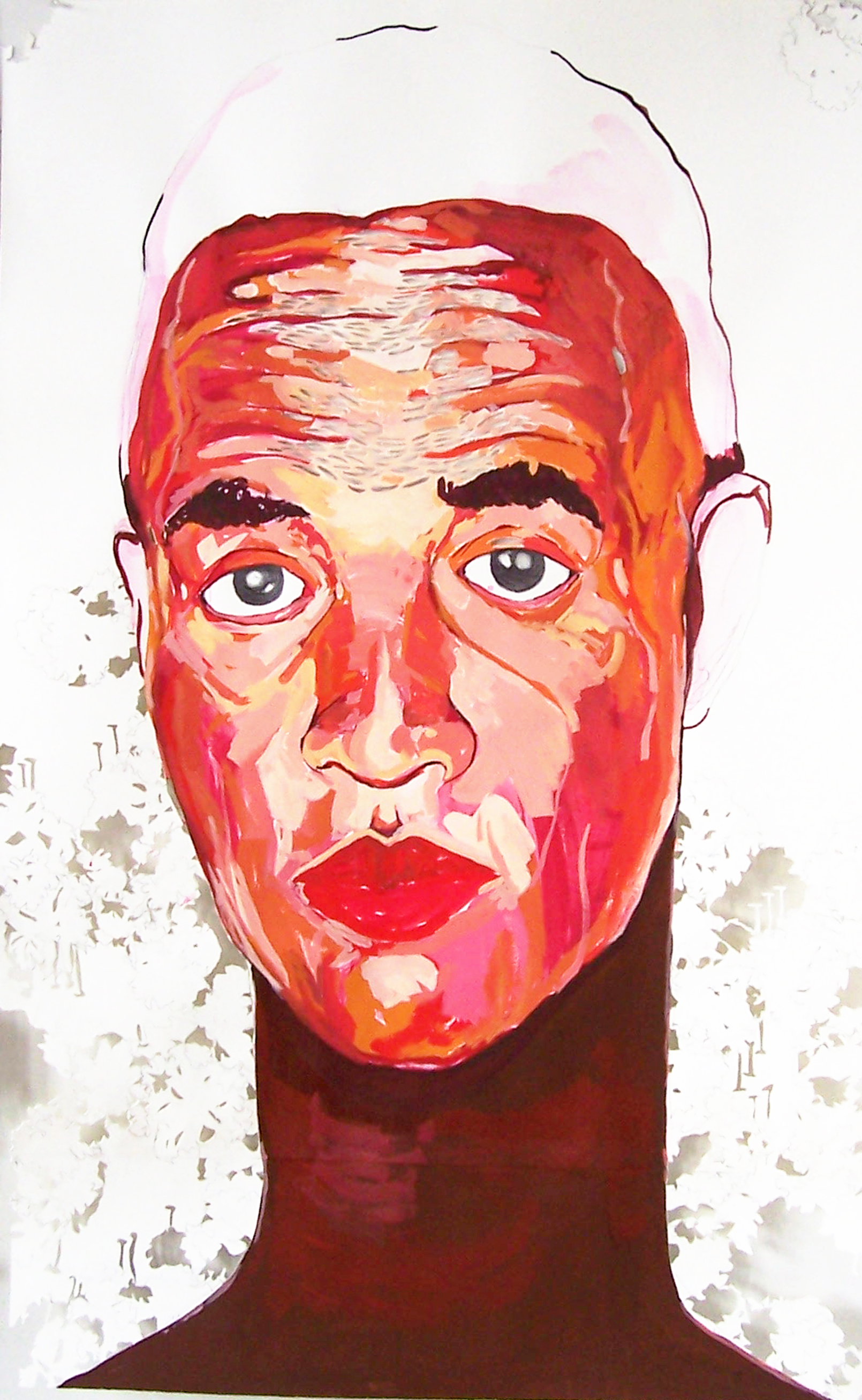
Untitled II (2007), from the Gangstas for Life Series, mixed media on hand-cut paper.

Patterson's early work often revolves around questions of identity and the body and takes the form of mixed media paintings, drawings and collages, most of them on paper. Photography, found objects, installation and performance have recently become increasingly important in her practice. Early work was primarily concerned with the female body as object. Her Venus Investigations objectified the female torso, headless and anonymous, and explored the relationship between the ample-bodied "Venus" or female goddess images of prehistoric times and contemporary female self-images and beauty ideals. Subsequent works more provocatively focused on the vagina as an object and, by implication, examined the taboos that surround this body part and its functions within Jamaican culture. This also led to 3-dimensional constructions made from intimate female articles such as sanitary napkins and tampons and more abstracted and surreal hybrid organic forms that appeared in her large paper collages of 2007. This early body of work has a sober and at times even majestic visual beauty which as she puts it, references "beauty through the use of the grotesque but visceral, confrontational and deconstructed." Patterson's artwork often addresses social and political issues related to feminism, violence, gender identity, and sexuality. Her work has been exhibited at art galleries around the world and has been critically acclaimed for its powerful messages.

Patterson's 2016 solo show at the Museum of Arts and Design, Dead Treez, incorporated several appliquéd commercially-woven Jacquard weavings in which Patterson used restaged images of photographs that had been taken of murder victims in Jamaica and then circulated on social media. The exhibition also included a collection of mannequins in vibrant Jamaican dance hall wear (titled Swag Swag Krew), and a series of vitrines with artificial flora and jewelry belonging to the collection of the Museum of Arts and Design and in which patterned bodies reclined (titled ...buried again to carry on growing...), again referencing the victims of violent crime.

Her solo exhibition Ebony G. Patterson...while the dew is still on the roses...organized by and presented at the Pérez Art Museum Miami in 2018 gathered a number of artworks including drawings, tapestries, and sculptures that feature glitter, appliqués, pins, embellishments, fabric, tassels, brooches, pearls, and beads. On the occasion, a monograph was published to celebrate the artist's production.

In 2018, Patterson was invited to participate in the first edition of Open Spaces, a series of installations, performances, and talks in Kansas City, Missouri. Her installation ...called up focused on one of two public pools in Swope Park. She ran a Kickstarter campaign to "reclaim and revitalize" the site dedicated to Dr. Harry M. Gilkey, who used the pool in 1956 to teach hydrotherapy to youth with physical handicaps. Patterson describes the site in the Kickstarter campaign, noting:

I want to better honor this history by taking down the fence, cleaning the space, and creating a work here. I also want to ask what it means to memorialize not just a site that was already memorialized, but also to embellish a site that is already embellished. What does it mean to give presence and meaning to a space that has been essentially unheard of? How do we reclaim what is meant for the collective? These are questions I want to pose not only for the exhibition but also for the community who once used it and will now use it again, and learn from what they have to say.

Patterson further elaborated after the work was complete, noting, "I am very interested in how regular people claim space and that's what street side memorials do. So when a tragedy happens, they mark the space by adding things that we would associate with a memorial in the same way that we're seeing here so there are flowers, there are toys, there are candles." The work was received positively by those who frequently visit Swope Park.

Patterson has held the first immersive artistic residency at the New York Botanical Garden, resulting in the 2023 exhibition "…things come to thrive…in the shedding…in the molting…".

=== Gangstas for Life series (2008 – ongoing) ===
One of Patterson's most recognized body of work is a series entitled "Gangstas for Life," which explores conceptions of masculinity within Dancehall culture. In this series, the artist specifically explores skin bleaching as a means of marking and transformation, not as an act of racial self-loathing. Additionally the series "seeks to examine the dichotomy between Jamaican stereotypical ideologies of homosexual practices and its parallels within dancehall culture." Red floral and fish motifs throughout the series serve to represent homosexuality within a predominantly homophobic culture. Patterson's images imaginatively recreate portraits of young black males who bleach their skin, pluck their eyebrows and wear 'bling' jewelry to enhance their gangsta status. Patterson finds beauty in their psychic violence glamorizing them with glittered halos and luscious lipstick. The artist explores perceptions of beauty as grotesque within the series, and her portrayal of the subjects' cracked, bleeding and oozing skin. She has said about this series:

Beauty, gender, [the] body and the grotesque are an ongoing discussion in my work. I am enthralled by the repulsive, the bizarre and the objectness of bodies and the contradictions that both have to art - historically and culturally. The Jamaican vernacular, gendered cultural symbolisms and stereotypes serve as a platform for these discussions. I am enthused by words, conditions and experiences that objectify and abjectify.

== Awards and Honors ==
In 2023, the High Museum of Art awarded Patterson its David C. Driskell Prize in recognition of her contributions to the field of African American art.

On October 1, 2024, Patterson was named a MacArthur Fellow.

== Public art collections ==
Patterson's work is held in a number of public art institutions, this is a select list including:

- Pérez Art Museum, Miami, Florida
- Arkansas Arts Center, Little Rock, Arkansas
- Birmingham Museum of Art, Birmingham, Alabama
- Eastern Illinois University, Tarble Arts Center, Charleston, Illinois
- Edna Manley College of the Visual Arts, Kingston, Jamaica
- Nasher Museum, Duke University, Durham, North Carolina
- National Gallery of Jamaica, Kingston, Jamaica
- Wifredo Lam Center for Contemporary Art, Havana, Cuba
- Nerman Museum of Contemporary Art, Overland Park, Kansas
- Pennsylvania Academy of Fine Arts, Philadelphia, Pennsylvania
- Pont-Aven School of Contemporary Art, Pont-Aven, France
- Seattle Art Museum, Seattle, Washington
- Speed Art Museum, Louisville, Kentucky
- Studio Museum in Harlem, New York City, New York
