= Osmond Watson =

Jamaican painter and sculptor (1934–2005)

Osmond Watson (13 June 1934 – 15 November 2005) was a Jamaican painter and sculptor.

== Biography ==
Born in Kingston, Jamaica, Watson attended art classes at the Institute of Jamaica's Junior Centre from 1948 until 1952; from that year until 1958 he attended the Jamaica School of Art and Crafts (JSAC) in Kingston. He began exhibiting, with some success, in his home country, but decided to go to London in 1961 for further study at St Martin's School of Art; there he remained until 1965, becoming acquainted as well with the collections of the British Museum.

His style changed somewhat after his return from England; his mature work was marked by the influence of African art, particularly of the Yoruba people, and cubism. Much of his subject matter was drawn from Jamaican society, including the Junkanoo festival and the Rastafari movement.

In 1992 he was awarded the Musgrave Gold Medal by the Institute of Jamaica for his work.
