= Deborah Anzinger =

Jamaican artist

- Born: 1978 (age 47–48); Jamaica
- Known for: abstraction
- Notable work: An Unlikely Birth, Untitled Transmutations
- Movement: Contemporary Art

Deborah Anzinger (born in 1978) is a Jamaican artist who creates painting, sculpture, video and sound to "interrogate and reconfigure aesthetic syntax that relate us to land and gendered and raced bodies". Anzinger works as an artist has been featured in several exhibitions, galleries and museums which include the National Gallery of Jamaica, Pérez Art Museum Miami and the Institute of Contemporary Art, Philadelphia.

== Early life and career ==
Anzinger was born in St. Andrew Parish, Jamaica in 1978. She began her tertiary education at the University of the West Indies, Mona in 1996 and went on to complete a BS from Washington College in 2001, where she majored in Biology with a concentration in Plant Physiology, and a PhD in Immunology and Microbiology from Rush University Medical Center in Chicago with a concentration in HIV Neuropathogenesis.

== Career ==
She is the founder of New Local Space (NLS) in Kingston, Jamaica. Anzinger's writing has been published in Caribbean Quarterly and in Seen, a journal of the BlackStar Projects.

== Exhibitions ==
- New Roots: 10 Emerging Artists, July 28–September 30, 2013, National Gallery of Jamaica
- Field Notes: Extracts, June 18, 2015 – September 27, 2015, Museum of Contemporary African Diasporan Arts
- An Unlikely Birth, April 26–August 11, 2019, Institute of Contemporary Art, Philadelphia
- The Other Side of Now: Foresight in Contemporary Caribbean Art, July 18, 2019 – June 7, 2020, Pérez Art Museum Miami
- Resisting Paradise, September 19–December 8, 2019, Fonderie Darling, Montréal (Canada)
- 35th Bienal de São Paulo, July, 2023 - December, 2024, Fundaçao Bienal de São Paulo, São Paulo (Brazil)

== Collections (selection) ==
- Pérez Art Museum Miami, Florida

== Awards and grants ==
- 2004 American Association of University Women fellowship
- 2016 fellowship to Skowhegan School of Painting and Sculpture
- 2018 Pollock-Krasner Foundation Grant
- 2020 Soros Arts Fellow
- 2022 MacDowell

== Bibliography ==
- King, Daniella Rose; Purifoy, Danielle (30 June 2021). Deborah Anzinger: An Unlikely Birth. University of Pennsylvania, Institute of Contemporary Art. ISBN 978-0-88454-152-3.
