= Alicia Lisa Brown =

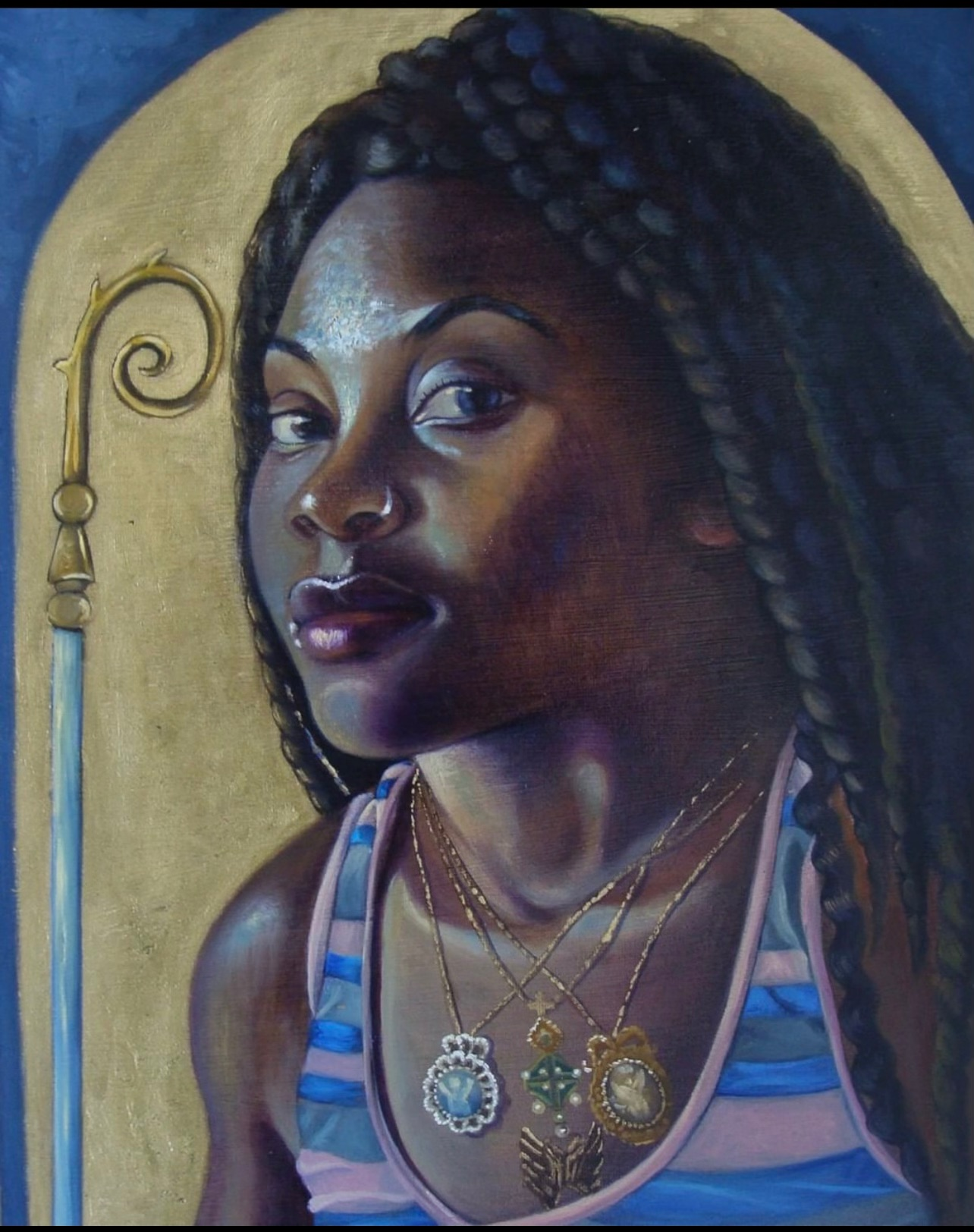
Alicia Lisa Brown, Priest 2, 2017.

Alicia Lisa Brown is a contemporary Jamaican painter and educator. She is a graduate of Edna Manley College of the Visual and Performing Arts and the New York Academy of Art. She currently resides in Florida.

== Early life and education ==
Alicia Lisa Brown (recognized as "Alicia Brown") is a Jamaican artist born in 1982. In 2009, she earned her BFA in Painting and a diploma in Art Education from Edna Manley College of the Visual and Performing Arts. She worked as a secondary teacher for a few years before moving to New York in 2012 and enrolling in the New York Academy of Art's graduate program. She received her MFA in painting in 2014. She worked as a college professor in Jamaica for half a decade before returning to the U.S. and establishing herself as a full time-artist in Florida.

== Style and themes ==
Alicia Lisa Brown has a is figurative, realist art style. Her work features black men and women. These subjects have been historically ignored or misrepresented in the portraiture genre. She often presents figures in relation to a nature environment and/or adorned in nature. Her work tackles themes of belonging, adaptation, migration and diaspora.

== Artistic career ==
=== Residencies ===
- 2017- Cuttyhunk Island Artists’ Residency
- 2013- LIA Artists’ Residency, Leipzig, Germany

=== Awards ===
- 2017- Dawn Scott Memorial Award, 2017 Jamaica Biennial
- 2004- Two Bronze medals award, Jamaica Cultural Development art competition
- 2003- Bronze medal and merit certificate award, Jamaica Cultural Development art competition

=== Grants ===
- 2021- Elizabeth Greenshields Foundation Artist Grant
- 2019- Elizabeth Greenshields Foundation Artist Grant
- 2014- LCU Fund for Women Education Grant
- 2013- Joan Mitchell Foundation Grant

== Solo exhibitions ==
- 2025- Alicia Brown: Caribbean Transformers. Becoming and Being in the New World, Richard M. Ross Art Museum, Delaware, Ohio
- 2023- Alicia Brown: Coming to 'Merica: Invasive Species, Winston Wächter Fine Art, New York, New York
- 2022- 'What About the Men, Alicia Brown', UUU ART COLLECTIVE, Rochester New York, USA
- 2020- ‘What if the man in the new world needs mimicry as design, both as defense and lure?’ Virago Gallery, Seattle Washington, USA
- 2016- ‘Copy and Placed’, Studio 174, Kingston, Jamaica
