= Albert Chong =

Albert Chong (born 1958) is an artist of African and Chinese descent. Chong works across medias and has produced series of photographs as well as installations and sculptures. He states that the purpose of much of his art is to "represent and reanimate his family history." He has said that he uses his family heritage as "an alternative way of putting more out there that's about people of color, letting other stories be heard, other viewpoints".

== Early life ==
Chong was born in Kingston, Jamaica, in 1958. His parents ran a grocery store and his father was a well-respected justice of the peace. His multicultural heritage is described in an L.A. times article: "Half-Chinese, half-Jamaican Chong was raised Catholic but has followed Rastafari, the Ethiopian-inspired political/religious movement, and Santeria, the syncretic religion forged by African slaves living under Christian domination in the Caribbean." The article also relates an episode from Chong's early childhood, wherein his father brought both a Catholic priest and an Obeahman shaman to bless a new house they had bought in Jamaica.

Chong immigrated permanently to the United States in 1977, settling first with his sisters in Brooklyn. He attended the School of Visual Arts in New York City from 1978 to 1981, and in 1981, Chong started his exhibiting career. In 1988, his family moved to San Diego, and Chong attended the University of California, San Diego. In 1991, Chong received his Master of Fine Arts degree from that university.

== Artwork ==
Chong works across art medias, primarily in photography, installation, and sculpture. The content of the work deals with mysticism, spirituality, race and identity, as well as investigating the inherent value in images and objects. Chong’s best known bodies of work are black and white still life photographs.

His work was included in the 2025 exhibition Photography and the Black Arts Movement, 1955–1985 at the National Gallery of Art.

== Teaching ==
Chong lives in the United States and has taught at several different colleges and universities. From 1982 to 1988, he taught at the School of Visual Arts in New York City; from 1989 to 1991 at Mira Costa College in Oceanside, California; and from 1996 to 1997 at the Rhode Island School of Design in Providence, Rhode Island. Currently Chong teaches at The University of Colorado Boulder, in Boulder, Colorado.

== Awards ==
Chong has been awarded a number of prestigious awards for his work. In 1992 he was awarded an individual artist fellowship from the National Endowment for the Arts. In 1998 he was awarded a Guggenheim Fellowship, and later that same year he was awarded a Pollock-Krasner Foundation Grant.
