= Margaret Chen =

Jamaican sculptor (born 1951)

Margaret L. Chen (born 1951) is a Jamaican sculptor of Chinese descent. Many of her pieces, such as the Steppe series, reflect aspects of her heritage.

Chen was educated at the Jamaica School of Art and Crafts and after graduating she moved to Canada to pursue further study at York University. Her career began with exhibitions in Toronto, but she returned to Jamaica for her first solo show. Her pieces are typically large and very detailed. A relief in the Steppe series is held by the National Gallery of Jamaica. The Steppe series was largely inspired by her family's furniture making business.
