= Adolphe Duperly =

French engraver, lithographer and printer

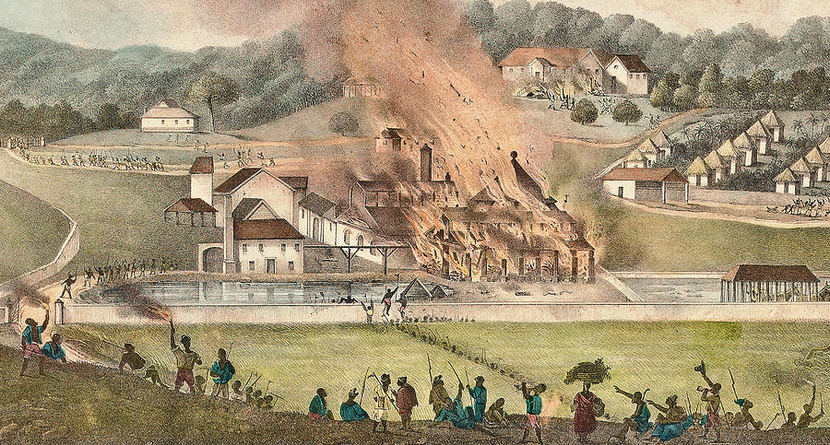
The Destruction of Roehampton Estate in the parish of St. James's in January 1832 the property of J. Baillie Esq. Lithograph, Adolphe Duperly, Jamaica 1833.

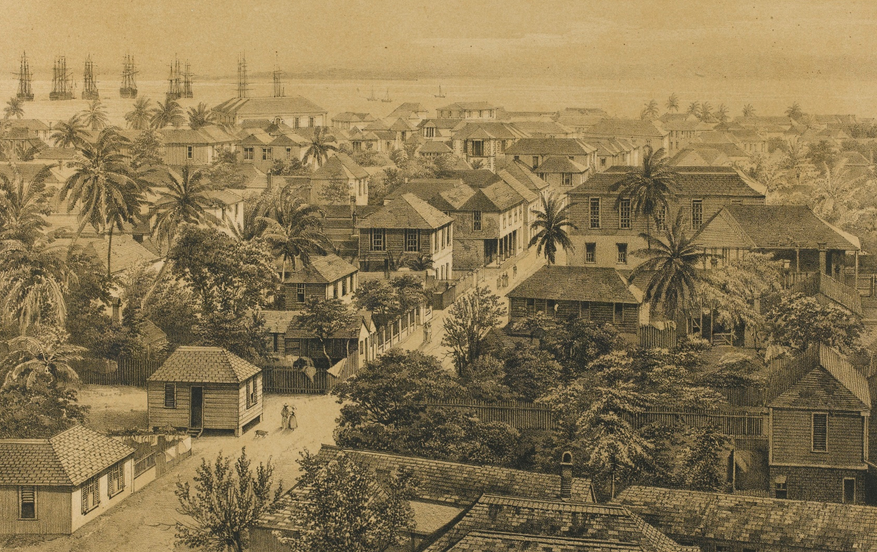
Falmouth taken from the Church Tower

Adolphe Duperly (1801–1865) was a French engraver, lithographer and printer who settled in Kingston, Jamaica, and who produced daguerreotypes and then founded a photography business.

Duperly was born in Paris, but was in Jamaica in the 1830s and produced a lithograph of the 1831 Baptist War and the emancipation celebrations in Kingston in 1838. He also provided a pictorial chronicle of African-Caribbean people in the 1830s. During the 1840s he published a collection of daguerreotypes of Jamaica.

He established Adolphe Duperly and Sons, which became the most successful photography business in Jamaica. The company was continued after his death by his son, Armond, and grandson Théophile. The companies original premises was destroyed by fire in 1907. From 1909 their studio was 85 King Street, Kingston.

== Duperly and Haiti ==
Duperly moved to Haiti in 1823 and became one of the teachers of the Lycée National of Haiti (Lycée Toussaint Louverture in Haiti).

== References and sources ==
Staff writer (6 June 1823). "News" (PDF). Le Télégraphe. pp. 4–5.
