= 2006 in public domain =

When a work's copyright expires, it enters the public domain. The following is a list of works that entered the public domain in 2006. Since laws vary globally, the copyright status of some works are not uniform.

== Entered the public domain in countries with life + 70 years ==
With the exception of Belarus (Life + 50 years) and Spain (Life + 80 years for creators that died before 1987), a work enters the public domain in Europe 70 years after the creator's death, if it was published during the creator's lifetime. The list is sorted alphabetically and includes a notable work of the creator that entered the public domain on January 1, 2006.

| Names | Country | Birth | Death | Occupation | Notable work |
|---|---|---|---|---|---|
| Lewis Grassic Gibbon | United Kingdom | 13 February 1901 | 7 February 1935 | novelist. | A Scots Quair, Spartacus |
| Ioan Bianu | Romania | 1856 | 13 February 1935 | philologist and bibliographer. | Bibliografia Românească veche (1508–1830), Catalogul manuscriselor românești din Biblioteca Academiei |
| Vernon Lee | United Kingdom | 14 October 1856 | 13 February 1935 | writer of supernatural fiction, essayist on aesthetics. | Studies of the Eighteenth Century in Italy, Euphorion: Being Studies of the Antique and the Mediaeval in the Renaissance |
| Tsubouchi Shōyō | Japan | 22 May 1859 | 28 February 1935 | playwright, novelist, translator | Kiri Hitoha (A Paulownia Leaf), Hototogisu Kojō no Rakugetsu (The Sinking Moon over the Lonely Castle Where the Cuckoo Cries) |
| Edwin Arlington Robinson | United States | 22 December 1869 | 6 April 1935 | playwright, poet | Children of The Night, The Man Who Died Twice |
| Anna Katharine Green | United States | 11 November 1846 | 11 April 1935 | detective novelist, poet | The Leavenworth Case, Marked "Personal" |
| Panait Istrati | Romania | 10 August 1884 | 16 April 1935 | short story writer | Les Récits d'Adrien Zograffi (The Stories of Adrian Zografi), Adolescence d'Adrien Zograffi (Adolescence of Adrian Zografi) |
| T. E. Lawrence | United Kingdom | 16 August 1888 | 19 May 1935 | autobiographer | Seven Pillars of Wisdom, The Mint |
| Kaitarō Hasegawa | Japan | 17 January 1900 | 29 June 1935 | novelist, translator | Jappu shobai orai (A Jap Businessman's Guide), Tange Sazen |
| George William Russell | Ireland | 10 April 1867 | 17 July 1935 | poet, painter, literary critic, writer on mysticism | Candle of Vision: Autobiography of a Mystic, The National Being: Some Thoughts on an Irish Polity |
| William Watson | United Kingdom | 2 August 1858 | 11 August 1935 | poet | The Purple East: A Series Of Sonnets On England's Desertion of Armenia, The Superhuman Antagonists and Other Poems |
| Charlotte Perkins Gilman | United States | 3 July 1860 | 17 August 1935 | novelist, short story writer, magazine editor | The Yellow Wallpaper, Herland |
| Henri Barbusse | France | 17 May 1873 | 30 August 1935 | novelist, short story writer, poet | Under Fire, Hell |
| Iván Persa | Slovenia | 2 April 1861 | 26 September 1935 | religious writer | Od vnouge i velke miloscse i pomoucsi szvétoga skapulera |
| Winifred Holtby | United Kingdom | 2 April 1898 | 29 September 1935 | novelist, poet, non-fiction writer | South Riding, Women and a changing civilization |
| Steele Rudd | Australia | 14 November 1868 | 11 October 1935 | short story writer, novelist | On Our Selection, The Romance of Runnibede |
| Ella Loraine Dorsey | United States | 2 March 1853 | 3 November 1935 | writer of young adult fiction, translator, encyclopedia contributor | The Knickerbocker Ghost, The Tsar's Horses |
| Mary R. P. Hatch | United States | 19 June 1848 | 28 November 1935 | novelist, poet | The Upland mystery : a tragedy of New England, The bank tragedy : a novel |
| Louise Manning Hodgkins | United States | 5 August 1846 | 28 November 1935 | educational writer, editor, historian on religious history | A Guide to the study of nineteenth century authors, Via Christi : an introduction to the study of missions |
| Mary G. Charlton Edholm | United States | 28 October 1854 | 29 November 1935 | journalist, editor, non-fiction writer on sex trafficking | The Traffic in Girls and Florence Crittenton Missions, Shall our Women Vote? |
| Fernando Pessoa | Portugal | 13 June 1888 | 30 November 1935 | poet, literary critic, translator, philosopher | Mensagem, The Book of Disquiet |
| Stanley G. Weinbaum | United States | 4 April 1902 | 14 December 1935 | science fiction writer | A Martian Odyssey, Valley of Dreams |
| Lizette Woodworth Reese | United States | 9 January 1856 | 17 December 1935 | poet | A Victorian Village: Reminiscences of Other Days, The Old House in the Country |
| Kurt Tucholsky | Germany | 9 January 1890 | 21 December 1935 | political writer, satirist, essayist | Rheinsberg, Schloss Gripsholm |
| Clarence Day | United States | 18 November 1874 | 28 December 1935 | comic writer, cartoonist | Life with Father, God and my Father |

== Entered the public domain in countries with life + 50 years ==
In most countries of Africa and Asia, as well as Belarus, Bolivia, Canada, New Zealand, Egypt and Uruguay; a work enters the public domain 50 years after the creator's death.

| Names | Country | Birth | Death | Occupation | Notable work |
|---|---|---|---|---|---|
| Fik Abbing | Netherlands | 8 May 1901 | 12 August 1955 | Painter, Illustrator | Works |
| Dmytro Abramovych | Soviet Union | 7 August 1873 | 4 March 1955 | Historian, writer | Kyiv Caves Patericon (editor) |
| Eugene Agafonoff | Russian Empire; United States | 2 October 1879 | 20 April 1955 | Painter | Portrait of B. K. Rudniev |
| James Agee | United States | 27 November 1909 | 16 May 1955 | Novelist, Journalist, Poet, Screenwriter | A Death in the Family, Let Us Now Praise Famous Men |
| Silvio D'Amico | Italy | 3 February 1887 | 1 April 1955 | Theatre theorist | |
| Opanas Andriievskyi | Ukraine | 1878 | 16 May 1955 | Politician | Ukrainian Nationalism, 1917—1919 |
| Viktor Averin | Soviet Union | 18 October 1885 | 27 December 1955 | Zoologist | On the ornithology of the Kharkov province |
| Ruby M. Ayres | United Kingdom | 28 January 1881 | 14 November 1955 | Romance novelist | Richard Chatterton, V.C., Castles in Spain, and other books |
| Johannes Baader | Germany | 21 June 1875 | 14 January 1955 | Writer, Artist, Architect | |
| Lloyd Bacon | United States | 4 December 1889 | 15 November 1955 | Actor, Film director | Filmography as director |
| Guido Battelli | Italy | 24 September 1869 | 13 April 1955 | Writer | Works |
| Leonid Biletskyi | Ukraine; Canada | 17 June 1882 | 5 February 1955 | Literary scholar | Fundamentals of the Ukrainian Literary and Scholarly Criticism |
| Yulii Brashchaiko | Ukraine; Soviet Union | 19 April 1879 | 9 October 1955 | Politician | What I saw in Transcarpathia from 1918 to 1946 |
| Gilbert Cannan | United Kingdom | 25 June 1884 | 30 June 1955 | Novelist, dramatist | The Release of the Soul, Windmills: A Book of Fables |
| Dale Carnegie | United States | 24 November 1888 | 1 November 1955 | Writer on self-help | How to Win Friends and Influence People, How to Stop Worrying and Start Living |
| Pierre Teilhard de Chardin | France | 1 May 1881 | 10 April 1955 | Jesuit priest, Scientist, Paleontologist, Theologian, Philosopher | The Phenomenon of Man, Writings in Time of War |
| Beatrice Chase | United Kingdom | 5 July 1874 | 3 July 1955 | Novelist, religious writer, photographer | The Voice of the River, The Heart of the Moor |
| Eugenio Cirese | Italy | 21 February 1884 | 8 February 1955 | Poet | Works |
| Paul Claudel | France | 6 August 1868 | 23 February 1955 | Poet, Dramatist | The Satin Slipper, Jeanne d'Arc au bûcher, and other works |
| Robert P. T. Coffin | United States | 18 March 1892 | 20 January 1955 | Poet, literary critic, editor | The Dukes of Buckingham, Playboys of the Stuart World, Red Sky in the Morning |
| Jim Corbett | British India | 25 July 1875 | 19 April 1955 | Naturalist, writer | Man-Eaters of Kumaon |
| Donald Corley | United States | 8 June 1886 | 11 December 1955 | Short story author, illustrator, architect | |
| Alfredo Cuscinà | Italy | 30 November 1881 | 30 March 1955 | Composer | Main operettas |
| William C. deMille | United States | 25 July 1878 | 5 March 1955 | Screenwriter, Film director | Filmography |
| Pavlo Dolyna | Soviet Union | 12 November 1884 | 15 September 1955 | Director | Storm |
| Isaak Dunayevsky | Soviet Union | 30 January 1900 | 25 July 1955 | Composer | Wide is My Motherland, Moya Moskva |
| Mykola Duzhyi | Ukraine; Soviet Union | 13 December 1901 | 18 May 1955 | Politician, essayist | The ideological and political face of VKP(b) and VLKSM |
| Mary Tracy Earle | United States | 21 October 1864 | 7 September 1955 | Short story writer, essayist, librarian | The Wonderful Wheel, Through Old Rose Glasses |
| Albert Einstein | Germany; United States | 14 March 1879 | 18 April 1955 | Theoretical physicist | Scientific publications, The Evolution of Physics, The Meaning of Relativity |
| George Enescu | Romania | 19 August 1881 | 4 May 1955 | Composer | Compositions |
| Adalbert Erdeli | Soviet Union; Ukraine; Hungary | 25 May 1891 | 19 September 1955 | Painter, sculptor | River in Uzhhorod |
| Concha Espina | Spain | 15 April 1879 | 19 May 1955 | Writer | Bibliography |
| Émile Fabre | France | 24 March 1869 | 25 September 1955 | Playwright | Plays |
| Joseph Jefferson Farjeon | United Kingdom | 4 June 1883 | 6 June 1955 | Novelist, Playwright, Screenwriter | Number 17, The Z Murders, and other works |
| Nicolai Fechin | Russian Empire; United States | 8 December 1881 | 5 October 1955 | Painter | Portrait of Jack Hunter |
| Sári Fedák | Hungary | 27 September 1899 | 5 May 1955 | Singer | |
| Alexander Fleming | United Kingdom | 6 August 1881 | 11 March 1955 | Physician | On the Antibacterial Action of Cultures of a Penicillium (...) |
| José Ortega y Gasset | Spain | 9 May 1883 | 18 October 1955 | Philosopher, Essayist | The Revolt of the Masses, The Dehumanization of Art, and other works |
| Calouste Gulbenkian | Armenia; United Kingdom | 23 March 1869 | 20 July 1955 | Businessman, philanthropist | La Transcaucasie et la péninsule d'Apchéron; souvenirs de voyage |
| Rodolfo Graziani | Italy | 11 August 1882 | 11 January 1955 | General | Books |
| Yurii Hoida | Soviet Union | 15 March 1919 | 2 June 1955 | Writer, translator | Hungarian Melodies |
| Constance Holme | United Kingdom | 7 October 1880 | 17 June 1955 | Novelist, playwright | The Old Road from Spain, The Wisdom of the Simple and Other Stories |
| Arthur Honegger | Switzerland | 10 March 1892 | 27 November 1955 | Composer | Compositions |
| Clemence Housman | United Kingdom | 23 November 1861 | 6 December 1955 | Author | |
| María Izquierdo | Mexico | 30 October 1902 | 2 December 1955 | Painter | |
| Herbert Stanley Jevons | UK | 8 October 1875 | 27 June 1955 | Economist | |
| James P. Johnson | United States | 1 February 1894 | 17 November 1955 | Composer, pianist | Charleston |
| Emma Jung | Switzerland | 30 March 1882 | 27 November 1955 | Psychologist, writer | Animus and Anima |
| Mihály Károlyi | Hungary | 4 March 1875 | 19 March 1955 | Politician | Memoirs: Faith without Illusion |
| Stepan Kolesnikoff | Russian Empire; Yugoslavia | 23 July 1879 | 27 May 1955 | Painter, sculptor | On the Seashore |
| Nikolay Krylov | Soviet Union | 29 November 1879 | 11 May 1955 | Mathematician | Les Méthodes de Solution Approchée des Problèmes de la Physique Mathématique |
| Bohdan Kryzhanivskyi | Soviet Union | 24 August 1894 | 20 April 1955 | Composer | Danylo Halytskyi |
| Fernand Léger | France | 4 February 1881 | 17 August 1955 | Painter, Sculptor, Filmmaker | |
| Anastasiia Levytska | Soviet Union | 16 November 1899 | 6 November 1955 | Singer | |
| Roger Mais | Jamaica | 11 August 1905 | 21 June 1955 | Novelist, short story writer, poet, playwright | The Hills Were Joyful Together, Brother Man |
| Juliusz Makarewicz | Poland | 5 May 1875 | 20 April 1955 | Lawyer | Prawo karne: wykład porównawczy z uwzględnieniem prawa obowiązującego w Rzeczypospolitej Polskiej |
| Thomas Mann | Germany | 6 June 1875 | 12 August 1955 | Novelist, philosopher, essayist | Buddenbrooks, Doctor Faustus, and other works |
| Carl Milles | Sweden | 23 June 1875 | 19 September 1955 | Sculptor | Works |
| Carmen Miranda | Portugal; Brazil | 9 February 1909 | 5 August 1955 | Singer | O Que É Que A Baiana Tem? |
| António Egas Moniz | Portugal | 29 November 1874 | 13 December 1955 | Neurologist | Prefrontal leucotomy. Surgical treatment of certain psychoses |
| Adrienne Monnier | France | 26 April 1892 | 19 June 1955 | Writer, publisher, translator | Souvenirs de Londres, Rue de l'Odéon |
| Luka Myshuha | Ukraine; United States | 13 October 1887 | 8 February 1955 | Historian, journalist | What Are the Courts Like Today in Ukraine? |
| Garegin Nzhdeh | Armenia | 1 January 1886 | 21 December 1955 | Statesman, writer | Pages from my diary, An open letter to the Armenian intelligentsia |
| Jaime Ovalle | Brazil | 5 August 1894 | 9 September 1955 | Composer | Works |
| Alexandros Papagos | Greece | 9 December 1883 | 4 October 1955 | General | The battle for Greece |
| Charlie Parker | United States | 29 August 1920 | 12 March 1955 | Saxophonist | |
| Max Pechstein | Germany | 31 December 1881 | 29 June 1955 | Painter | |
| Francesco Balilla Pratella | Italy | 1 February 1880 | 17 May 1955 | Composer | Selected Works |
| Herbert Putnam | United States | 20 September 1861 | 14 August 1955 | Librarian | Putnam Classification System |
| Mahammad Amin Rasulzade | Azerbaijan | 31 January 1884 | 6 March 1955 | Politician, playwright | Siyavush of our century |
| Oleksii Riabov | Soviet Union | 17 March 1899 | 18 December 1955 | Composer | Wedding in Malinovka (operetta) |
| Robert Riskin | United States | 30 March 1897 | 20 September 1955 | Screenwriter, Playwright | Bless You Sister, Many a Slip, and other films |
| Helena Roerich | Russia | 12 February 1879 | 5 October 1955 | Philosopher, writer | The Holy Scripture of Agni Yoga |
| Rupprecht, Crown Prince of Bavaria | Germany | 18 May 1869 | 2 August 1955 | General, prince | My War Diary |
| Ango Sakaguchi | Japan | 20 October 1906 | 17 February 1955 | Writer | Darakuron, Kazehakase |
| Volodymyr Savchenko-Bilskyi | Ukraine | 14 July 1867 | 21 September 1955 | Admiral | Military fleet of Ukraine |
| Nat Schachner | United States | 16 January 1895 | 2 October 1955 | Author and biographer | Space Lawyer |
| Charles Shaw | Australia | 10 August 1900 | 1 August 1955 | Detective novelist, short story writer | Heaven Knows, Mr. Allison and You're Wrong, Delaney |
| Robert E. Sherwood | United States | 4 April 1896 | 14 November 1955 | Screenwriter, playwright | Waterloo Bridge, Idiot's Delight |
| Nicolas de Staël | France | 5 January 1914 | 16 March 1955 | Painter | |
| Rainer Stahel | Germany | 15 January 1892 | 30 November 1955 | General | Das 1. Lothringische Infanterie-Regiment Nr 130 (...) |
| Al. T. Stamatiad | Romania | 9 May 1885 | December 1955 | Poet, short story writer, dramatist, translator | Noapte, Cetatea cu porțile închise |
| Wallace Stevens | United States | 2 October 1879 | 2 August 1955 | Modernist poet | The Auroras of Autumn, Harmonium, The Man with the Blue Guitar |
| Yves Tanguy | France | 5 January 1900 | 15 January 1955 | Painter | Paintings |
| Yevgeny Tarle | Soviet Union | 27 October 1874 | 6 January 1955 | Historian | Napoleon's Invasion of Russia, 1812 |
| Tin Ujević | Croatia | 5 July 1891 | 12 November 1955 | Poet | Mrsko ja, Ispit savjesti, and other works |
| Maurice Utrillo | France | 26 December 1883 | 5 November 1955 | Painter | |
| Edouard Verschaffelt | Belgium | 1874 | 1955 | Painter | |
| Anwar Wagdi | Egypt | 11 October 1904 | 14 May 1955 | Director | The Flirtation of Girls |
| Léon Werth | France | 17 February 1878 | 13 December 1955 | Writer | Books |
| Hermann Weyl | Germany | 9 November 1885 | 8 December 1955 | Mathematician, Theoretical physicist, Philosopher | Bibliography |
| Alexander Wienerberger | Austria | 8 December 1891 | 5 January 1955 | Photographer, engineer | Photographic evidence of Holodomor |
| Andrii Yakovliv | Ukraine | 11 December 1872 | 14 May 1955 | Politician, lawyer | Ukrainian-Muscovite Treaties of the 17th–18th Centuries |

== Entering the public domain in the United States ==
In the United States, the copyright status of works extends for the life of the author or artists, plus 70 years. If the work is owned by a corporation, then the copyright extends 95 years.

Due to the passing of the Copyright Term Extension Act (Sonny Bono Copyright Term Extension Act) in 1998, works never registered or published before January 1, 1978, and whose authors died before 1936 entered the public domain in this jurisdiction on January 1, 2006. Other works would not enter the public domain here until 2019.

== See also ==
- 1905 in literature, 1935 in literature and 1955 in literature for deaths of writers
- Public Domain Day
- Creative Commons
