= Siyavush of our century =

Essay by Mahammad Amin Rasulzade,

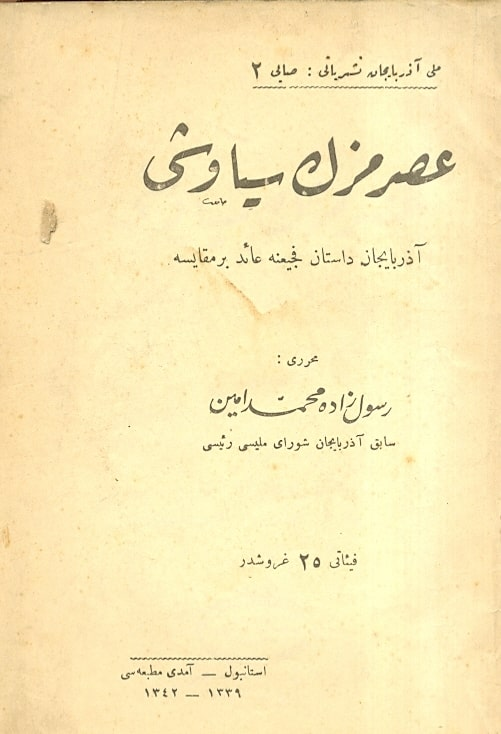
- Title page of the Istanbul edition (1923) in Turkish
- Author: Mahammad Amin Rasulzade
- Language: Ottoman Turkish
- Publication date: 1923
- Publication place: Azerbaijan

“Siyavush of our century” (Ottoman Turkish: عصرمزڭ سیاوشی, romanized: 'Asrımızıñ Siyâvuşu; Azerbaijani: Əsrimizin Siyavuşu) is an essay by the former leader of the Party "Musavat" and the Chairman of the National Council of the Azerbaijan Democratic Republic (ADR), Mahammad Amin Rasulzade, dedicated to the history of the national movement in Azerbaijan. It was written in 1920 in Lahij, where after the Soviet occupation of Azerbaijan, Rasulzade was hiding for several days. It was for the first time published in Istanbul in 1923.

== History of creation ==
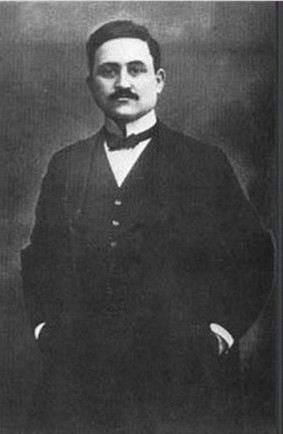
The author, Mammad Amin Rasulzade

After Baku passed into the hands of the Bolsheviks in April 1920, Rasulzade remained in the city for about a month. Afterwards, he and a friend left for Georgia. On the way, he stopped in the village of Lahij, in the house of one of the local residents. There was a small library which contained books both in Persian and Turkic. Rasulzade's attention was drawn by Firdousis's Shahnameh. With the permission of the owner, Rasulzade began to read the poem. Most of all, Rasulzade liked the dastan about Siyâvash. Although he was already familiar with this story, he repeated it aloud to his friend for the second time. Inspired by this work, Rasulzade said:

My friend, you heard Siyavush of our story. Now I will write the Siyavush of our era for you.

Rasulzade's comrade was surprised that in such an environment, when they could be detected at any minute, Rasulzade decided to write. But despite the danger of discobery, Rasulzade proceeded to work. He wrote several pages until they were forced to change locations. The new place, where Rasulzade and his friend were hiding, inspired him more and he continued to write. Six days later they had to move again. Here, Rasulzade completed the draft of the last chapter.

Rasulzade and his comrade could no longer stay in Lahij. Some residents of the village were taken under surveillance, and the supervision was established over the village itself. Rasulzade left Lahij and rewrote the work in another village. Fearing that he might be captured, he gave a copy of his work to a peasant with whom he was staying, and kept the draft with himself. Soon the place where Rasulzade was hiding was discovered and he was arrested. Before surrendering, Rasulzade destroyed the copy he had in his possession.

Rasulzade was taken to Moscow. Two years later, he managed to move to Finland, and from there to Istanbul. During these two years, he did not know if the copy he gave to the peasant had survived. Rasulzade's friends could not have it either, since Rasulzade warned the peasant to give the copy only with his written permission.

Rasulzade was very worried about the lost work. His friends advised him to rewrite it. However, Rasulzade noted that there would be a big difference between the work written in 1920 in Lahij by Ali Ahmedoglu (the name under which he was hiding in Lahij) and the one written in 1923 by Mammad Emin Rasulzade, in Istanbul, since, as Rasulzade wrote, “That spirit and state can no longer be returned”.

Finally, in 1923, Rasulzade discovered that the work had reached Istanbul. In the same year, "Siyavush of our century" was published in Istanbul.

== Translations and publications ==
“Siyavush of our century” was first published in 1923 in Istanbul in Turkish. In 1928, the work was again published in Istanbul. In 1989, "Siyavush of our century" was again published in Ankara.

In 1990, "Siyavush of our century" was firstly published in the Azerbaijani language in Baku. The work was translated from Turkish by Mais Alizade.

== Work analysis ==
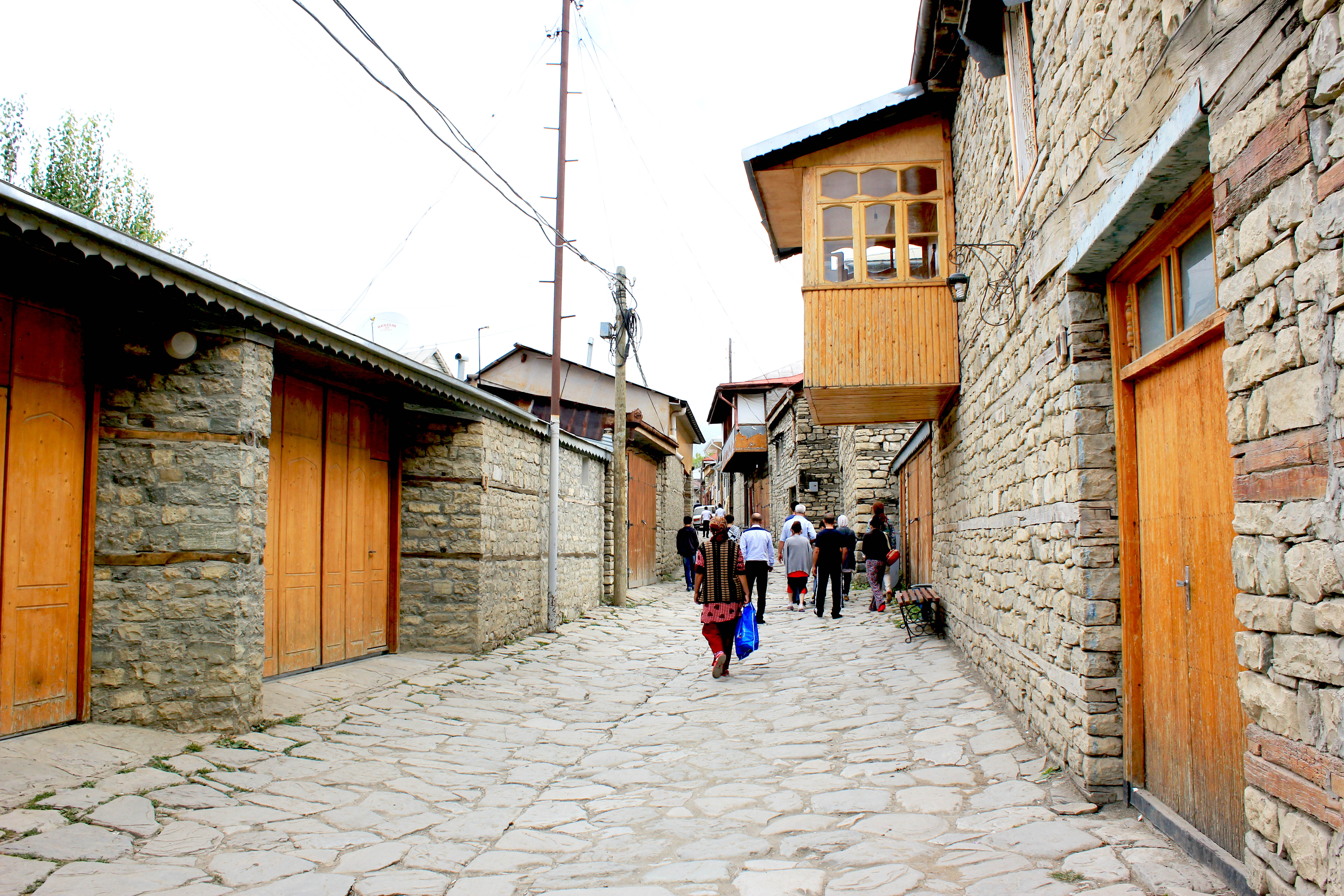
Lahij village (Azerbaijan). Here, in 1920, Rasulzade wrote the "Siyavush of our century"

The Azerbaijani historian Aydin Balayev, calling "Siyavush of our century" "one of the most original" works of Rasulzade, writes that this was the first among a series of works by M. A. Rasulzade, which "generalized the experience of the liberation fight in Azerbaijan at the beginning of the 20th century." According to Balayev, in such works as "Siyavush of our times", Mammad Amin Rasulzade "gives a scrupulous analysis of the events of the new and recent history of Azerbaijan." He, as Balayev writes on the basis of specific historical facts, proves that the proclamation of the ADR in May 1918 was not the result of a coincidence of circumstances, but “a natural result of the process of the national revival and political awakening of Azerbaijani Turks during the modernization processes that embraced the Azerbaijani society at the end of the 19th and the beginning of the 20th century.”

The Russian historian Victor Shnirelmann writes that in this work, Rasulzade “tried once again to defend the principle of federalism, but at the same time referred to the peculiarities of the Azerbaijani nation formation.” As Shnirelmann notes, Rasulzade, appealing for support to Ferdousis's poem "Shahnameh", recalled that the glorious hero Siyavush was the son of the Iranian shah and the Turanian beauty, consequently the “symbol of two cultural worlds fusion”. For the author, according to Shnirelmann, this served as an important argument in favour of the federalism, because, as he emphasized “Siyavush of our times represents the people that combine Iranian and Turanian cultures,” and therefore, this nation “was determined by the fate itself to create the democratic Azerbaijan, respecting the human rights regardless of nationality.” Rasulzade even claimed that the third column of the famous Behistun inscription was made in the "Turanian" language. Shnirelmann believes that Rasulzades intentions were revealed when he resorted to a comparative assessment of the contemporary Iran and Turkey; he considered the former a country of obscurantism, and the latter, according to Shnirelmann, he saw as a symbol of democracy and modernization.

== Literature ==
- Rasulzade, Mahammad Amin (1990). Әсримизин Сијавушу. Чағдаш Азәрбајҹан әдәбијјаты. Чағдаш Азәрбајҹан тарихи. Baku: Ҝәнҹлик. ISBN 5-8020-0772-9.
- Əliyev, M. (1990). Məmməd Əmin Rəsulzadənin ömür yolu. Baku: Ҝәнҹлик.
- Balayev, Aydin (2009). Мамед Эмин Расулзаде (1884-1955) (PDF). Moscow: «Флинта». ISBN 978-5-9765-0785-2. Archived from the original (PDF) on 2017-09-08.
