= Iran-e Now =

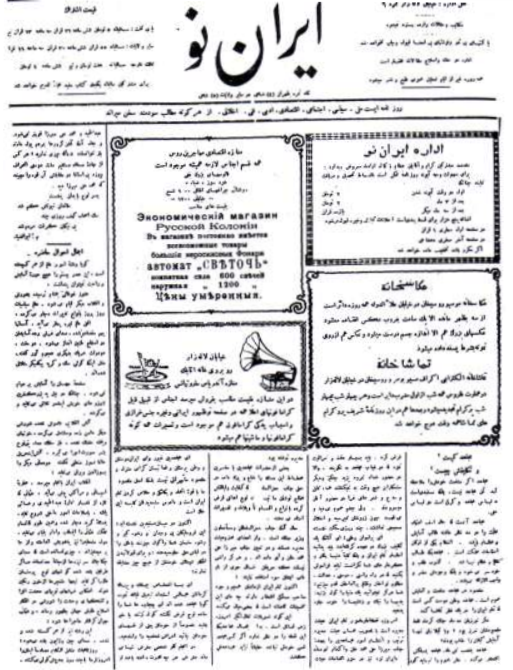
- A page from one of the Iran-e Now newspapers
- Type: Political journalism
- Publisher: Democrat Party
- Editor: Abol-Zia Sayyed Mohammad Shabestari
- General manager: Mahammad Amin Rasulzade
- Founded: 23 August 1909
- Language: Persian
- Ceased publication: 19 December 1911
- City: Tehran

Iran-e Now (Persian: ایران نو, meaning "New Iran") was a political newspaper published in Tehran from 23 August 1909 to 19 December 1911 by the Democrat Party.

The owner and editor of the newspaper was Abol-Zia Sayyed Mohammad Shabestari, who supported the Iranian Constitutional Revolution. Mahammad Amin Rasulzade served as both the newspaper's manager and main contributor until August 1911.

== Sources ==
- Parvin, Nassereddin (2006). "Irān-e now". In Yarshater, Ehsan (ed.). Encyclopædia Iranica. Vol. XIII/5: Iran X. Religions in Iran–Iraq V. Safavid period. London and New York: Routledge & Kegan Paul. pp. 498–500. ISBN 978-0-933273-93-1.
