= Ewald Ammende =

Baltic German journalist and politician (1893–1936)

Ewald Ammende (3 January 1893 in Pernau, Livonia, Russian Empire - 15 April 1936 in Peking, China) was an Estonian journalist, human rights activist and politician of Baltic German origin.

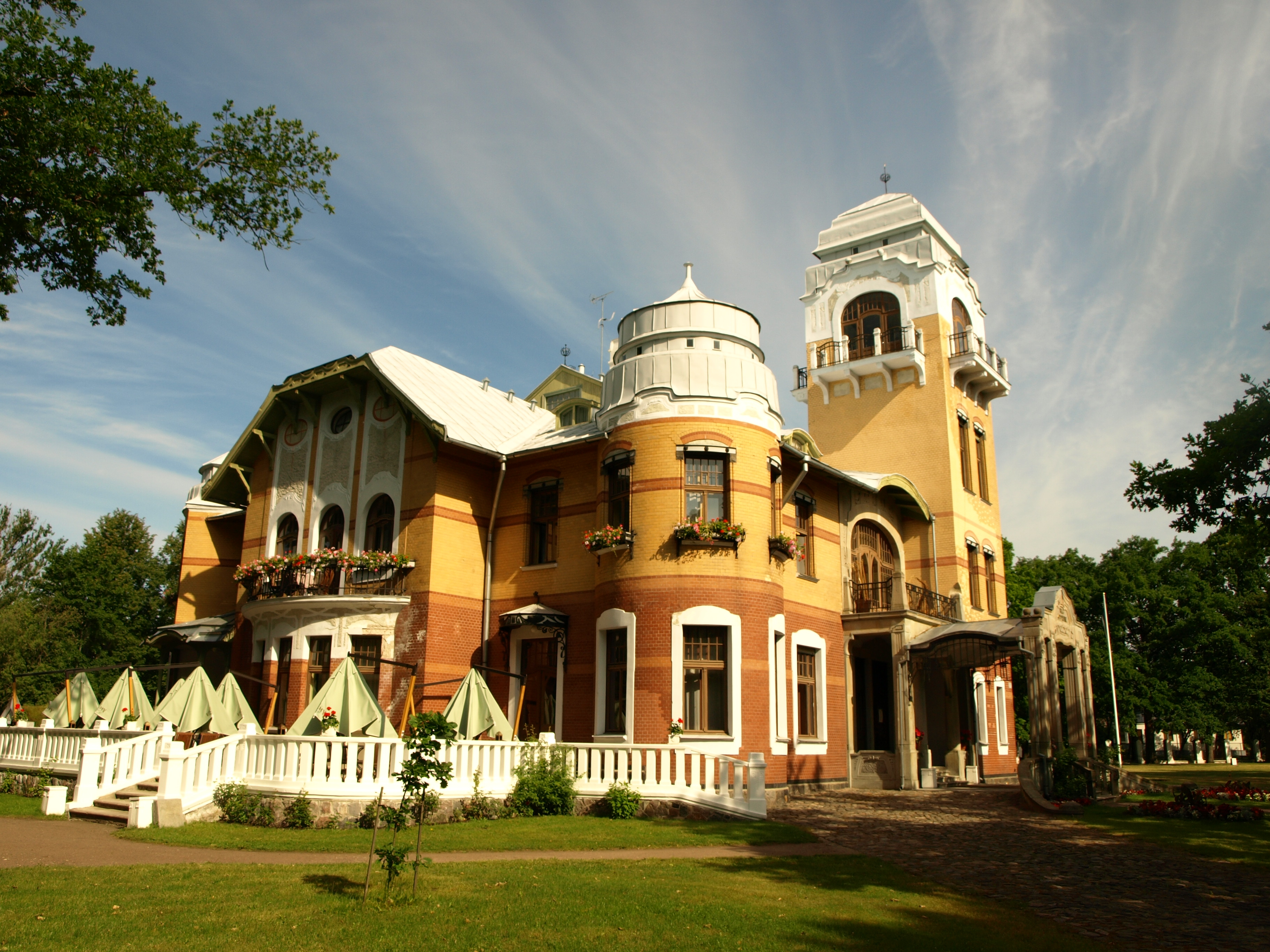
Villa Ammende in Pärnu (Estonia), currently a luxury hotel

== Biography ==
Ewald Ammende came from a wealthy, influential and long-established merchant family in Livonia. After attending high school in Pernau, from 1910 he studied commerce at the Polytechnic in Riga, economics in Cologne and in Tübingen, and received his doctorate in political science at the Christian-Albrecht University in Kiel.

During the First World War, he worked in the catering business for cities in southern Russia. Following the division of the historical region of Livonia into Estonia and Latvia, Ammende began to campaign for national minorities in the international politics. From 1919 to 1922 he worked as an editor and publishing director at the "Rigasche Rundschau" (Riga Review), where he cooperated with another famous defender of ethnic minorities Paul Schiemann. As co-founder of the Association of German Minorities in Europe, Ammende played a key role in the creation of the "Law on the Cultural Autonomy of Minorities in Estonia" in 1925. In the same year minority representatives from different countries elected him General Secretary of the Congress of European Nationalities (ENK).

He became a strong advocate of ethnic minority right and established an umbrella organization to represent ethnic minority organizations (not only those of ethnic Germans). Ammende assumed that a solution of the national questions would not be feasible by way of irredentism and therefore sought a balance between interests of ethnic groups and nation states on the basis of mutual recognition. In his function as secretary-general of the ENK, he was instrumental in assisting the Jewish associations in submission of the Bernheim petition, which discredited him to the National Socialists. At the same time he came into conflict with the US and the Soviet government because of various aid actions and campaigns of the ENK.

Ewald Ammende was also honorary director of the "Interconfessional and transnational relief organization of his Eminence Cardinal Archbishop of Vienna". He was in close contact with Cardinal Theodor Innitzer, who helped him in publishing his most famous book Muss Russland hungern? Menschen und Völkerschicksale in der Sowjetunion ("Must Russia starve? Destinies of People and Peoples in the USSR"). The word "Russia" in the book title, as was common in those years, referred to USSR in general, although the book covered mostly events in Ukraine and Kuban (West Caucasus). The book stirred much controversy because of its contemporary description of the Soviet famine (currently known as Holodomor). Ammende also discussed in his book systematic oppression of various minorities in Ukraine, including the Poles, Magyars, Romanians, Jews, Belarusians and Crimean Germans. Although Ewald Ammende's rejection of the National Socialists was already known at the time of publication, the Soviet authorities accused the ENK that the book was promoting the National Socialist propaganda. This misleading representation took over in the post-war period, among other East German historians, all the way to the modern research literature. Some historians go so far as to label the entire international campaign of the ENK on the famine awareness as part of the anti-Comintern policy of the Nazi regime . Ammende used in his book uncredited photos made by Alexander Wienerberger during his work in Kharkiv in 1933; these photos are currently well known and were reprinted on many occasions.

Ewald Ammende died on April 15, 1936, under obscure circumstances in Beijing, where he wanted to meet with representatives of Jewish minorities from Valdgeym (Jewish National District in Far East). It is only clear that he died in the German Hospital in Beijing. Obituaries appeared in many European newspapers, in which the details of the cause of death ranged from murder, suicide, heart attack, stroke up to the sugar shock (which is currently considered a possible reason, due to family history of the same disease). After his death, his brother, and his right-hand man, Erich Ammende, took over the management of the ENK as an interim charge. He survived his brother by only seven months and died in Vienna.

He was buried in Alevi Cemetery in Pärnu, Estonia.

== Selected works ==
- Die Hilfsaktion für Petersburg. R. Ruetz Riga, 1920.
- Die Agonie einer Weltstadt. Helft Petersburg! R. Ruetz Riga, 1920.
- Europa und Sowjet-Rußland. Curtius-Verlag Berlin, 1921.
- Die Gefährdung des europäischen Friedens durch die nationale Unduldsamkeit. Karl Jaspers Wien, 1927.
- Nationalitäten in den Staaten Europas. Braumüller Universitäts-Verlagsbuchhandlung Wien und Leipzig, 1931.
- Muss Russland hungern? Menschen und Völkerschicksale in der Sowjetunion. Wilhelm Braumüller Universitäts-Verlagsbuchhandlung Wien, 1935.
- Human Life in Russia. G. Allen & Unwin London, 1936.

== Literature ==
- Heinrich Lackmann: Ammende, Ewald. In: Neue Deutsche Biographie, Bayerische Akademie der Wissenschaften, München 1953.
- Rudolf Michaelsen: Der Europäische Nationalitäten-Kongreß 1925-1928: Aufbau, Krise und Konsolidierung. Lang, Frankfurt am Main 1984, ISBN 3-8204-7616-4.
- Sabine Bamberger-Stemmann: Der Europäische Nationalitätenkongress 1925–1938. Nationale Minderheiten zwischen Lobbyistentum und Großmachtinteressen. Herder-Institut, Marburg 2001, ISBN 3-87969-290-4.
- Martyn Housden: On their own behalf : Ewald Ammende, Europe's national minorities and the campaign for cultural autonomy; 1920-1936. Amsterdam : Rodopi, 2014 ISBN 9789042038769
