= The Hills Were Joyful Together =

1953 Roger Mais novel

- First edition cover
- Author: Roger Mais
- Cover artist: Roger Mais
- Language: English
- Subject: poverty, colonialism, crime, racism
- Genre: Novel, realism, social realism
- Set in: Jamaica, early 1940s
- Publisher: Jonathan Cape
- Publication date: 1953
- Publication place: United Kingdom
- Media type: Print: hardback
- Pages: 288
- ISBN: 978-0435985868 (1981 Pearson Education reprint)
- Dewey Decimal: 819.8
- LC Class: PR9265.9 .M3 H5
- Preceded by: Face and Other Stories
- Followed by: Brother Man

The Hills Were Joyful Together is a 1953 novel by Jamaican author Roger Mais.

== Plot ==
In Jamaica during the Second World War, Surjue is persuaded to take part in a robbery and is imprisoned.

== Reception ==
Mais said that the intention of his novel was "to give the world a true picture of the real Jamaica and the dreadful condition of the working classes."

In Imagination, Emblems, and Expressions: Essays on Latin American, Caribbean, and Continental Culture and Identity (1993), Margaret K. Bass writes that Mais notes the depiction of violence, pain and suffering in the book, but says "Mais does not intend to portray the baseness of the lower class. Mais shows us, rather, that the people in the lower class are victims, and that poverty can reduce the human to the inhuman. Violence [...] gives an otherwise powerless people a temporary feeling of control over the particular life or a particular situation."

In 2022, The Hills Were Joyful Together was included on the Big Jubilee Read, a list of 70 books by Commonwealth authors produced to celebrate Queen Elizabeth II's Platinum Jubilee.
