= Aydin Balayev =

Azerbaijani historian (1956–2021)

- Born: 19 November 1956; Baku, Azerbaijan SSR, Soviet Union
- Died: 8 December 2021 (aged 65)
- Education: Azerbaijan State University, Moscow State University
- Occupations: Azerbaijan Democratic Republic, Ethnography in Caucasus
- Notable work: Azerbaijani National Democratic Movement, Mammad Emin Rasulzade (1884-1955), History of the American People, March 1918: A Defining Moment For Azerbaijan

Aydin Balayev Huseynaga oglu (Azerbaijani: Aydın Balayev Hüseynağa oğlu; 19 November 1956 – 8 December 2021) was an Azerbaijani historian, ethnologist, and professor.

== Biography ==
Balayev was born on 19 November 1956, in Baku, capital of Azerbaijan SSR. In 1980, he graduated cum laude from the Department of History of Azerbaijan State University and in 1982 he started working at the Archeology and Ethnography Institute of the Azerbaijan National Academy of Sciences. In 1983-1985, Balayev was a researcher at the Ethnography Department of the Moscow State University. From 1985, he continued his doctoral studies at the Ethnography Institute of USSR Academy of Sciences in Moscow, graduating with a PhD in History in 1988.

In 2001, while in Baku, he defended another dissertation on the Azerbaijani Independence Movement in 1917-1918. He served as the Program Chair at the Center for National and International Studied and was a member of the Academy of National Sciences of Azerbaijan.

Balayev died on 8 December 2021, at the age of 65.

== Publications ==
=== Books ===
- The Azerbaijani National Movement: From Müsavat to the National Front (Baku, 1992)
- Azerbaijani Independence Movement in 1917-1918 (Baku, 1998)
- Ethnolinguistic processes in the 19th-20th centuries (Baku, 2005)
- February Revolution and National Achievements (Moscow, 2008)
- March 1918: A Defining Moment For Azerbaijan (Tbilisi, 2009)
- Mammad Emin Rasulzade (1884-1955) (Moscow, 2009)
- Azerbaijani Turks: National Awareness Processes (Baku, 2010)

=== Monographs ===
- History of Azerbaijan. From Ancient Times to the Beginning of the 20th Century (Baku, 1993)
- Azerbaijanis. Historical ethnographic overview (Baku, 1998)
- Azeris (Baku, 2005)

Balayev has additionally published many articles on the history of Azerbaijani independence movement in the 1980s-1990s, Karabakh conflict, regional processes in the Caucasus in the United States, Great Britain, Germany, France, Canada, Denmark and Russia. In total, Balayev has authored 72 books, 16 of which were published abroad, and 6 monographs.
