= Roger Mais =

Jamaican writer (1905–1955)

Roger Mais OJ
- Born: 11 August 1905; Kingston, Colony of Jamaica, British Empire
- Died: 21 June 1955 (aged 49)
- Education: Calabar High School
- Occupations: Journalist, novelist, poet, and playwright
- Notable work: Brother Man (1954)

Roger Mais OJ (/ˈmeɪz/; 11 August 1905 – 21 June 1955) was a Jamaican journalist, novelist, poet, and playwright. He was born to a middle-class family in Kingston, Jamaica. By 1951, he had won ten first prizes in West Indian literary competitions. His integral role in the development of political and cultural nationalism is evidenced in his being awarded the high honour of the Order of Jamaica in 1978.

== Biography ==
Roger Mais was born in Kingston, Jamaica, where he was educated at Calabar High School.

He worked at various times as a photographer, insurance salesman, and journalist, launching his journalistic career as a contributor to the weekly newspaper Public Opinion from 1939 to 1952, which was associated with the People's National Party. He also wrote several plays, reviews, and short stories for Edna Manley's cultural journal, Focus, and the newspaper, The Daily Gleaner; his topics most frequently were the social injustice and inequality suffered by black, poor Jamaicans. He appealed to his local audience on grounds to push for a national identity and agitate against colonialism.

Mais published more than a hundred short stories, most appearing in Public Opinion and Focus. Other stories are collected in Face and Other Stories and And Most of All Man, published in the 1940s. Mais' play George William Gordon was also published in the 1940s, focusing on a politician and martyr of the Morant Bay Rebellion of 1865. It played an important role in the rehabilitation of the eponymous character. In conventional colonial history Gordon was described as a rebel and traitor, but on the centenary of the rebellion, he was declared to be a Jamaican National Hero.

On 11 July 1944, Roger Mais published an article titled "Now We Know," a denunciation of the British Empire, in Public Opinion, in which he claimed that it was now clear that the Second World War was not a fight for freedom but a war to preserve imperial privilege and exploitation:

That the sun may never set upon privilege, repression and exploitation and upon the insolence and arrogance of one race to all others... That the sun may never set upon the great British tradition of Democracy which chains men and women and little children with more than physical chains, chains of ignorance and the apathy of the underfed, and the submissiveness, which is a spiritual sickness in the thews and sinews of a man; chains them in dungeons of gold mines and silver mines and diamond mines, and upon sugar plantations, and upon rubber plantations and tea plantations. For the great idea of Democracy which relegates all "niggers" of whichever race, to their proper place in the scheme of political economy.

Accused of sedition for writing this denunciation of Churchill's declaration that the end of the Second World War would not mean the end of the British Empire, the Jamaican novelist was tried, convicted and imprisoned for six months. This period was instrumental in his development of his first novel, The Hills Were Joyful Together (1953), a work about working-class life in 1940s Kingston. "Why I Love and Leave Jamaica", an article written in 1950, also stirred emotions in readers. It characterized the bourgeoisie and the "philistines" as shallow and criticized their influential role on art and culture.

Mais wrote more than thirty stage and radio plays. The plays Masks and Paper Hats and Hurricane were performed in 1943, Atlanta in Calydon in 1950; The Potter's Field was published in Public Opinion (1950) and The First Sacrifice in Focus (1956).

Mais left Jamaica for England in 1952. He lived in London, then in Paris, and for a time in the south of France. He took an alias, Kingsley Croft, and exhibited an art exhibition in Paris. His artwork also appeared on the covers of his novels. In 1953, his novel The Hills Were Joyful Together was published by Jonathan Cape in London. Soon afterwards, Brother Man (1954) was published, a sympathetic exploration of the emergent Rastafarian movement. The next year Black Lightning was published. While Mais' first two novels had urban settings, Black Lightning (1955) featured an artist living in the countryside. In 1955 Mais was forced to return to Jamaica after falling ill with cancer; he died that same year in Kingston at the age of 50. In 1968 he was posthumously awarded the Musgrave Gold Medal by the Institute of Jamaica.

His short stories were collected in a volume entitled Listen, The Wind, thirty-two years after his death. Mais' novels have been republished posthumously several times, an indication of his importance to Caribbean literary history. He also had an influence on younger writers of the pre-independence period, notably John Hearne. Many of Mais' manuscripts have been deposited in the library of the University of the West Indies, Jamaica and there is an online collection. The University of the West Indies, Trinidad also holds a Roger Mais Collection.

== Novels ==
The Hills Were Joyful Together (1953) is written in the style of a narrative. It takes place in a "yard" consisting of individuals and families living in a confinement of shacks shaped squarely, leaving a yard in the center. In this yard, daily and public life of the tenement unfolds. Mais took inspiration from Trinidadian C. L. R. James's novel Minty Alley and short story "Triumph", which illustrated "yard" life. Mais's The Hills Were Joyful Together is basically a depiction of slum life, portraying the upset of poverty in these yards. Mais claimed that he was "concerned with setting down objectively the hopes, fears, [and] frustrations of these people". He wanted the novel to be "essentially realistic, even to the point of seeming violent, rude, expletive, functional, primitive, raw".

Brother Man (London: Cape, 1954) was hailed as a statement of protest, as well as a major contributor to an indigenous aesthetic. Mais was interested in the creole, the political reconstructionism of the 1930s, and the sociocultural problems of the urban poor. There was talk about a renewed self-government and the formation of a West Indian federation, provoking writers and intellectuals from the region to reflect on this optimistic future and to search for forms to give it a local face. Brother Man was Mais's contribution to this movement. The novel is situated in Kingston's slums. It portrays the daily condition of poverty of the society, particularly in the urban "tenement yards." Kamau Brathwaite refers to this as the "jazz novel", where the "words are 'notes' that develop into riffs, themes, and 'choruses,' themselves part of a call/response design based on the aesthetic principle of solo/duo/trio improvisations, with a return, at the end of each 'chorus,' to the basic group/ensemble community."

Unlike the first two novels, Black Lightning (1955) takes place in the countryside. The novel centers on Jake, a blacksmith and a sculptor. He looks to Samson as a model of a man's independence and decides to carve a structure of Samson in mahogany. But when his wife elopes with another man, Jake's finished sculpture comes out as a blinded Samson leaning on a little boy. Jake is then blinded by lightning and has to depend on his friends to live. The tragic discovery of his dependence on humanity eventually drives Jake to his suicidal death.

== Political involvement ==
In 1938, major riots and uprising broke out all throughout the Caribbean islands (primarily in Jamaica, Barbados, and Trinidad). In Jamaica, riots emerged in the 1938 Montego Bay and among the banana loaders, firemen, and sanitation workers in Kingston. It was in Kingston, where Mais was headed to volunteer to help quell the rioting, that he had an apparent change of heart. He seemingly emerged with a completely alternative mindset, as explained in John Hearne's 1955 "A Personal Memoir", and took the side of the workers/rioters. Many saw this as the event that spurred Mais' political involvement. At the end of this critical year, new leaders, including Mais, appropriately emerged to direct and push for political and social changes.

Roger Mais' works, which include short stories, plays, reviews, and "think pieces" among other genres, all generally have a political undertone to some degree. He contributed to a left-wing political newspaper called Public Opinion from 1939 to 1952 before he left Jamaica. The other writers of the post-1930s had similar ambitions, a period being characterized as "a more determined and confident nationalism."

His stories appeared in Public Opinion and Focus, two journalistic publications. He also published two collections, Face and Other Stories and And Most of All Man. His main concerns were social injustice/inequality and colonialism. His stories and poems have been described as "propaganda", where he illustrated poverty to the full extent. Some have gone so far as to say that his works were "weapons of war", dealt "in a long and famous stream of realism" (Norman Washington Manley). This sort of realism allowed for his readers/audience to understand the poverty in a way which was brutally honest. Examples of these works are The Hills Were Joyful Together and Brother Man. He adamantly denounced England as "exploitive", "enslaving", and disloyal and Winston Churchill for "hypocrisy and deception". Subsequently, Mais was charged with sedition and sentenced to a six-month sentence. The Jamaican public was sympathetic to his imprisonment and helped to incite controversy and public commotion.

It is in this sense that Mais was able to involve the Rastafari movement, a Jamaican cultural movement, in his novel Brother Man, in which he is able to identify with the anti-colonialism and afrocentrism of the Rastafari movement.

Arguably, another important political contribution was his work to build a national identity, and he did this by: "'nativizing' the subjects and concerns of his writing", "supplying a corrective to colonialism by [...] reclaiming subverted or disregarded histories", and "gave authority to the island's language and voice" (Hawthorne). This essentially means he would intentionally present protagonists that spoke in the local West Indian dialect to connect with his local audience, a significant change in attitude from previous works by other authors. Mais would also include nationalist propaganda demonstrating forgotten Jamaican culture and history. Other similar influential writers of Jamaican heritage include Vera Bell, Claude Thompson, Una Marson, John Hearne, Philip Sherlock, John Figueroa, and Louise Bennett-Coverly.

== Influences ==
Raised into a middle-class family with full access to "cultured" traditions, Mais often incorporated a romantic idea into his writings. He drew from his Western education inspirations that lead to his use of "tragic," "visionary," and "poetic" elements within books and plays. His belief in individualism and the writer's freedom to pursue imagination are reflected in many of his early works. However, Mais later recognized the tension between his colonial heritage and the nationalist movement and changed direction. By adopting a realistic stance, Mais decided to assume a literary style that would be more representative of the Caribbean national consciousness. This particular form allowed Mais to present "unambiguous, direct truths about the people and culture." Many of his later novels thus portray sufferings and despairs undergone by people living under colonialism. One inspiration that he wove into his writings sprang from the 1938 People's National Party that was launched by Norman Manley. The movement aimed to grant Jamaica self-government, which sparked concurrent enthusiasm within the literary field. Besides Roger Mais another author, Vic Reid also incorporated into his works Manley's ambitious drive to independence. Reid's novel New Day is a historical account of Jamaica from 1865 to 1944. Like Mais, Reid finds primary sources particularly useful in modeling political messages into stories.

== Mais and Caribbean drama ==
During the 1930s, the first endeavours were made to write and introduce plays related to Caribbean life. Before that period, plays were European-based, with European actors as well. Shows consisted of Romeo and Juliet and reading of Shakespearian plays, but progress towards expressing Caribbean life was being made. The year symbolized an advance for Caribbean theatre. The desire to represent local life and history of the Caribbeans onstage were produced, and the theatre's capability to entertain and to raise concerning questions were acknowledged. George William Gordon acts as a representation for the lower class, alluding to the oppressions they were forced to endure throughout the play. The form of George William Gordon indicates that the scenes are meant to be performed in public. Therefore, the play not only represents the people, but also functions as a voice for the people so that their cries can be heard. The unfair court system, the low wages and their repercussions are stated clearly in the work by anonymous persons acting as a uniting voice for the people. It forms an identity for the Black underclass majority, which was Mais's ultimate goal in his work.

== Selected bibliography ==
- George William Gordon, manuscript for play, from the University of the West Indies
- And Most of All Man. Kingston: City Printery.
- Face and Other Stories (1946). Kingston: Universal Printery.
- The Hills Were Joyful Together (1953). London: Jonathan Cape.
- Brother Man (1954). London: Jonathan Cape.
- Black Lightning (1955). London: Jonathan Cape.
- "George William Gordon", in Errol Hill (ed.), A Time... and a Season: 8 Caribbean Plays, Trinidad: University of the West Indies Press, 1976.
