= Alexander Wienerberger =

Austrian chemical engineer and right wing nationalist

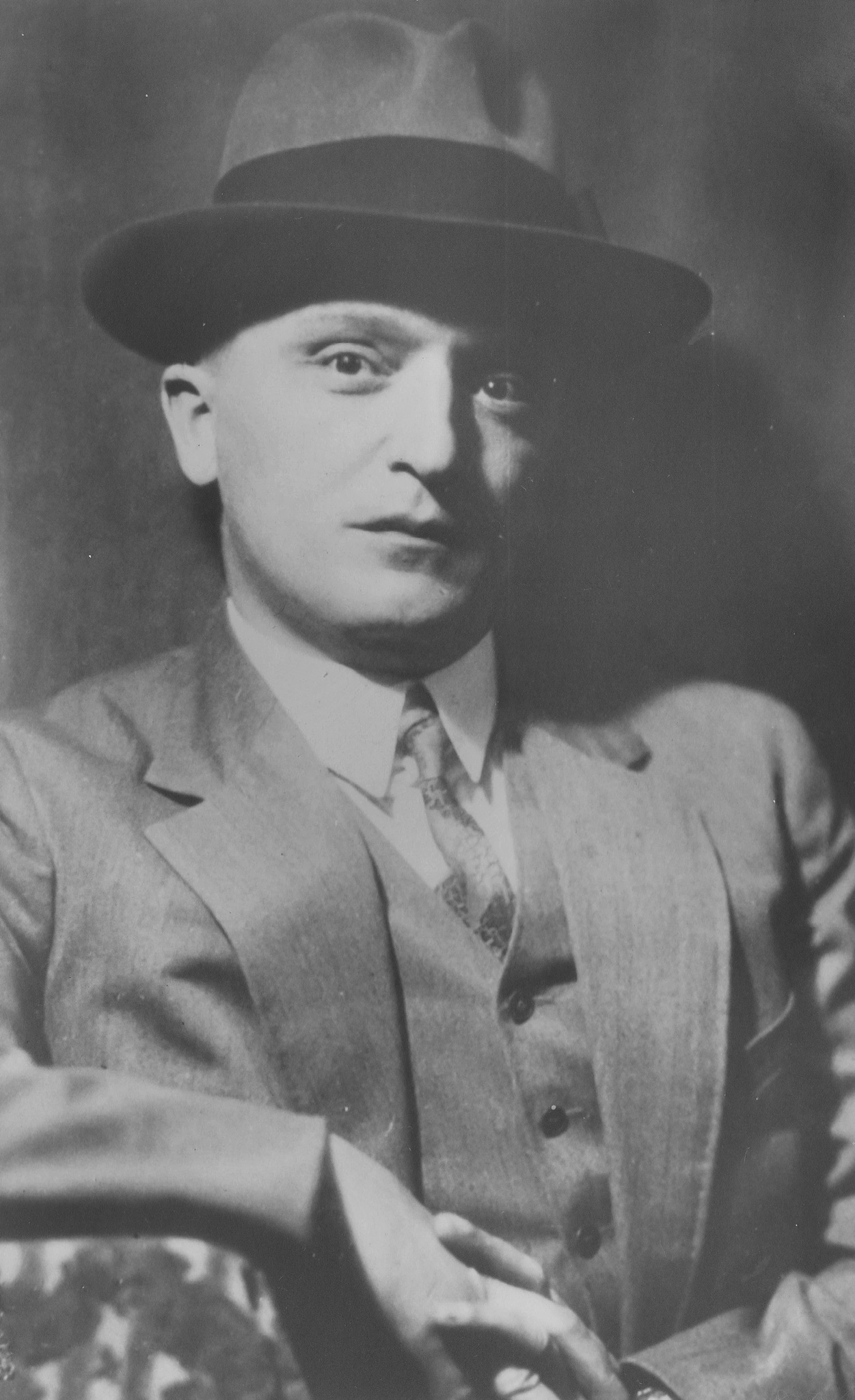
- Born: December 8, 1891; Vienna, Austria-Hungary
- Died: January 5, 1955 (aged 63); Salzburg, Austria

Alexander Wienerberger (December 8, 1891 – January 5, 1955) was an Austrian chemical engineer, who worked for 19 years in the chemical industry of the Soviet Union. While he worked in Kharkiv, he created a series of photographs of the massive man-made genocidal famine, the Holodomor (Голодомор) of 1932–1933, which serves as photographic evidence of the mass starvation and deaths of the Ukrainian people committed by Joseph Stalin and the Soviet communist authorities at that time, in their attempt to destroy Ukraine and its people. The famine was the worst and most deadly in the central, southern, and eastern parts of Ukraine.

== Life ==
Wienerberger was born in 1891 (other sources mistakenly indicate 1898) in Vienna, into a family of mixed origin. Despite the fact that his father was Jewish and his mother Czech, Alexander himself, according to his daughter, considered himself an Austrian and an atheist.

From 1910 to 1914, he studied at the Faculty of Philosophy at the University of Vienna. During the First World War he was mobilized into the Austro-Hungarian Army, participated in battles against the Russian Army, and was captured in 1915.

In 1917, he was allowed to move to Moscow, where he founded a chemical laboratory with friends. In the autumn of 1919, he attempted to escape from Soviet Russia to Austria through Estonia using fake documents, but failed: he was arrested in Pskov by the Soviet secret-police. Convicted of espionage, he spent a significant part of the 1920s in the Lubyanka prison in Moscow. During his incarceration, Wienerberger's skills as a chemist were appreciated by the Soviet government, which employed foreign prisoners in the chemical industry. He was appointed an engineer for the production of varnishes and paints, and he later worked in factories for the production of explosives.

His first marriage to Josefine Rönimois, a native of the Baltic Germans, broke up in 1927. His ex-wife, together with daughter Annemarie and son Alexander, remained in Estonia (Annemarie later moved to Austria). In 1928, for the first time since his imprisonment, Wienerberger visited his relatives in Vienna and entered a second marriage to Lilly Zimmermann, the daughter of a manufacturer from Schwechat. Wienerberger's restrictions were lifted on his return to Moscow, which allowed his wife to move to the Soviet Union. In 1931, Lilly was allowed to briefly return to Vienna, where she gave birth to their daughter Margot.

In the early 1930s, the Wienerberger family lived in Moscow, where Alexander held a position at a chemical factory. He was sent to Lyubuchany (Moscow Oblast) in 1932 to take up the position of technical director of a plastics factory, and he transferred to a similar position in Kharkiv in 1933. Weinerberger joined the Nazi Party in 1938, but was expelled in 1942, due to his Jewish heritage.

=== Photographic evidence of Holodomor, 1932–1933 ===
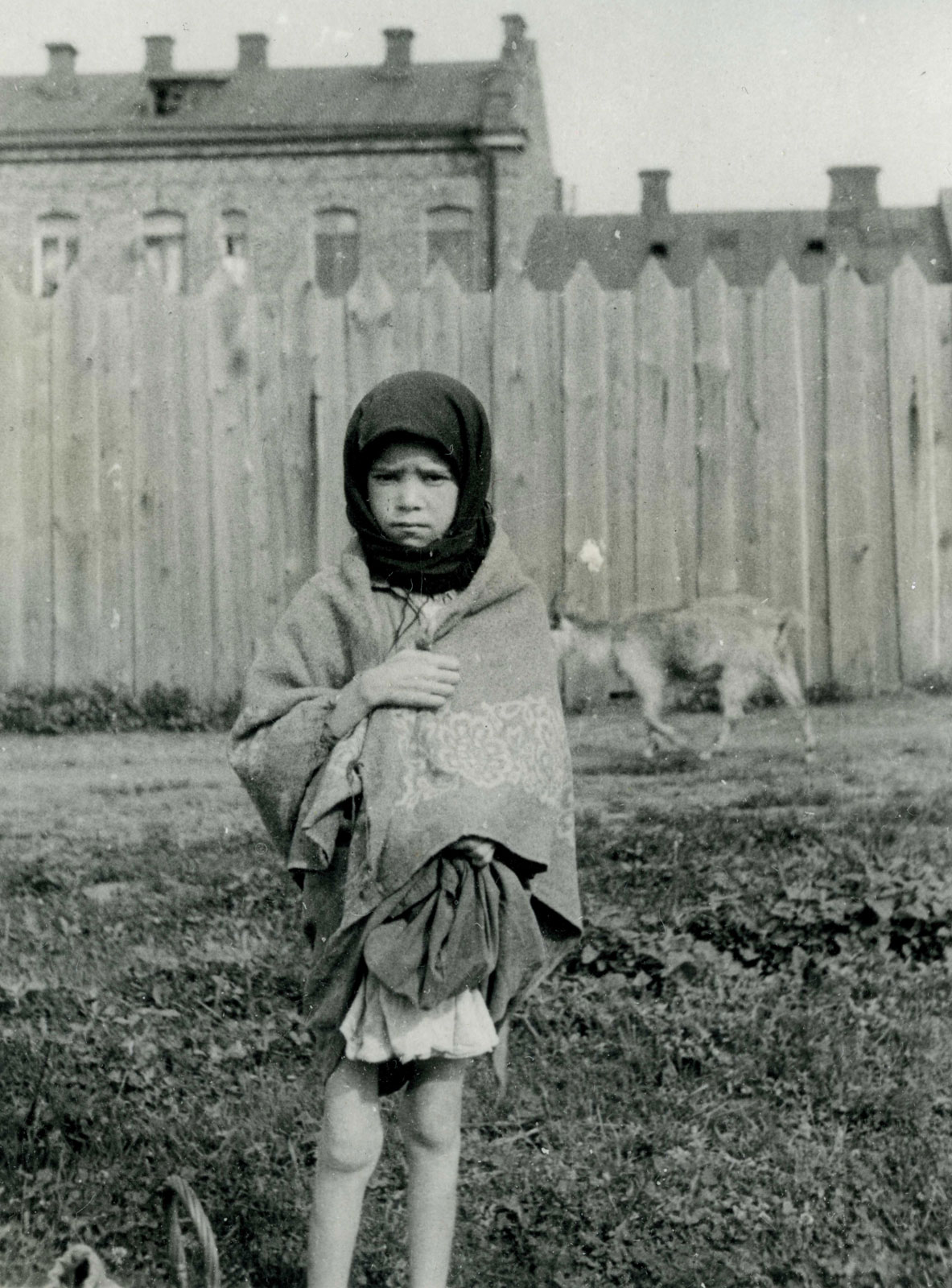
This photograph of a starving girl from Kharkiv is one of the most famous photographs of the Holodomor (by Alexander Wienerberger).

Living in Kharkiv, the then capital of the Ukrainian Soviet Socialist Republic, Wienerberger witnessed a massive famine, the Holodomor, and secretly took about 100 photographs of the scenes he saw on the streets of the city, despite the threat of arrest by the NKVD. His photographs depict queues of hungry people at grocery stores, starving children, dead bodies lying on the ground, and mass graves of the victims of the Holodomor. Wienerberger created his photographs using the German Leica camera, which was probably transferred to him by friends from abroad.

Leaving for Austria in 1934, Wienerberger sent negatives through the diplomatic mail with the aid of the Austrian embassy. Austrian diplomats insisted on such a measure of caution, since there was a high probability of a search of personal belongings at the border, and eventual discovery of photographs could threaten his life. On his return to Vienna, Wienerberger handed the pictures to Cardinal Theodor Innitzer, who, together with the Secretary General of the European Congress of Nations, Ewald Ammende, presented them to the League of Nations. Ammende's book, "Must Russia Starve?" appeared in 1935.

In 1934, the Patriotic Front, a far-right news paper in Austria released Wienerberger's photographs in a small brochure entitled "Rußland, wie es wirklich ist" ("Russia, as it really is"), but without attribution. The photographs were first made widely available to the public in 1935, through the publication of Ammende's book, "Muss Russland Hungern?" ("Must Russia Starve?"); however, the photos were not credited because of concerns for the safety of their creator.

Wienerberger's family escaped the Austrian Anschluss in 1938, and moved to the United Kingdom.

In 1939, Wienerberger published in Austria his own book of memoirs about life in the Soviet Union, in which two chapters are devoted to the Holodomor. The "memoir is filled with anti-Semitic commentary in general, and against 'Judeo-Bolsheviks' in particular. His introduction to the series boasts that his photos had appeared in the recent Antikomintern and 'Der ewige Jude' [the eternal Jew] exhibits that traveled through Germany and Austria." Photographs were also included in his memoirs published in 1942.

In 1944, Wienerberger served as liaison officer of the Nazi-aligned Russian Liberation Army. After the war, he managed to avoid the transfer to Soviet troops and ended up in the American zone of occupation in Salzburg, where he died in 1955.

Since his death, Wienerberger's photos have been republished in many other works. They are exhibited, in particular, in the Canadian Museum for Human Rights in Winnipeg.

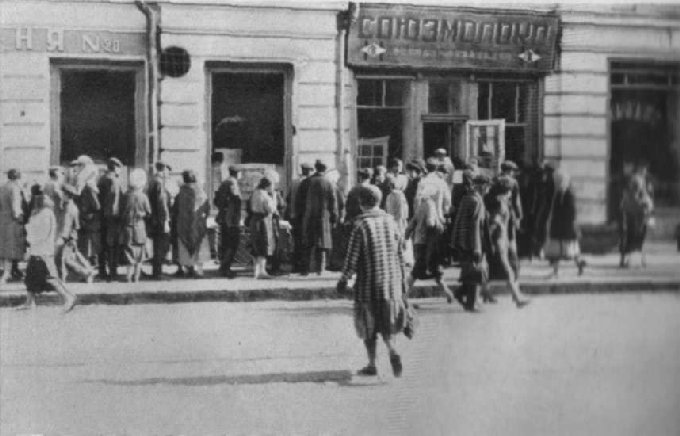

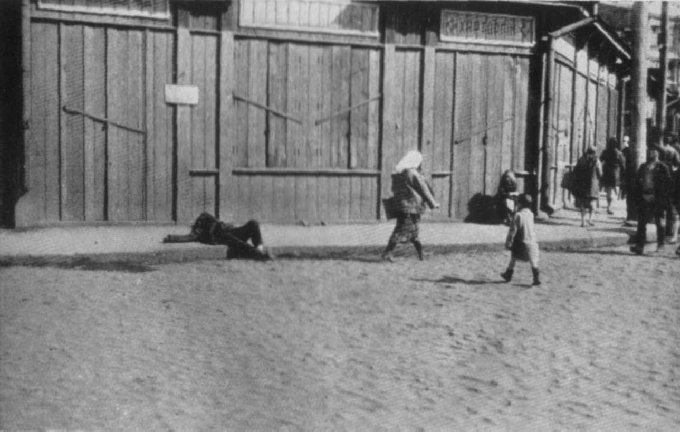

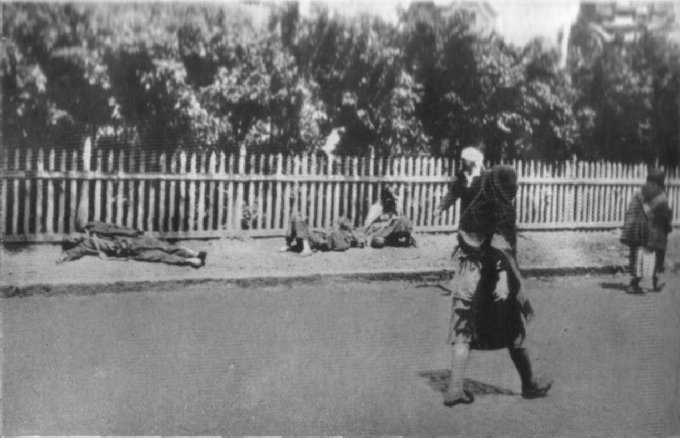

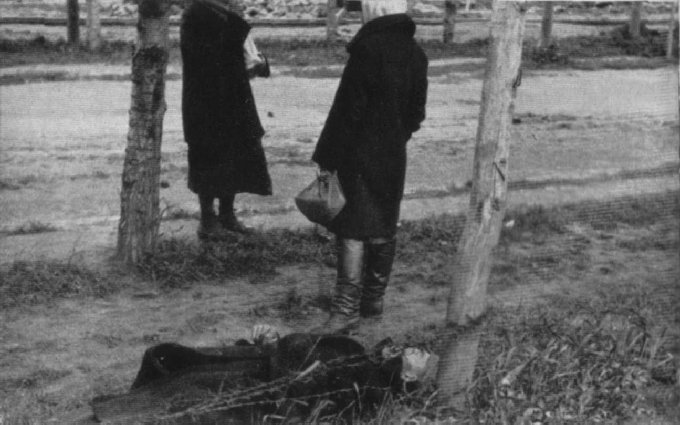

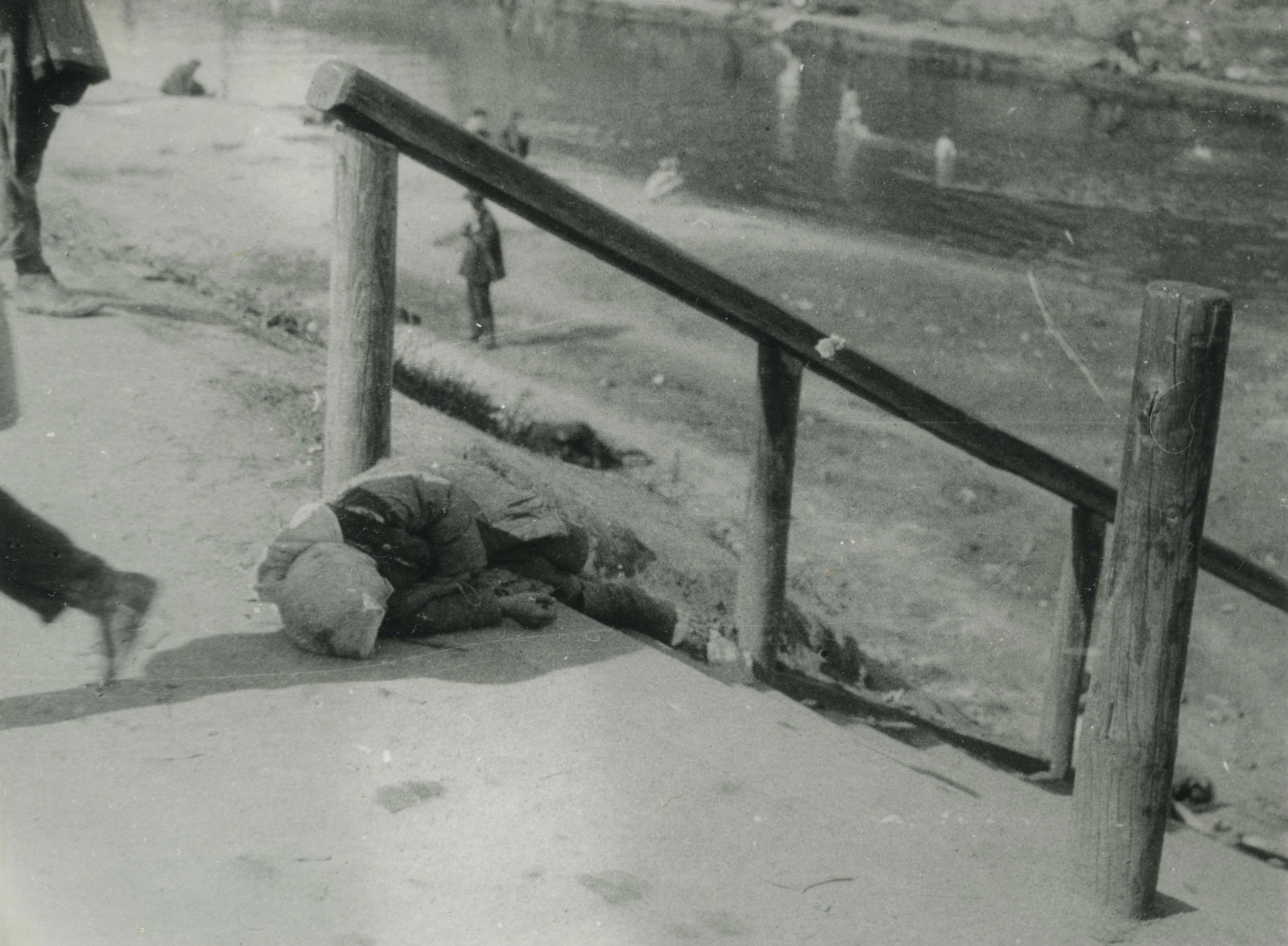

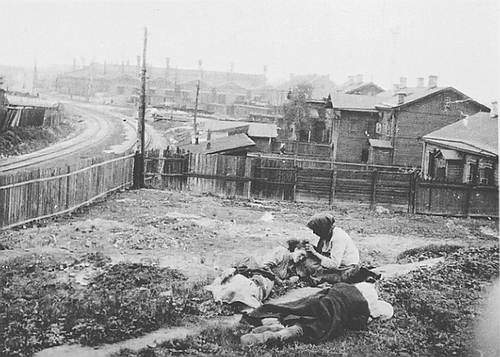

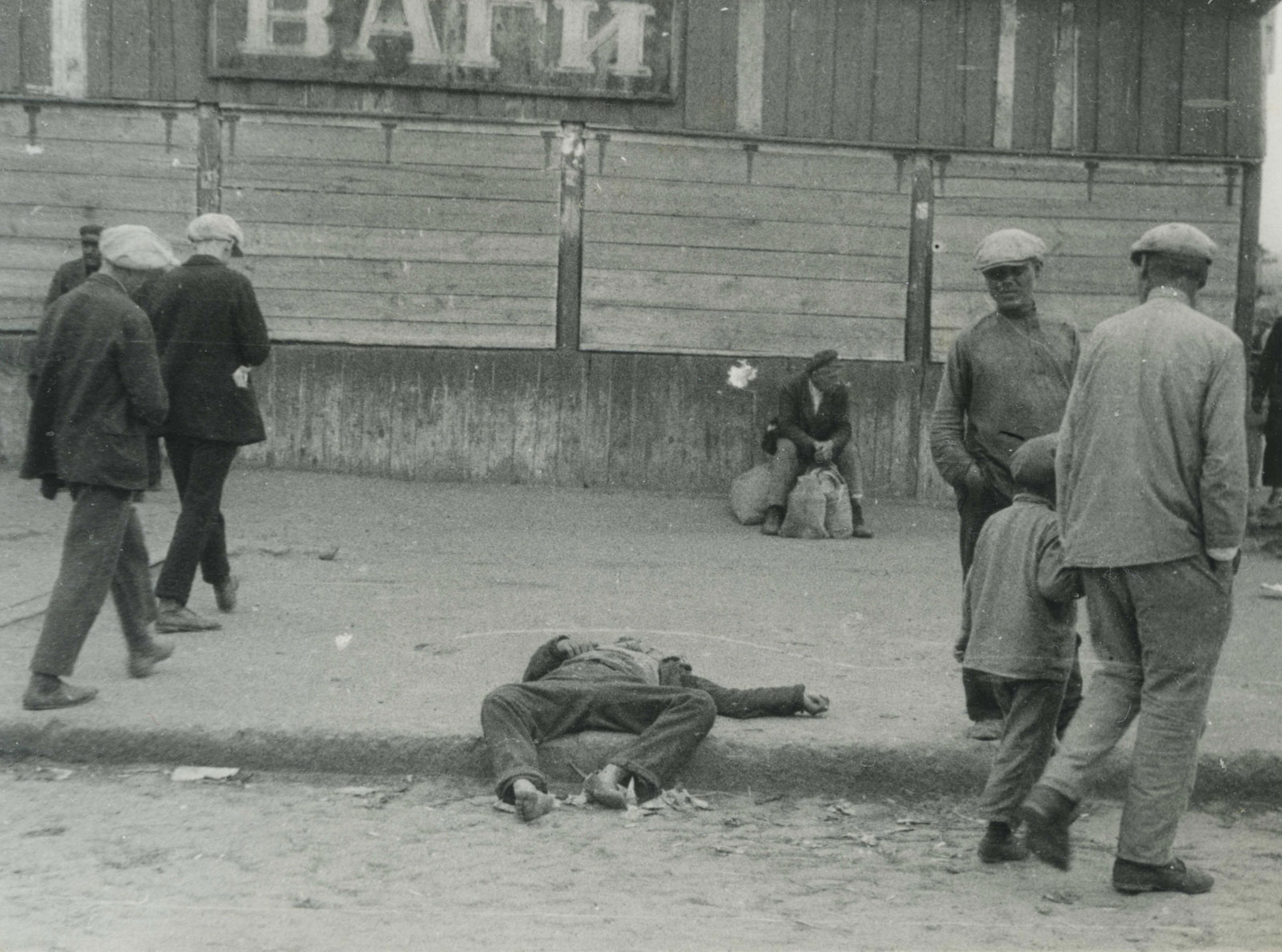

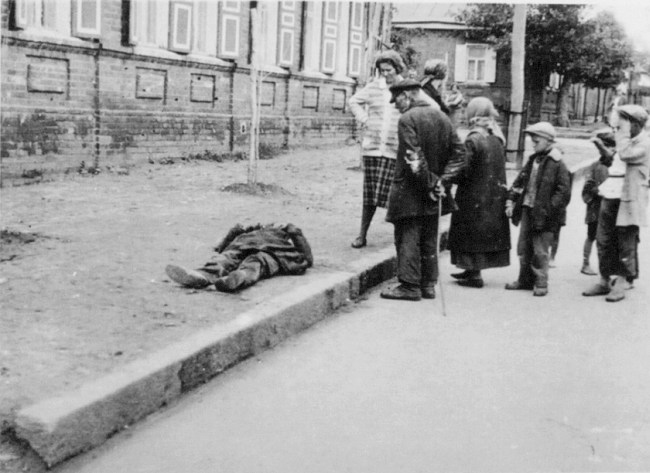

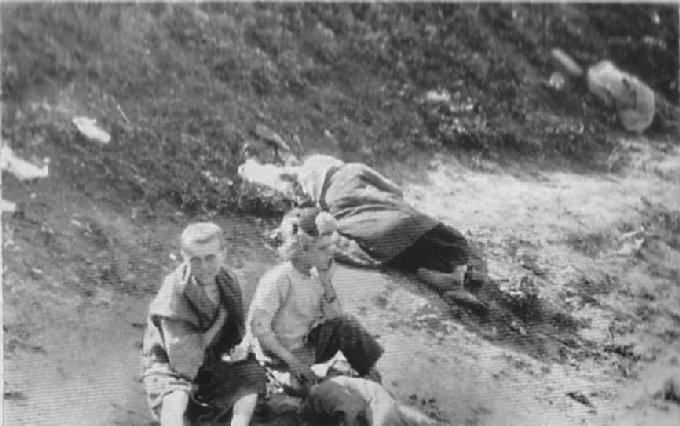

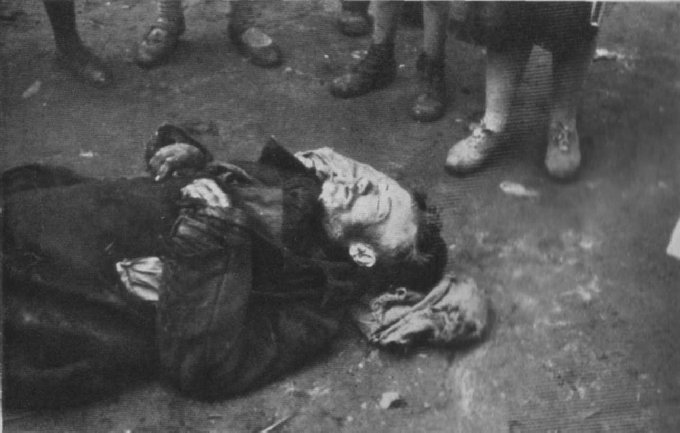
