= Jaime Ovalle =

Brazilian composer and poet

Jaime Ovalle or Jayme Ovalle (5 August 1894 – 9 September 1955) was a Brazilian composer and poet.

Ovalle was born in Belém, Brazil.

He was self-taught as a composer. As an officer of the Ministério da Fazenda, he resided mostly in New York and London. He was one of the "Second Nationalist Generation" of Brazilian composers along with Oscar Lorenzo Fernandez (1897-1948) and Walter Burle-Marx (1902-1990).

He died in Rio de Janeiro.

== Works, editions and recordings ==
Ovalle's best known song is Azulão, "bluebird", a canção to a text by Manuel Bandeira. It has been recorded by Conchita Badia, Victoria de los Angeles, Arleen Auger, Montserrat Caballé, Kathleen Battle, Isabel Bayrakdarian, Angela Gheorghiu and many other sopranos. It has also been transposed to be sung by other voices - such as by Gérard Souzay, Andrés Jiménez-Ramírez and by Addiss & Crofut, 1966.

Other works:

- Pedro Álvares Cabral (symphonic poem)
- Legenda (for piano)
- Modinha (canção, also to a text by Manuel Bandeira)
