= Mahammad Amin Rasulzade =

Azerbaijani politician (1884–1955)

- Məhəmməd Əmin Rəsulzadə
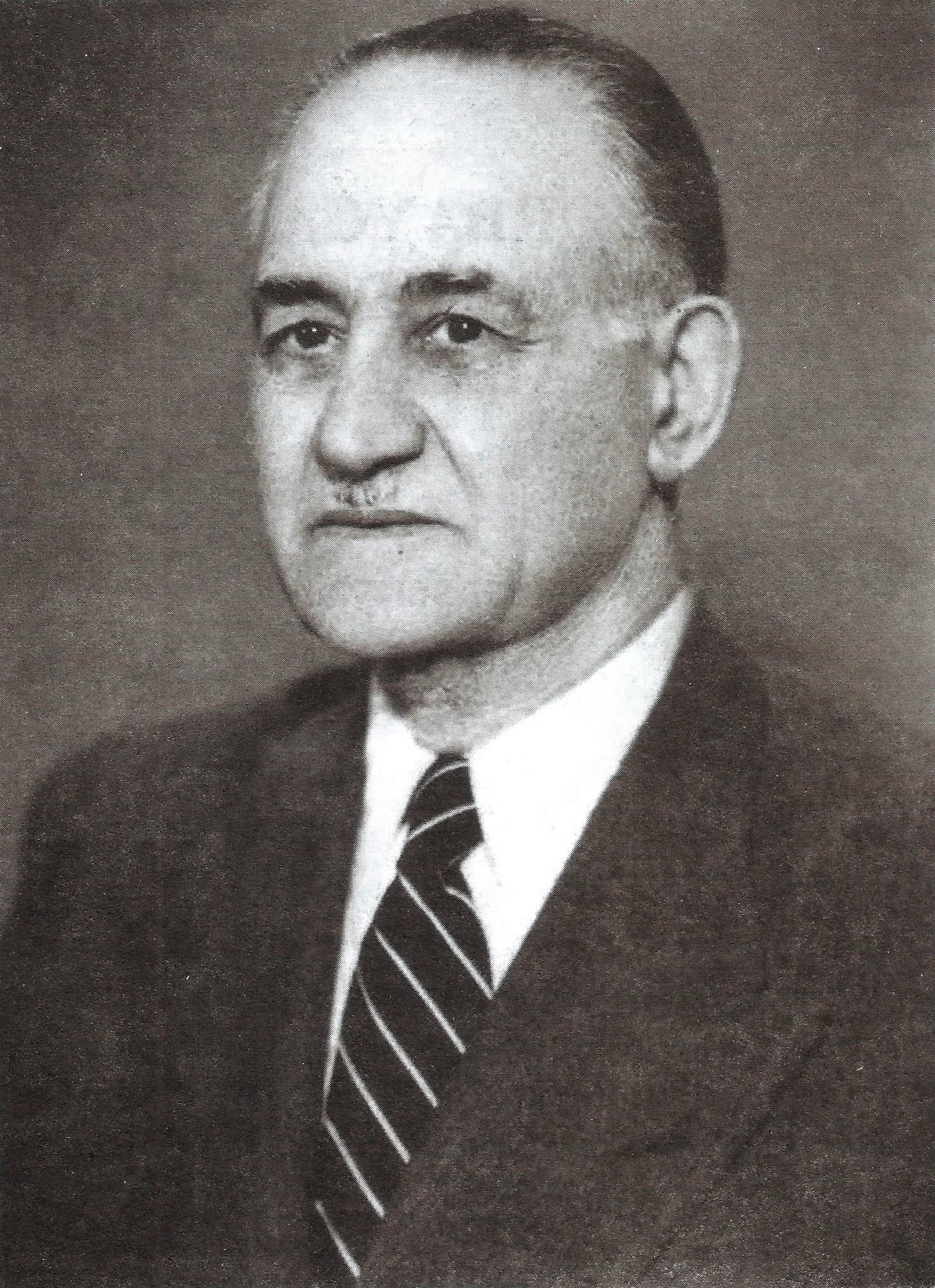
- Rasulzade c. 1950

President of Azerbaijani National Council
- In office 27 May 1918 – 7 December 1918

Personal details
- Born: 31 January 1884 Novkhany, Baku uezd, Baku Governorate, Caucasus Viceroyalty, Russian Empire (now Azerbaijan)
- Died: 6 March 1955 (aged 71) Ankara, Turkey
- Resting place: Cebeci Asri Cemetery
- Party: Musavat Party; Democrat Party
- Spouse: Umbulbanu Rasulzade
- Profession: The Leader of Azerbaijan
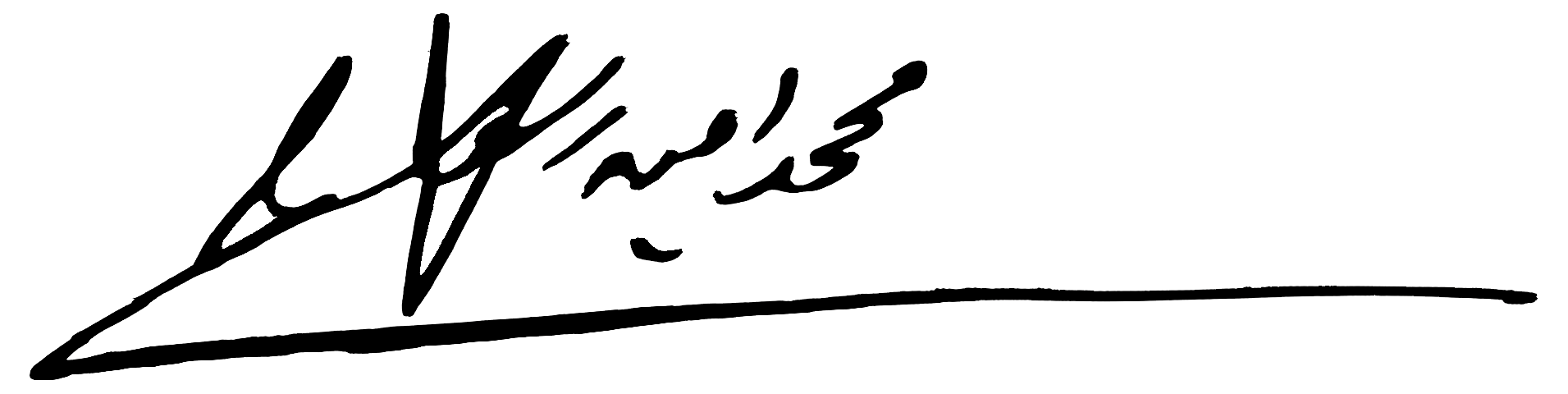
- Signature

Mahammad Amin Akhund Haji Molla Alakbar oghlu Rasulzade (Note: Azerbaijani: محمد امین آخوند حاجی ملا علی اکبر اوغلی رسولزاده, Məhəmməd Əmin Axund Hacı Molla Ələkbər oğlu Rəsulzadə, IPA: [mæhæmˈmæd æˈmin ɾæsulzɑːˈdæ]; Turkish: Mehmet Emin Ahund Hacı Molla Alekber oğlu Resulzâde; Russian: Мамед Эмин Ахунд Гаджи Молла Алекбер оглы Расулзаде, romanized: Mamed Emin Akhund Gadzhi Molla Alekber ogly Rasulzade) (31 January 1884 – 6 March 1955) was an Azerbaijani politician, journalist and the head of the Azerbaijani National Council. He is mainly considered the founder of Azerbaijan Democratic Republic in 1918 and the father of its statehood. His expression "Bir kərə yüksələn bayraq, bir daha enməz!" ("The flag once raised shall never fall!") became the motto of the independence movement in Azerbaijan in the early 20th century. He faced numerous exiles from both Turkey and Iran. During World War II, Rasulzade attempted to form a strategic alliance with Nazi Germany in order to garner support for an independent Azerbaijan.

== Early life ==
Born on 31 January 1884 to Akhund Haji Molla Alakbar Rasulzadeh in Novkhany, near Baku, Mahammad Amin Rasulzade received his education at the Russian-Muslim Secondary School and then at the Technical College in Baku. In his years of study he created "Muslim Youth Organisation Musavat", the first secret organisation in Azerbaijan's contemporary history, and beginning from 1903 Rasulzade began writing articles in various opposition newspapers and magazines. At that time, his anti-monarchist platform and his demands for the national autonomy of Azerbaijan, aligned him with Social Democrats and future Communists. In 1904 he founded the first Muslim social-democrat organisation "Hummet" and became editor-in-chief of its newspapers, Takamul (1906–1907) and Yoldash (1907). Rasulzade also published many articles in non-partisan newspapers such as Hayat, Irshad, and the journal Fuyuzat. His dramatic play titled The Lights in the Darkness was staged in Baku in 1908.

Rasulzade and his co-workers were representatives of the Azerbaijani intelligentsia. Most of them, including Rasulzade himself, had been members of the Baku organization of the Russian Social-Democratic Workers' Party (Bolsheviks) in 1905. A photograph is extant in Soviet archives, showing Rasulzade with Prokopius Dzhaparidze and Meshadi Azizbekov, Bolsheviks who later became famous as two of the 26 Baku Commissars shot during the civil war. During the First Russian Revolution (1905–1907), Rasulzade actively participated in revolutionary developments. As the story goes, it was Rasulzade who saved young Joseph Stalin in 1905 in Baku, when police were searching for the latter as an active instigator of riots.

In 1909, under the persecution from Tsarist authorities, Rasulzade fled Baku to participate in the Iranian Constitutional Revolution of 1905–1911. While in Iran, Rasulzade edited Iran-e Azad, or "Independent Iran", newspaper, became one of the founders of Democrat Party of Persia and began publishing its newspaper Iran-e Now which means "New Iran" and which has been described as "the greatest, most important and best known of the Persian newspapers, and the first to appear in the large size usual in Europe". In 1911, Rasulzade also published his book "Saadet-e bashar" ("Happiness of Mankind") in defense of the revolution. Rasulzade was fluent in Persian.

After Russian troops entered Iran in 1911 and, in cooperation with British, assisted Qajar Court to put an end to Iranian Constitutional Revolution, Rasulzade fled to Istanbul, then capital of Ottoman Empire. Here, in the wake of Young Turk Revolution, Rasulzade founded a journal called Türk Yurdu (The Land of Turks), in which he published his famous article "İran Türkleri" about the Iranian Turks.

== The Musavat Party and Azerbaijan Democratic Republic ==
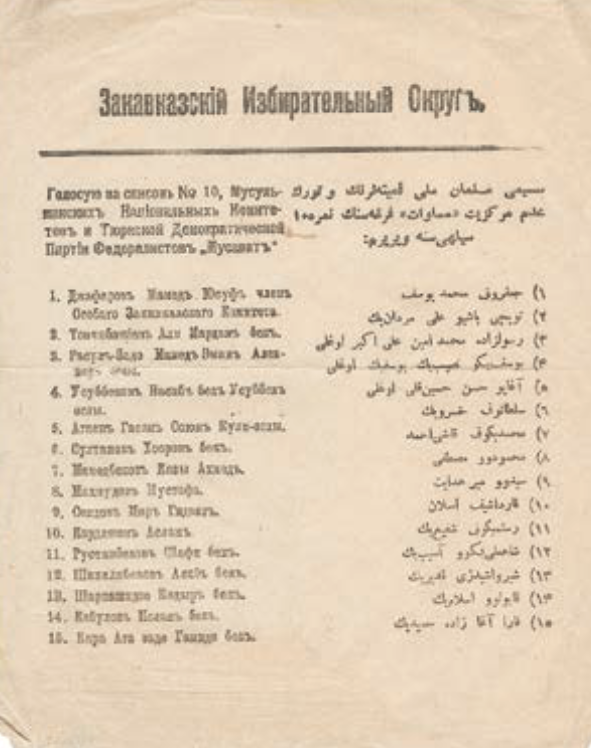
Election ballot for the 1917 Russian Constituent Assembly election, written in both Azerbaijani and Russian, with Rasulzade listed under number 3.

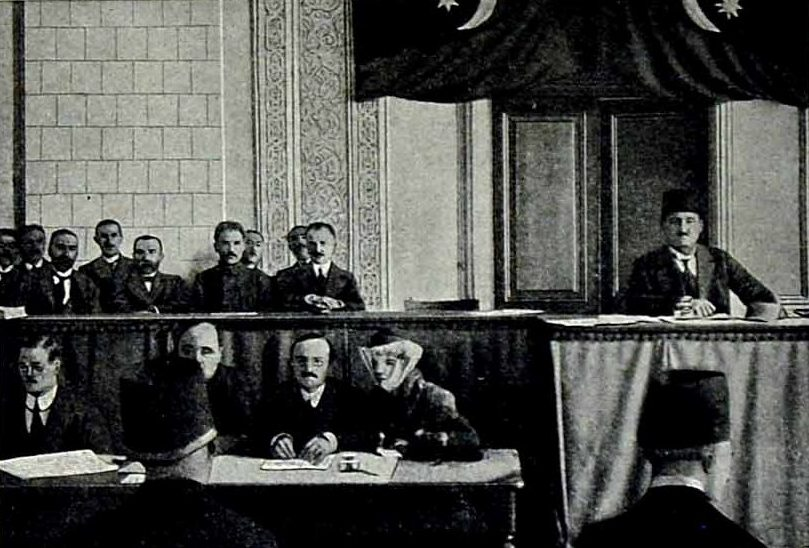
Opening of the Parliament of the Azerbaijan Democratic Republic

After the Amnesty Act of 1913, dedicated to the 300th anniversary of the Romanov dynasty, Rasulzade returned to Baku, left the Hummet party he was previously member of, and joined the then secret Musavat (Equality) party in 1913, established in 1911, which initially promoted pan-Islamist, pan-Turkist and Socialist ideas, or more precisely Pan-Islamism yet with affinity for greater cultural bonds with the Turkic world, and which eventually became Azerbaijani nationalist party, and quickly became its chief. In 1915 he started to publish the party's newspaper "Açıq Söz" (Open word) which lasted until 1918. When the February Revolution happened, Musavat together with other secret political parties in the Russian Empire, were quickly legalized and became a leading party of Caucasian Muslims after it merged with Party of Turkic Federalists headed by Nasib Yusifbeyli. The October Revolution in 1917 lead to the secession of Transcaucasia from Russia and Rasulzade became head of Muslim faction in the Seym, the parliament of the Transcaucasian Federation. After the dissolution of the Transcaucasian Federation, the Muslim faction re-organized into the Azerbaijani National Council, whose head Rasulzade was unanimously elected in May 1918.

On 28 May 1918 the Azerbaijani National Council, headed by Rasulzade, declared an independent Azerbaijan Republic. Rasulzade also initiated the establishment of Baku State University together with Rashid Khan Gaplanov, minister of education with the funding of oil baron Haji Zeynalabdin Taghiyev in 1919. Rasulzade taught Ottoman literature at the university.

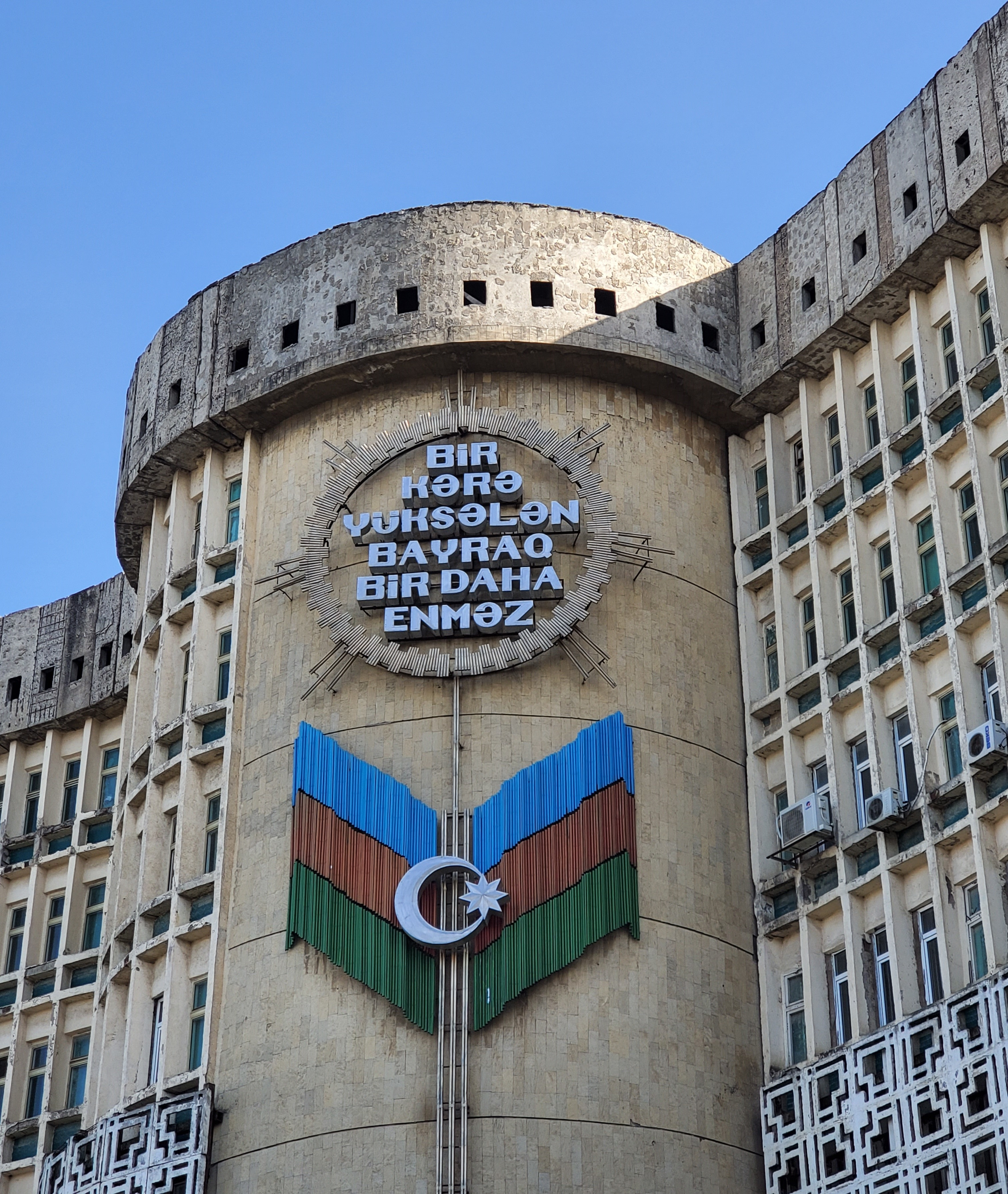
"The flag once raised will never fall!"

Bir kərə yüksələn bayraq, bir daha enməz! The flag once raised will never fall!

— Mahammad Amin Rasulzade

After the collapse of Azerbaijan Democratic Republic in April 1920, Rasulzade left Baku and went into hiding in the mountainous village of Lahıc, Ismailli to direct the resistance to Sovietization. But in August 1920, after the Soviet Russian army crushed the rebellions of Ganja, Karabakh, Zagatala and Lankaran, led by ex-officers of the Azerbaijani National Army, Rasulzade was arrested and brought to Baku. It was only due to an earlier rescue of Joseph Stalin, as Rasulzade hid Stalin from the police, that Rasulzade was released and transferred from Azerbaijan to Russia. For the next two years, Rasulzade worked as the press representative at the Commissariat on Nations in Moscow. He was seconded to Saint Petersburg in 1922 from where he escaped to Finland.

== Exile ==
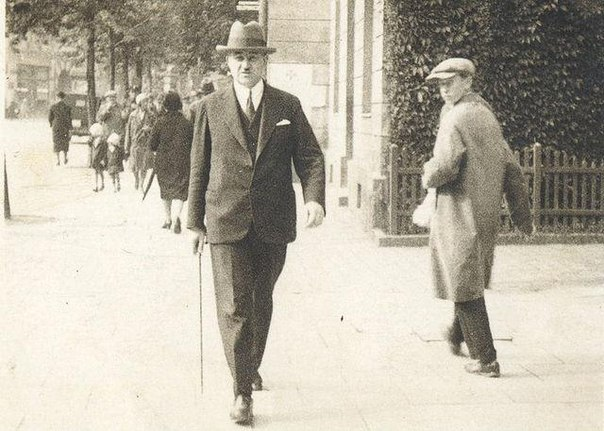
Mammad Amin Rasulzade in 1930s

For the rest of his life, Rasulzade lived in exile first in Turkey. Between 1923 and 1927, he was an editor-in-chief of the magazine called Yeni Kafkasya (Turkish: New Caucasus) which was suspended by the Kemalist government by the request of Moscow. Rasulzade continued to publish various articles, newspapers, and magazines from 1928 until 1931 in Turkey. However, the 1931 suppression of the emigre publications coincided with Rasulzade's expulsion from Turkey, and some saw it as the result of caving in to Soviet pressure. In exile Rasulzade published a pamphlet titled O Pantiurkizme v sviazi s kavkazskoi problemoi (О Пантюркизме в связи с кавказской проблемой, Pan-Turkism with regard to the Caucasian problem), in which he firmly stated his view: Pan-Turkism was a cultural movement rather than a political program. Thus, he went to Poland in 1938, where he met his wife, Wanda, niece of Polish statesman Józef Piłsudski, then to Romania in 1940.

During his exile in 1942, Rasulzade was contacted by the leadership of Nazi Germany, who, when forming national legions from representatives of the peoples of the Soviet Union, relied on well-known and authoritative representatives, such as Rasulzade and other leaders of the 1918 Caucasian republics. Hitler tried to recruit Rasulzade as a leader of a German-occupied Caucasus. Rasulzade was convinced of the close connection between Musavatism and Nazism. He noted that the social program of the Musavat party was of a national socialist nature. During a meeting with the German leadership in May 1942, Rasulzade attempted to form a strategic alliance with Nazi Germany in order to restore Azerbaijan's independence. Rasulzade demanded that Nazi Germany announce its absolute commitment to the restoration of the Transcaucasian states, however, due to the evasive nature of the Reich in the conversation, he left Berlin.

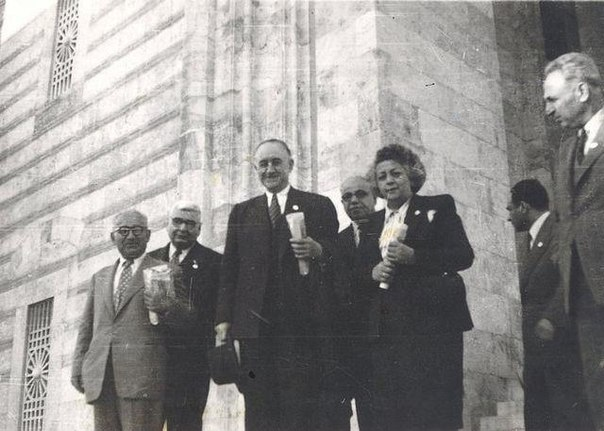
Resulzade with his compatriots in 1950s

Finally, after World War II, he went back to Ankara, Turkey in 1947, where he participated in the politics of the marginal Pan Turkic movement. Due to sensitivity of his presence in either Turkey or Iran, and being often exiled, Rasulzade "cherished bad memories of both Iran and Turkey". In his appeal to Azerbaijani people in 1953 through Voice of America, he stressed his hope that one day it will become independent again. He died in 1955, a broken man according to Thomas Goltz, and was buried in Cebeci Asri cemetery in Ankara.

== Legacy and honors ==
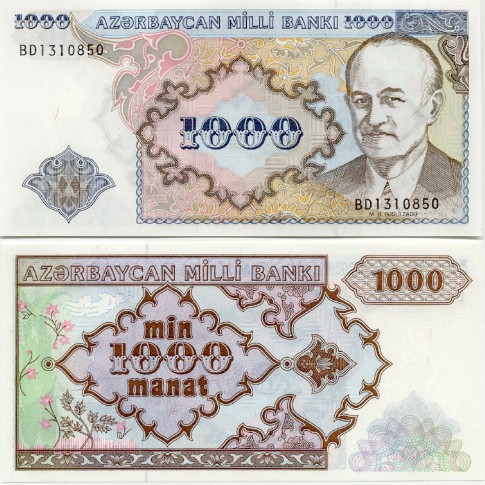
Azerbaijani currency: 1000 Manat (1993) featuring Mammed Amin Rasulzade until 2001

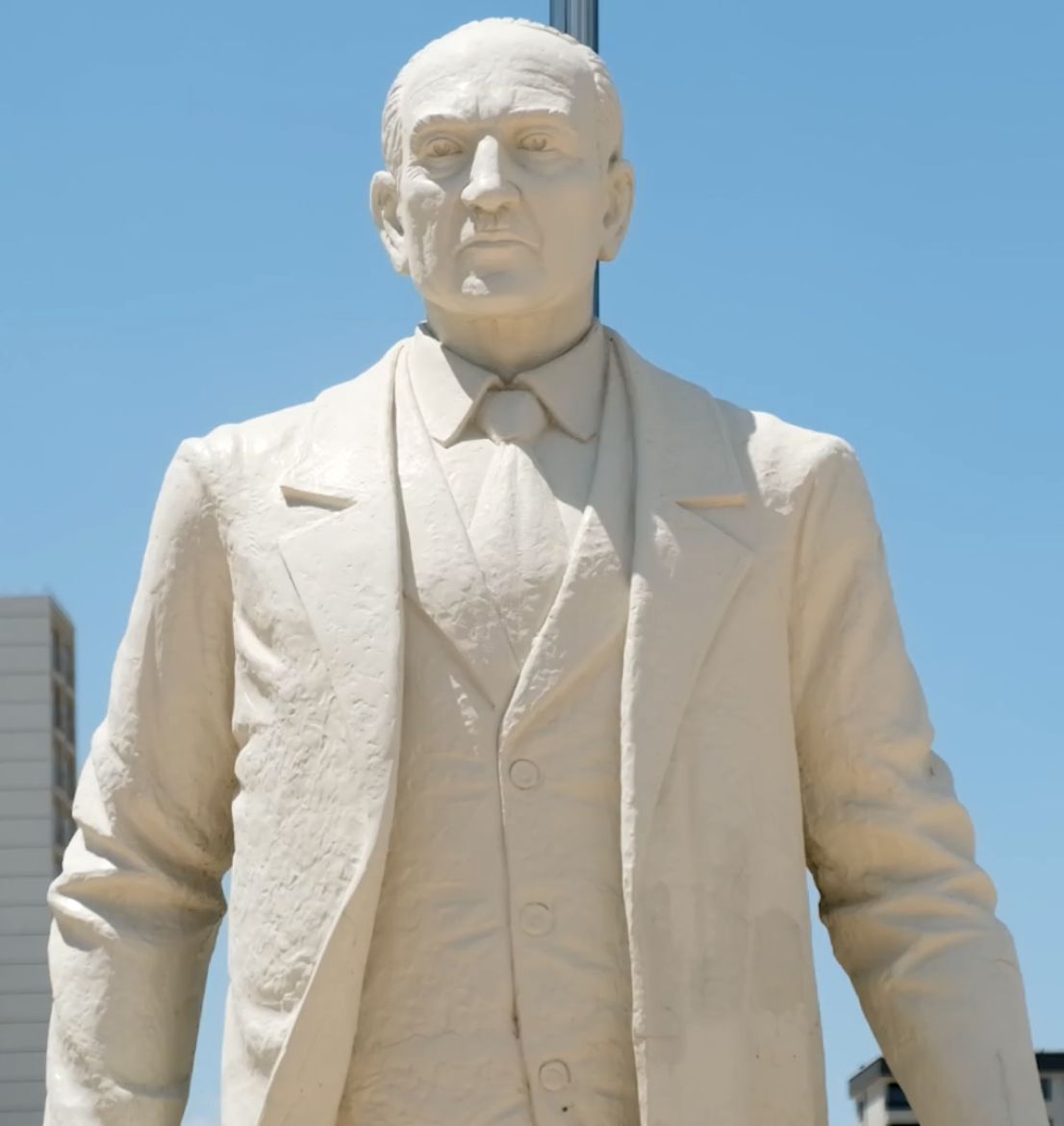
Stature of Resulzade in Ankara

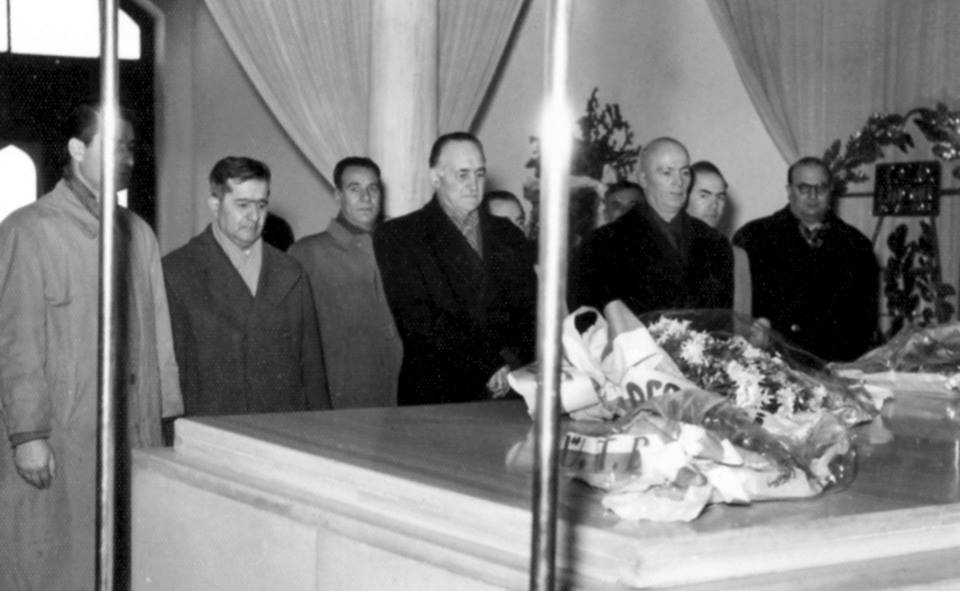
Muhammad Amin Rasulzadeh and his friends in front of Atatürk's tomb

Rasulzade was commemorated by many memorials throughout Azerbaijan, such as Baku State University, which was named after his honor. Rasulzade was depicted on the obverse of the Azerbaijani 1000 manat banknote of 1993–2006.

The Mehmet Emin Resulzade Anatolian High School was named after him and is a public high school at Ankara, Turkey.

== Major works ==
Rasulzade's works include:

- The critic of the party of Etedaliyun (Persian: تنقید فرقه اعتدالیون، و یا، اجتماعیون - اعتدالیون, romanized: Tanqid-e firqa-ye-Etedālīyūn va ya, Ejtemāīyūn-e etedālīyūn). Teheran, 1910 (in Persian);
- The happiness of the mankind (Persian: سعادت بشر, romanized: Saadet-e basher). Ardebil, 1911 (in Persian);
- Two views on the form of government (together with Ahmet Salikov). Baku, 1917 (in Azerbaijani);
- Democracy. Baku, 1917 (in Azerbaijani);
- Which government is good for us? Baku, 1917 (in Azerbaijani);
- Role of Musavat in the formation of Azerbaijan. Baku, 1920 (in Azerbaijani);
- Azerbaijan Republic: characteristics, formation and contemporary state. Istanbul, 1923 (in Ottoman Turkish);
- Siyavush of our century. Istanbul, 1923 and second edition in 1925 (in Ottoman Turkish);
- Ideal of liberty and youth. Istanbul, 1925 (in Ottoman Turkish);
- Political Situation in Russia. Istanbul, 1925 (in Ottoman Turkish);
- The collapse of revolutionary socialism and the future of democracy. Istanbul, 1928 (in Ottoman Turkish);
- Nationality and Bolshevism. Istanbul, 1928 (in Ottoman Turkish);
- Panturanism in regard with the Caucasian problem. Paris, 1930 (in Russian; reprinted with an English introduction in 1985 in Oxford);
- Azerbaijan's struggle for independence. Paris, 1930 (in French);
- Shefibeycilik. Istanbul, 1934 (in Turkish);
- Contemporary Azerbaijani literature. Berlin, 1936 (in Turkish);
- Contemporary Azerbaijani literature. Berlin, 1936 (in Russian);
- The problem of Azerbaijan. Berlin, 1938 (in German);
- Azerbaijan's struggle for independence. Warsaw, 1938 (in Polish)
- Azerbaijan's cultural traditions. Ankara, 1949 (in Turkish);
- Contemporary Azerbaijani literature. Ankara, 1950 (in Turkish);
- Contemporary Azerbaijani history. Ankara, 1951 (in Turkish);
- Great Azerbaijani poet Nizami. Ankara, 1951 (in Turkish);
- National Awareness. Ankara. 1978 (in Turkish);
- Siyavush of our century. Ankara, 1989 (in Turkish);
- Iranian Turks. Istanbul, 1993 (in Turkish);
- Caucasian Turks. Istanbul, 1993 (in Turkish).
