= Brother Man =

1954 novel by Roger Mais

- First edition
- Author: Roger Mais
- Language: English
- Publisher: Jonathan Cape
- Publication date: 1954
- Publication place: Jamaica
- Media type: Print (Paperback)
- Pages: 191 pp

Brother Man (1954) is a novel by Jamaican author and journalist Roger Mais, about a Christ-like wise-man and folk Rastafarian healer, 'Bra' Man' (in dialect) John Power. The book is significant as the first serious representation of the Rastafari movement in literature. Mais foresaw the defining power of the Rasta movement to Jamaican society 20 years before the era of Bob Marley and Reggae mainstream.

It is also significant as an exploration of life in the ghetto of Kingston. It shows how the people relate to leaders, seeing them as God-like or magic depending on their own views, but not hesitating to be overcome by mass bias and discrimination if they believe a leader has failed in any way. The novel is written in prose with a layout that is seemingly cinematic and episodic; little is done to describe the environment beyond the claustrophobic ghetto of 'The Lane' in the slums of Kingston, Jamaica.

== Plot summary ==
The plot follows the superstructure of Christ's story, with other characters resembling Mary Magdalene and other figures from his life. It uses this to explore conditions in the black ghetto of Kingston and the growth of the Rastafari movement.
