= Fortress conservation =

Conservation model

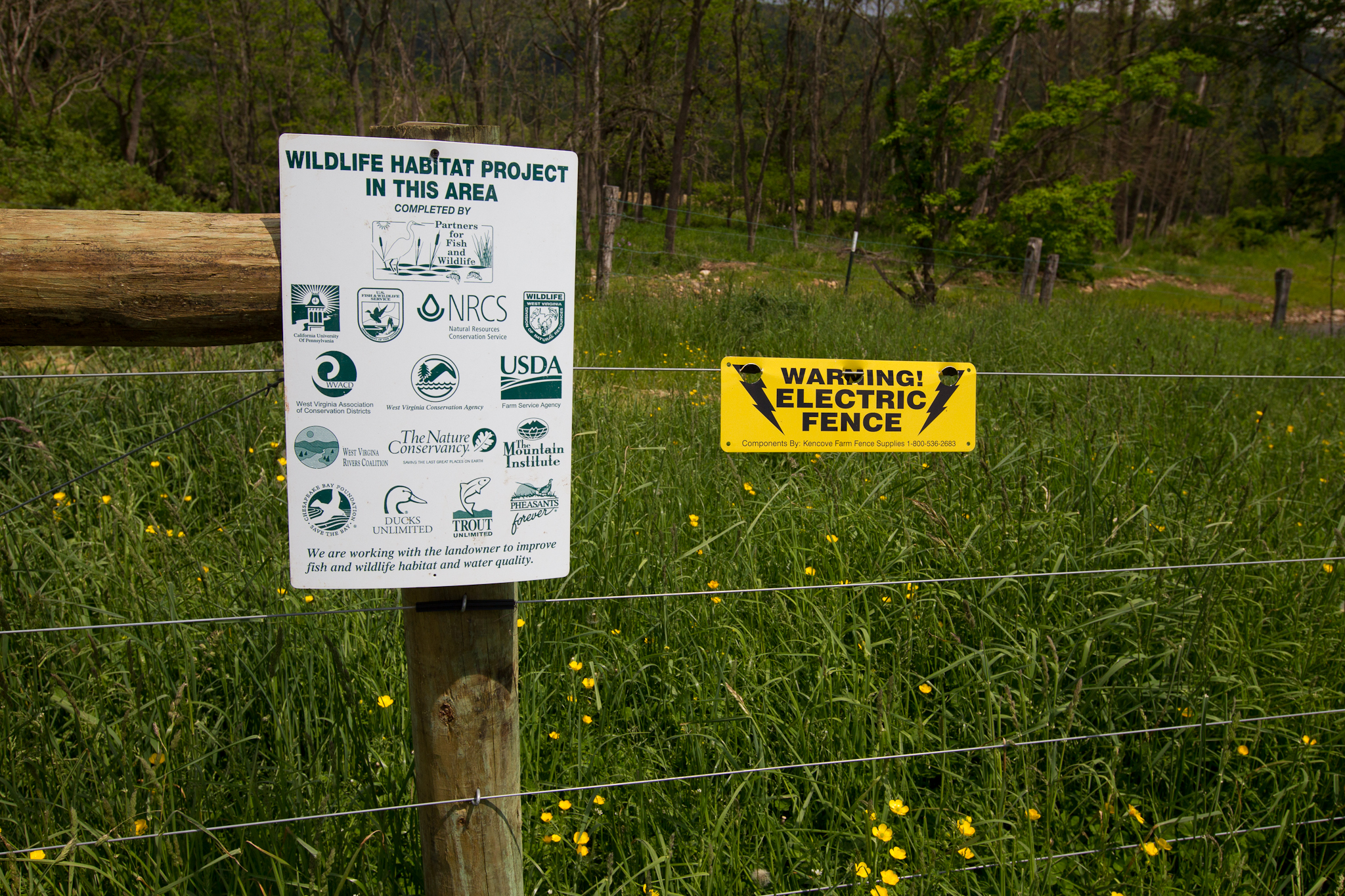
An electric fence surrounding a conservation area in West Virginia

Fortress conservation is a conservation model based on the belief that protection of biodiversity and historical sites is best achieved by creating protected areas in isolation from human disturbance.

== Economic aspects ==
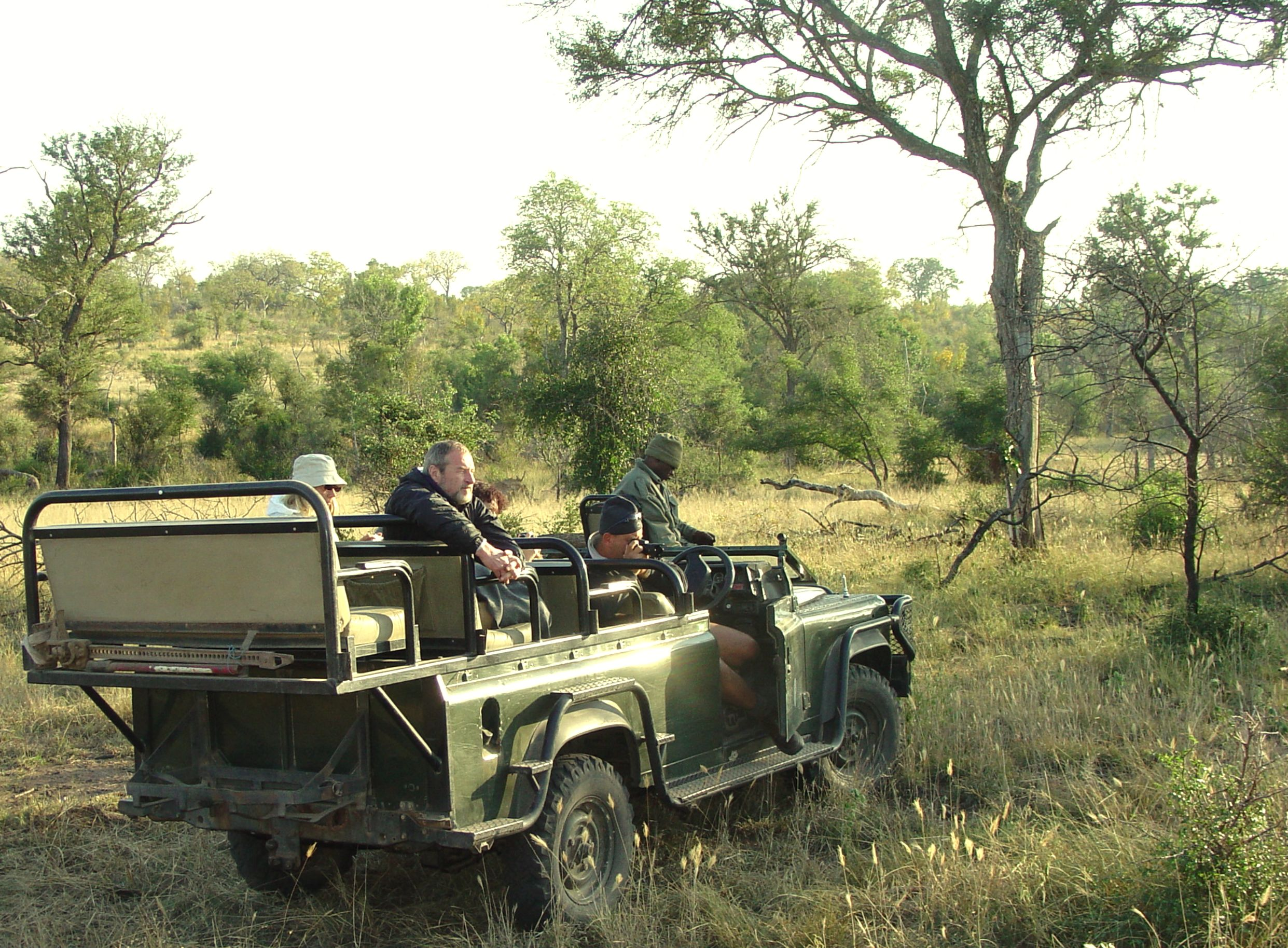
Ecotourism money is argued to drive the eviction of indigenous people.

Poaching is a billion dollar industry that is sometimes organized by criminal gangs that prey on endangered species and, in 2018, 50 park rangers were killed globally. In response, conservation charities, the biggest of which is the World Wildlife Fund, have increasingly militarized the campaign against poaching. African Parks has been at the forefront of militarization with training from South African, French and Israeli military personnel. Veterans from the wars in Afghanistan and Iraq have been recruited to teach forest rangers counterinsurgency techniques and ex–special forces operatives promote their services at wildlife conferences. This has often involved recruiting paramilitary groups who are then supplied with military grade weaponry.

=== Ecotourism ===
Money generated from ecotourism has been a motivating factor driving indigenous inhabitants off the land. The organization African Parks, whose President is Prince Harry, has as its motto "a business approach to conservation" and had at its outset that tourism is its key in making their parks financially sustainable.

=== Carbon credits ===
Forests can be preserved for carbon offsets and credits that can be sold to companies to offset the carbon dioxide they produce. While there are national programs for this, it can be part of a voluntary market as well such as on the international market. Indigenous groups who live in such forests, such as in Peru, have alleged that it leads to abuses against them. Notably, the company Blue Carbon of the UAE has bought ownership over an area equivalent to the United Kingdom to be preserved in return for carbon credits.

== Legal aspects ==
Indigenous groups, such as the Okiek people, are often challenged as many do not have formal title deeds or land rights, despite having inhabited the forests for centuries. The justice system can also be used against the indigenous where, for example, people have been arrested for remaining on their land after it was granted to extractive companies by the government.

The Convention on Biological Diversity has promoted the Kunming-Montreal Global Biodiversity Framework, an outcome of the 2022 United Nations Biodiversity Conference, arguing for the 30 by 30 initiative to designate 30% of Earth's land and ocean area as protected areas by 2030.

== Debate ==
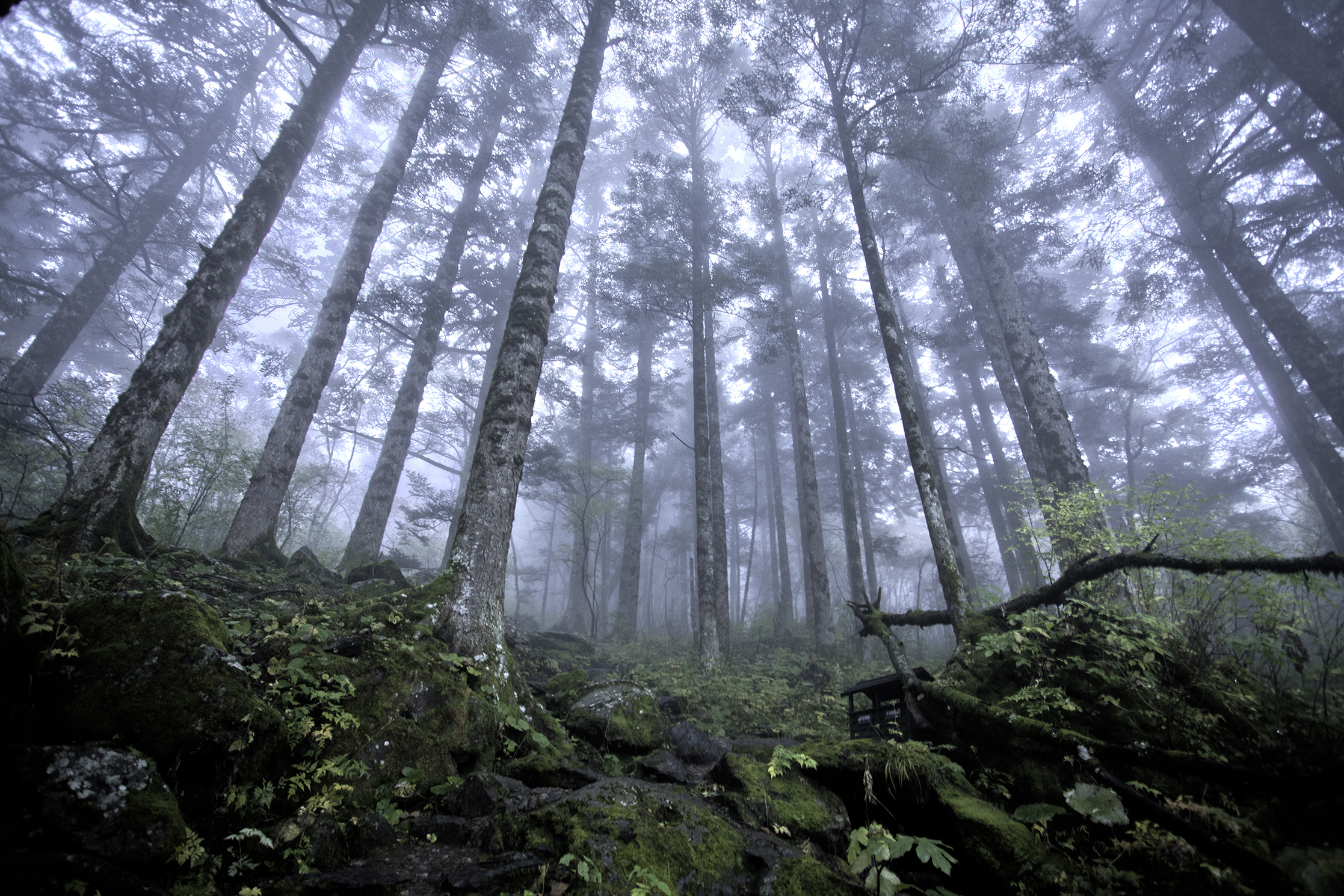
Transferring land rights to indigenous inhabitants is argued to efficiently conserve forests.

The practice of evicting inhabitants to protect nature was referred to as the Yosemite model. Famed paleontogist and conservationist Richard Leakey argued that there is no such thing as indigenous people and argued for the removal of what he referred to as “settlers” from protected areas. Steven Sanderson, who was president of the Wildlife Conservation Society, argued that the entire global conservation agenda had been “hijacked” by advocates for indigenous peoples, placing wildlife and biodiversity at peril.

Others, such as indigenous rights activists, have argued that the most efficient conservation methods involve transferring rights over land from public domain to its indigenous inhabitants, who have had a stake for millennia in preserving the forests that they depend on. This includes the protection of such rights entitled in existing laws, such as the Forest Rights Act in India, where concessions to land continue to go mostly to powerful companies. The transferring of such rights in China, perhaps the largest land reform in modern times, has been argued to have increased forest cover. Granting title of the land has shown to have less clearing than state run parks, notably in the Brazilian Amazon. Even while the largest cause of deforestation in the world's second largest rainforest in the Congo is smallholder agriculture and charcoal production, areas with community concessions have significantly less deforestation as communities are incentivized to manage the land sustainably, even reducing poverty. Additionally, evicting inhabitants from protected areas often under the fortress conservation model often leads to more exploitation of the land as the native inhabitants then turn to work for extractive companies to survive.

In September 2026, a group of Indigenous from across Asia, Africa and the Americas issued the Nairobi Declaration condemning fortress conservation and stating, "for decades, our lands have been grabbed and stolen by conservation cartels under the guise of saving Mother Earth". The declaration named specific conservation organisations including, WWF, African Parks, Conservation International International Union for Conservation of Nature, the Frankfurt Zoological Society, International Big Cat Alliance, Zoological Society of London, Wildlife Alliance, Wildlife Conservation Society, and the Nature Conservancy, telling them "leave our lands and respect our rights, else we shall kick you out in exercise of our own system of justice".

== Controversies ==
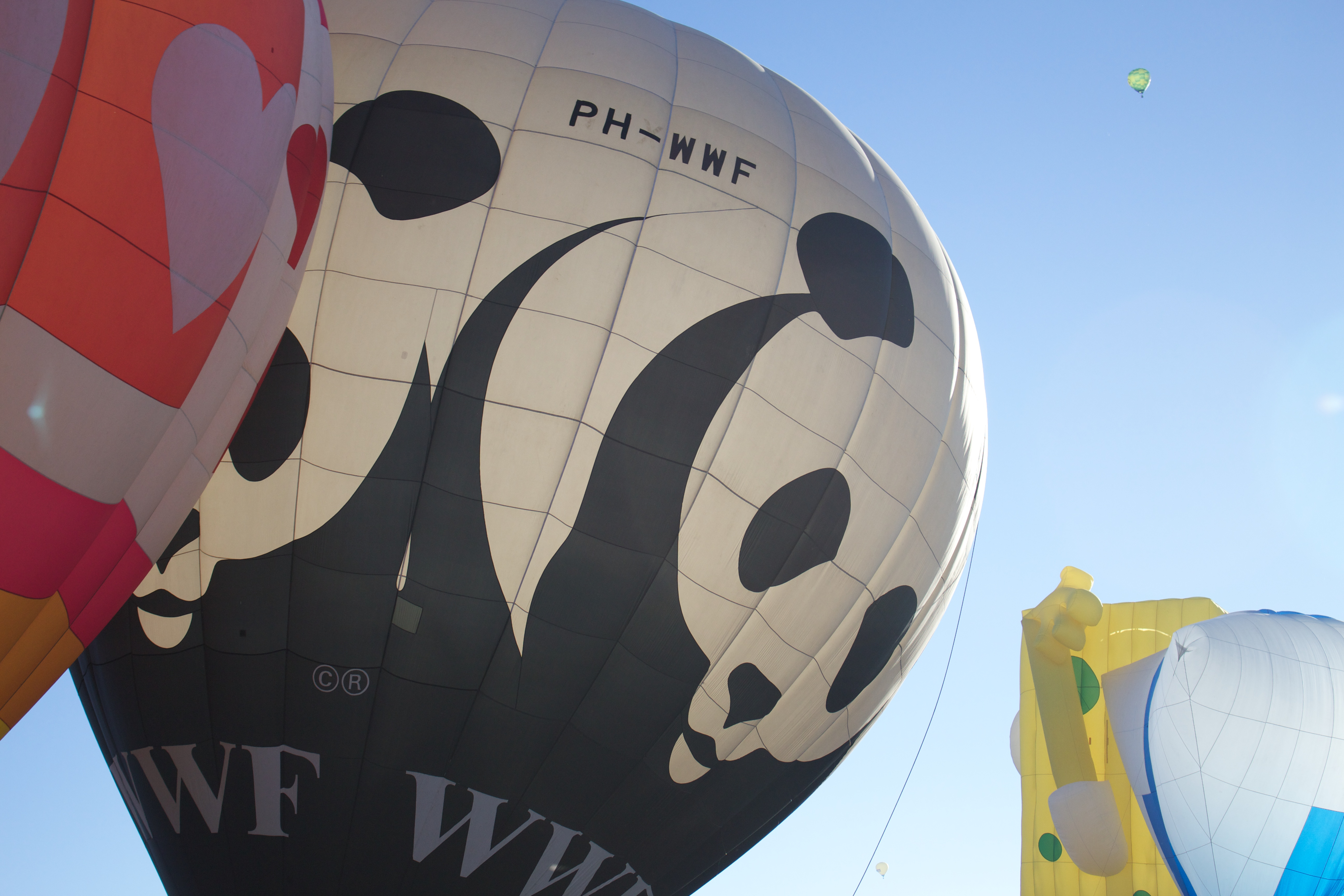
The World Wildlife Fund has been accused of funding park ranger conflicts that push indigenous people off their land in national parks.

Up to 250,000 people worldwide have been forcibly evicted from their homes to make way for conservation projects since 1990, according to the UN special rapporteur on the rights of indigenous peoples. Another estimate put the total number of people displaced between 10.8 million and 173 million. They are sometimes referred to as conservation refugees.

=== Botswana ===
In Botswana, many of the indigenous San people have been forcibly relocated from their land to reservations. To make them relocate, they were denied access to water on their land and faced arrest if they hunted, which was their primary source of food. The government claims the relocation is to preserve the wildlife and ecosystem, even though the San people have lived sustainably on the land for millennia. Additionally, their lands lie in the middle of the world's richest diamond field. On the reservations they struggle to find employment, and alcoholism is rampant.

=== Cambodia ===
About 10,000 families have been forcibly removed from the Angkor Wat temple site. The site is a UNESCO world heritage site and UNESCO has faced criticism for its alleged role in the evictions.

=== Cameroon ===
Baka people in Cameroon's Lobéké National Park have alleged abuse by park rangers funded by the World Wildlife Fund (WWF).

=== Democratic Republic of the Congo ===
In national parks in the Democratic Republic of the Congo, such as Kahuzi-Biéga National Park, heavily armed park rangers come into deadly conflict with the pygmy inhabitants who often cut the trees down to sell charcoal. The conservation efforts of national parks in the country are often financed by international organizations such as the WWF and often involve removing native inhabitants off the land.

=== Ethiopia ===
African Parks took over Nechisar National Park in Ethiopia in 2004 and around a thousand Koore families were resettled but when the local Gujii resisted eviction, police and park authorities torched 463 Guji homes. In the Omo Valley live the Mursi people, Surma people, Nyangatom people, Dizi people Kwegu people and Mekan people . The Omo National Park in the area was established in 1966 and the Ethiopian Wildlife Conservation Department in 1978 recommended removing the Mursi claiming they diminish the park's value. In 2005, a few randomly selected, illiterate Mursi placed their thumbprints on a document that government officials later said had meant that they had given “prior consent” to be moved out of the park. African Parks took over the Omo National Park in 2005 but left in 2007.

=== India ===
The Indian government’s National Tiger Conservation Authority state that 56,247 families, more than 100,000 people have been evicted since 1972 for tiger conservation across 50 tiger reserves.

In Kaziranga National Park, known to conserve two thirds of the world's Indian rhinoceroses, rangers have been given powers to shoot and kill normally only conferred on armed forces policing civil unrest. In 2015, more people were shot dead by park guards than rhinos were killed by poachers. WWF provided specialist equipment like night vision goggles and combat and ambush training for Kaziranga's guards.

=== Israel/Palestine ===
Israel has been accused of using initiatives of protecting nature and historical sites to displace Palestinians, such as the City of David National Park.

=== Kenya ===
Okiek communities, who lived mostly around the Mau Forest and have been subject to evictions by successive governments, are contesting land taken by the Mount Elgon National Park. In 2022, the African Court on Human and Peoples' Rights ruled that the Kenyan government must compensate the Okiek for decades of material and moral damages, recognize their indigeneity and help get them official titles to their ancestral lands. Those of the Sengwer people living in the Embobut Forest have been attacked by the Kenya Forest Service under the pretense of conservation during a European Union funded conservation project.

=== Mongolia ===
The Tengis Shishged national reserve was established with a ban on hunting and is enforced by park rangers. Members of the Dukha, who relied on hunting in that area for centuries, are given a salary as compensation and some have been arrested for hunting.

=== Nepal ===
The creation of Chitwan National Park in the 1970s led to tens of thousands of indigenous Tharu people to be evicted. The World Wildlife Fund has been accused of providing high-tech enforcement equipment, cash, and weapons to rangers involved torturing Tharu living near national parks such as Bardiya National Park. Nepalese law was changed to give forest rangers the power to investigate wildlife-related crimes, make arrests without a warrant, and retain immunity in cases where an officer had "no alternative" but to shoot the offender while the park's chief warden has the power to hand out 15-year prison terms by themselves.

=== Peru ===
The Kichwa of Peru claim they are affected by the Cordillera Azul National Park and the Cordillera Escalera Regional Conservation Area. They claim the ban on hunting has caused hunger and carbon credits for preserving the forest do not come to them. Those of mostly the rondero community have been evicted for the Alto Mayo Protection Forest, which is preserved for carbon offsets for companies such as the Walt Disney Company.

=== Republic of the Congo ===
Forest rangers, known as ecoguards, dressed in paramilitary uniforms and heavily armed with funding from the WWF, are accused of torture, rape and murder of Baka pygmies in the proposed Messok Dja protected area as part of an effort to remove the Baka pygmies from the area. African Parks admitted that human rights abuses were committed by its rangers in Odzala-Kokoua National Park. African Parks have refused to publish the independent report into these abuses.

=== Tanzania ===
More than 150,000 Maasai people face eviction in Tanzania with moves to turn their lands into nature reserves for luxury safari tourism and for trophy hunting in the Ngorongoro Conservation Area, which is a UNESCO World Heritage Site, and in Loliondo near the Serengeti National Park. Previous attempts to forcefully evict the Maasai were alleged to have included burning their homes.

=== Uganda ===
In 1991, Uganda classified the land that the indigenous Batwa lived on as national parks and they claim that many have been evicted from their homes. In particular, these areas, such as the Mgahinga Gorilla National Park, are also home to the endangered Mountain gorilla.

=== United States of America ===
The United States was the pioneer of fortress conservation. After the National Park Act of 1872 was passed, President Theodore Roosevelt deployed US Army cavalry troops to protect the newly established National Parks, often leading to forced expulsion of indigenous Americans. This went on until 1916 when the National Park Service was established. The preservation of Yosemite National Park under the advocacy of John Muir meant the expulsion of the Miwok and Paiute Native Americans.

== See also ==
- Green grabbing
- World Wide Fund for Nature § Alleged human rights abuses by paramilitaries
