= Blue Carbon (company) =

Emirati company

Blue Carbon is an Emirati company that was launched in October 2022. The company seeks to conserve forests that might otherwise be logged, thus preventing carbon dioxide from entering the atmosphere in order to earn carbon credits to sell to companies and governments who would want to release carbon dioxide. It is assumed that much of the credits would be sold to the oil producing United Arab Emirates.

Sheikh Ahmed Dalmook Al Maktoum is the founder and chairman of Blue Carbon. He was previously involved in deals to sell Russia’s Sputnik V vaccine at a premium during the COVID 19 pandemic. The current CEO is Josiane Sadaka, a British-educated brand manager for other companies owned by Sheikh Ahmed as well. Samuele Landi, an Italian businessman convicted of fraudulent bankruptcy who lived as a fugitive until his death at sea in 2024, was listed as an advisor to Blue Carbon. The company initially stated it would focus on carbon storage on marine ecosystems, known as Blue carbon.

In September 2023, Zimbabwe signed control over almost 20% of the country's land to Blue Carbon. Blue Carbon's parent company agreed to transfer $1.5 billion to Zimbabwe, which is more than the country spends on education and childcare. Additionally, Blue Carbon has done deals covering 10% of Liberia, 10% of Zambia, 8% of Tanzania (which also signed a deal handing 5.9 million acres to a similar company GreenCop Development), the Bahamas, Nigeria, Papua New Guinea, Saint Lucia, Dominica, Comoros, Pakistan and Kenya. In total, Blue Carbon has secured forested area equivalent to the land area of the entire United Kingdom.

== See also ==
- Carbon credits
