= All Power Labs =

- Type: Private
- Industry: renewable energy
- Founded: 2007 in Berkeley, California
- Products: Biomass Gasifiers, Electrical Generators
- Website: www.allpowerlabs.com

All Power Labs (APL) is a renewable energy company based in Berkeley, California, USA. The firm designs and manufactures biomass gasifiers and builds and markets small-scale (15–150 kW) electrical generators fueled by these gasifiers. By 2013, they reached an installed base of 500 machines in approximately 40 countries; As of 2015, APL employed 30 staff, including engineering, manufacturing, management, sales, and technical support staff, on the site of the former Shipyard, an approximately 20,000 sq.ft. facility that includes APL’s offices, R&D, manufacturing and production facilities.

== History ==
Jim Mason and Jessica Hobbs founded APL in 2007 on the site of, and based on, the work of the former Shipyard. The Shipyard was a collaborative art-development space established in 2001 by Mason in a dozen shipping-container workspaces assembled around a small machine shop in West Berkeley. Containers were rented out to artists, engineers and scientists he selected mostly from among his collaborators on art projects for the Burning Man festival. Unable to get approval for a grid-power connection due to building code issues, the Shipyard community assembled an off-grid power system combining 2 kW of used photovoltaic panels, a 4000 amp hour surplus telecommunication battery bank, a pair of used diesel generators running on biodiesel made in an on-site biodiesel-reactor facility, and began experimenting with biomass gasification as a potential power source.

APL's initial goal was education and experimentation in open-source alternative energy technologies, to create a do-it-yourself (DIY) power-hacking culture. The first year, they limited their focus to open-source development of biomass gasification technology, and produced a range of open-source DIY Gasifier Experimenters Kits (GEK), whose plans and CAD files were made available online. By 2013 they had abandoned the open-source model and limited production to proprietary, patent-protected energy products, by 2015 they had establishing a board of directors including renewable energy academic and biomass-power business advocates.

== Water Abundance XPRIZE ==
In September 2018, APL provided the electrical power at the APL facility in Berkeley for the Skysource/Skywater Alliance's device that won the $1.5 million Water XPRIZE, which required the production of at least 2,000 liters of water in a 24-hour period at a cost of less than 2 cents per liter powered by renewable energy. The system employed an APL produced PP30 Biomass Gasifier Genset powering three Skysource designed Skywater 300 atmospheric water generators which extracted water from the atmosphere and the additional moisture generated by the drying of the woodchips used to fuel the gasifier.

== Products ==
In 2010, APL began to manufacture an integrated biomass gasifier-genset named the Power Pallet in 10 kW and 20 kW ratings. By the end of 2013 the sale of GEK kits and 10 kW version were abandoned along with the company's open-source distribution of its latest plans and designs, to concentrate on a 20 kW unit using a proprietary gasifier based on Mason’s patents. However they continued to curate and make available early designs and technical information about gasification and gasifier engineering. In late 2016, their principal product was a 25 kW Power Pallet biomass genset which included formerly optional combined heat and power (CHP) and Grid-tied Electrical System features as standard equipment. A principal segment of their market is directed at addressing energy poverty in the developing world. In 2015, using a California Energy Commission (CEC) grant intended to incentivize forest-fire remediation, they developed a 150 kW version of a shipping-container-based genset named the Powertainer that was initially built as a 100 kW prototype in 2012 with the assistance of a US Department of Energy grant.

The firm also distributes waste biochar to Bay Area community-based agriculture as part of its spin-off biochar program: the Local Carbon Network (LCN), and continues to support the open-source distribution of a Biochar Experimenter’s Kit (BEK) plans for building and operating a gasification-based biochar retort intended to support research in biochar production and use.

== Operation ==
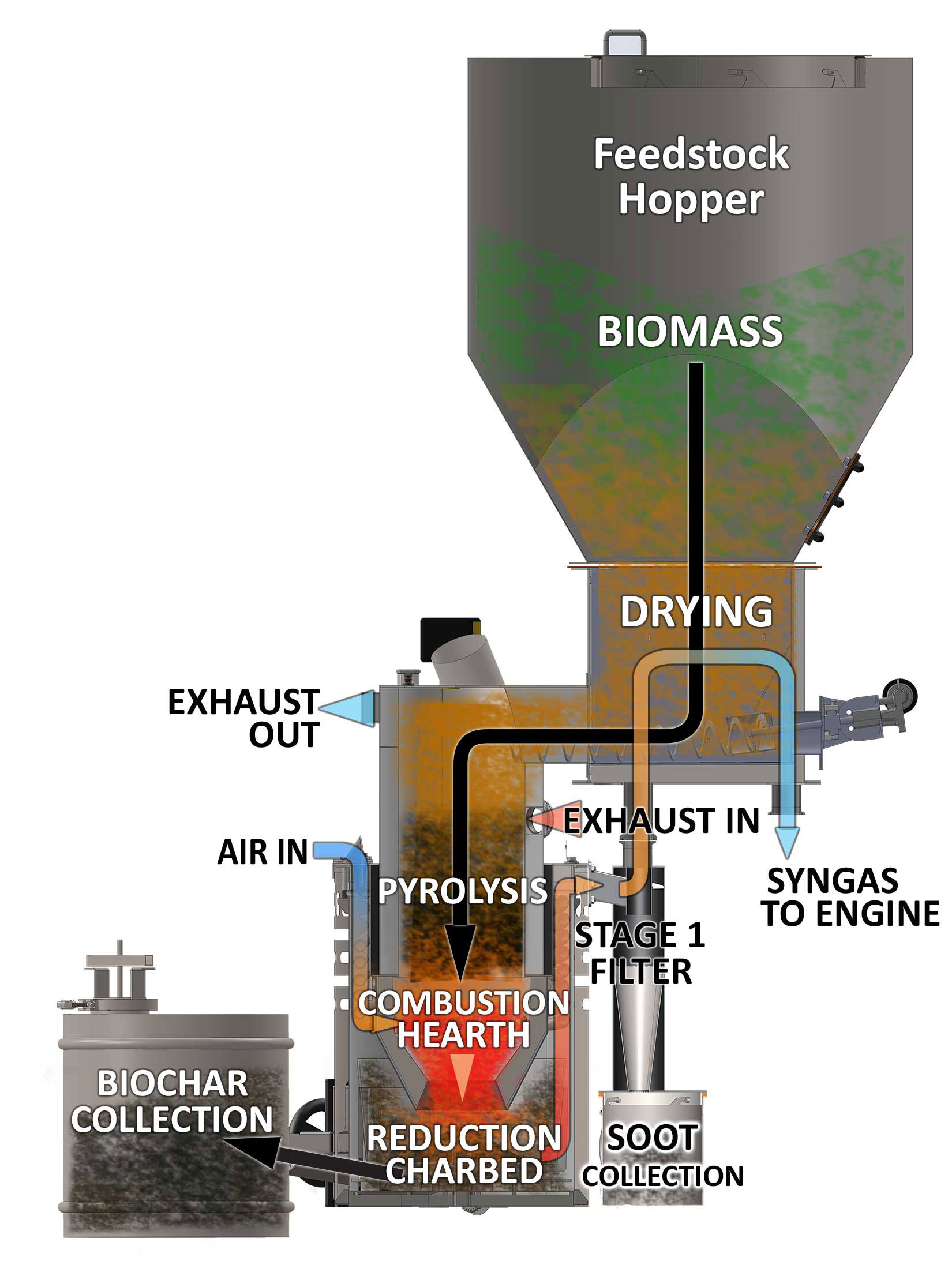
Material and Process Flows in a GEK Gasifier

Biomass gasification uses high temperatures in a low-oxygen environment to convert woody feedstocks into a Syngas fuel composed predominantly of flammable hydrogen (H2) and carbon monoxide (CO) gases. When waste biomass is used as the feedstock and the biochar byproduct is sequestered, such as when used as a soil amendment, the operation results in Negative carbon dioxide emission. APL's gasifiers can use a variety of lignocellulosic biomass (woody biomass) such as wood chips, nut shells, and other agricultural bi-products as feedstock, at the rate of approximately 1 kg/kWh.
