= BICR =

BICR may refer to the following abbreviations:

- Blinded Independent Central Review, a methodology for reviewing Clinical trials
- Biomass carbon removal and storage (often abbreviated as BiCRS) a type of carbon dioxide removal technology
