= Advance market commitment =

Funding mechanism for technologies

An advance market commitment (AMC) is a promise to buy or subsidise a product if it is successfully developed. AMCs are typically offered by governments or private foundations to encourage the development of vaccines or treatments. In exchange, pharmaceutical companies commit to providing doses at a fixed price. This funding mechanism is used when the cost of research and development is too high to be worthwhile for the private sector without a guarantee of a certain quantity of purchases.

The idea of advance market commitments was developed by economists in the 2000s. This idea was applied to finance the pneumococcal conjugate vaccine. During the COVID-19 crisis, the COVAX AMC provided 1.8 billion vaccine doses to 87 low and middle-income countries. AMCs could be used to stimulate research on universal vaccines, which would contribute to pandemic preparedness. An AMC has also been launched for carbon-removal that meets certain technical specifications.

== Description ==
In the case of vaccines, an advance market commitment is a contract between three types of parties: the sponsors, the recipient countries, and the firms. The sponsors promise to largely subsidise vaccines that meet certain eligibility requirements, up to a fixed number of doses. For example, a global fund can guarantee to pay $14 out of $15 for the first 200 million doses of vaccines that have an efficacy of more than 70%. Countries benefiting from the vaccines agree to pay the remaining part of the price ($1 in the example). This small co-payment ensures that there is an actual demand for the vaccines. In return, the firms commit to provide further doses at a small price, close to the cost of production. In the example, the pharmaceutical companies which develop an eligible vaccine would benefit from the high $15 price for the first 200 million doses, but would have to provide all further doses at a low price, like $1 per dose. This stipulation ensures that the product stays affordable for developing countries in the long run.

While using a pull funding mechanism intended to supplement direct support for R&D (classified as push funding), AMC aims to navigate the challenge of selecting promising projects in advance amid conditions of asymmetric information. This approach incentivizes successful vaccine development by offering financial rewards based on outcomes, thereby facilitating investment in research without the necessity to accurately predict project success from the outset.

=== Vaccine market distortions ===
AMC is designed to address immediate and long-term vaccine market distortions, implementing a price cap strategy to limit deadweight loss. By offering an additional amount (top-up price) over the marginal cost of the vaccine, it aims to stimulate more investment in R&D. This enhancement in R&D is crucial in response to a series of identified challenges: the restricted demand from low-income countries due to limited purchasing power, the occurrence of the free-rider problem where individuals benefit from herd immunity without being vaccinated, and the risk of political pressure to reduce vaccine prices, altogether leading to a hold-up problem where manufacturers may be cautious about investing in R&D due to concerns over recovering their costs. AMC strives to address these issues by providing a financial incentive to develop vaccines that might otherwise be overlooked.

== Origins of the idea ==
In 1998, Michael Kremer published an academic article on patent buyouts: he argued that governments could improve access to treatments by buying patents and placing them in the public domain. Inspired by his experiences in Kenya, where he contracted malaria, he then proposed the idea of a "vaccine purchase commitment" to encourage research on neglected diseases. In 2001, a report of the United Kingdom mentioned that a potential global fund to fight HIV/AIDS, malaria, and tuberculosis could also make advance purchase commitments. This idea continued to gain traction in 2004, when Michael Kremer and Rachel Glennerster published a book advocating for it. It gained additional momentum in 2005 with the publication of a report by the Center for Global Development. In 2006, the G8 was considering setting up an "advance market commitment", and this expression was used in an academic paper estimating the cost-effectiveness of the measure.

== Applications ==
=== Pneumococcal disease ===
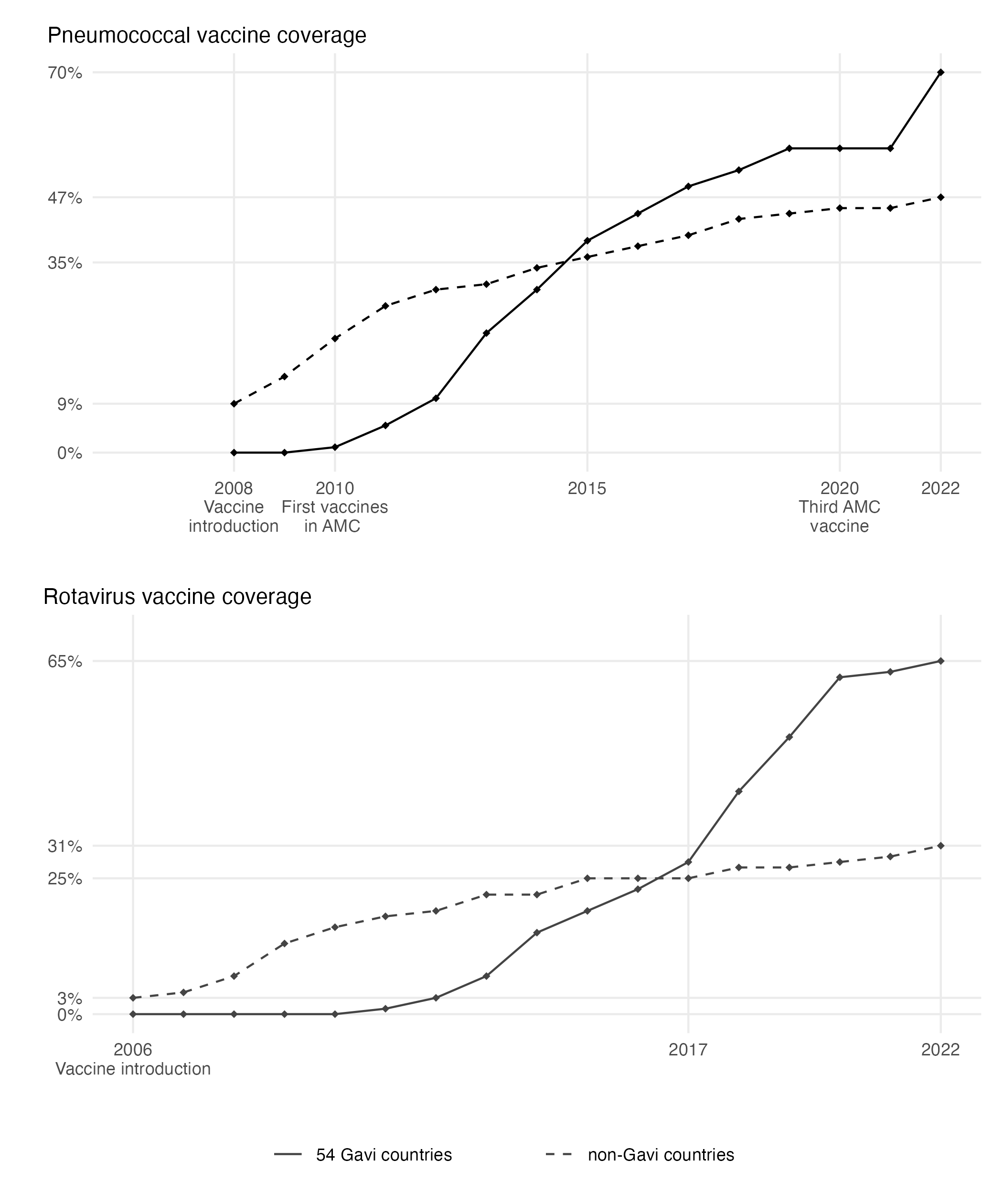
Coverage increased faster for pneumococcal vaccines than for rotavirus vaccines, which did not benefit from an AMC.

The first advance market commitment was launched in 2009 by GAVI, the World bank, WHO, UNICEF, five national governments, and the Gates Foundation. It targeted pneumococcal disease. According to a 2005 WHO estimate, at that time, pneumococcal disease killed 1.6 million people every year, mostly in the Global South. The AMC sponsors provided $1.5 billion to subsidise vaccine doses, at an initial $3.5 per dose. In 2010, GSK and Pfizer each committed to supply 30 million doses each year. In 2020, the Serum Institute of India started producing a third vaccine at $2 per dose. The Gavi Pneumococcal Conjugate Vaccine AMC officially finished in 2020, with contracts with manufacturers lasting until 2029.

In 2021, development consulting firm Dalberg published a report evaluating the impact of the AMC. The report did not find evidence that the AMC sped up the creation of new vaccines. However, the AMC led manufacturers to develop multi-dose vials, which helped drive down cost per dose. Despite initial production delays, the number of doses distributed each year grew from 3 million in 2010 to 150 million in 2015. Recipient countries introduced pneumococcal conjugate vaccines faster than HPV, rotavirus and Hib vaccines, which did not benefit from an AMC. Overall, the Dalberg report found that the AMC was probably successful at increasing vaccination coverage, which led to saving more lives. However, quantifying the effectiveness of the program is difficult because of the lack of a valid counterfactual.

The AMC was relatively ineffective at driving vaccine prices down. Before the arrival of the vaccine of the Serum Institute of India, Médecins sans frontières criticised the AMC for providing excessive subsidies to GSK and Pfizer.

=== COVID-19 ===
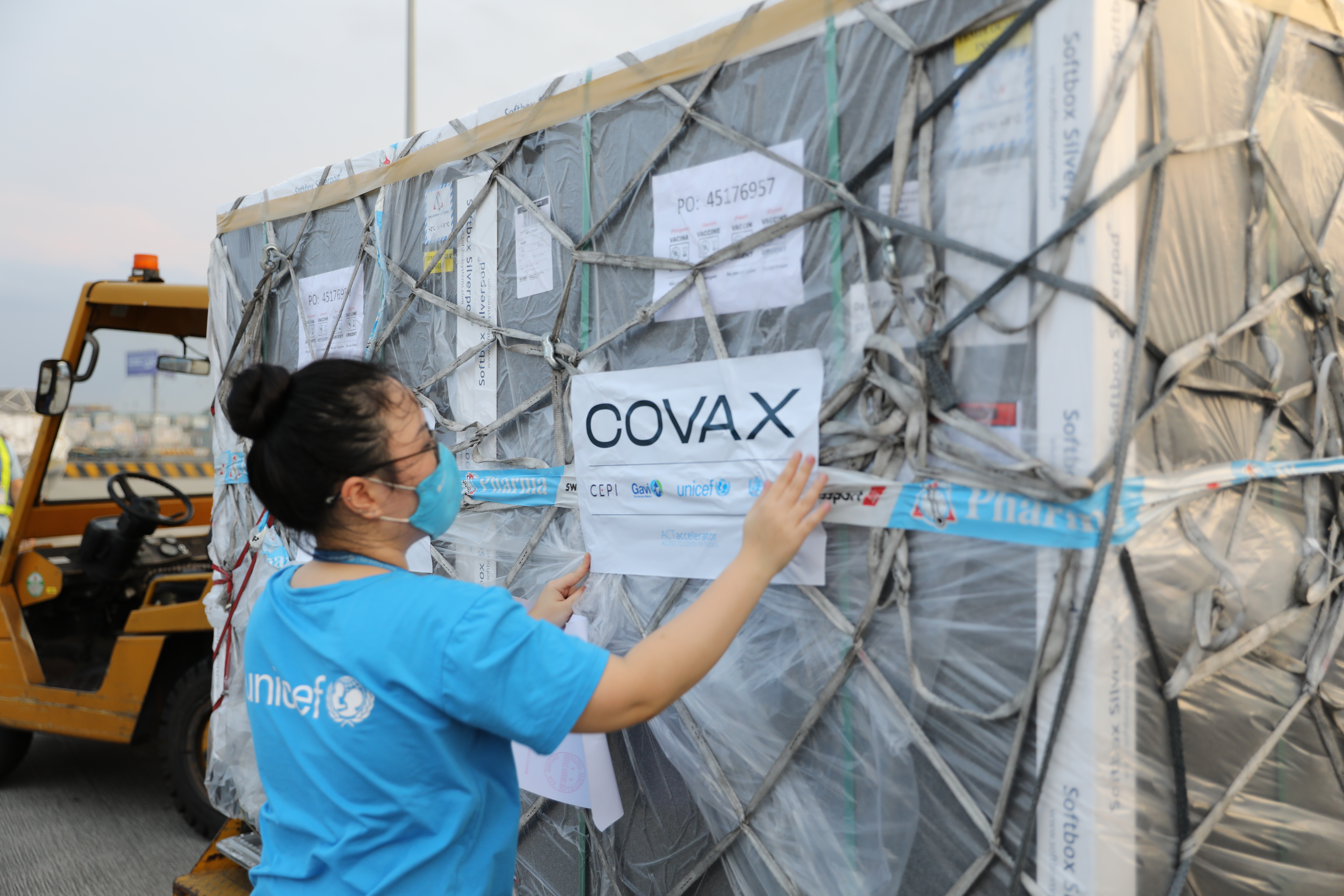
A shipment of vaccines delivered to Vietnam as part of the COVAX AMC

=== Carbon removal ===
In December 2021, an AMC for carbon-removal was first proposed in a Politico essay by economists Susan Athey, Rachel Glennerster, Christopher Snyder and Nan Ransohoff, the head of Stripe Climate.

In April 2022, Stripe launched Frontier Climate, an AMC, "to buy an initial $925M of permanent carbon removal between 2022 and 2030." Ransohoff, who leads the project, told The Atlantic that the carbon-removal market will probably need to reach $1 trillion per year.

== Comparison to other incentives ==
Advance market agreements are a form of “pull incentive”, which refers to a class of innovation incentives where payments are conditioned on outputs or outcomes. Examples of pull mechanisms include advance market commitments, prizes, and patents. They contrast with “push incentives”, such as grants, where payments are made upfront based on R&D inputs.

== Advance purchase agreements ==
Advance purchase agreements (APAs), like AMCs, are a tool to incentivize capacity and R&D by reducing demand uncertainty. APAs involve a sponsor pre-committing to buy a certain volume of a product at a pre-specified price. However, unlike AMCs, APAs are generally signed with specific manufacturers rather than being available to the entire market. The two concepts are often conflated, as some argue that the COVAX AMC is actually just a series of APAs.

== Prizes ==
Innovation prizes are another form of R&D pull incentive, whereupon payment is conditioned on some technical achievement. Examples of innovation prizes include the Longitude rewards, the Global Cooling Prize and the Ansari X Prize. While both prizes and AMCs condition payment on outcomes, AMC payments are linked to scale (as payments are linked to sales in the market) while prizes are not. Michael Kremer and Heidi Williams argue that the presence of this "market test" makes AMCs more valuable than prizes at generating innovations usable at scale.
