= Biomass carbon removal and storage =

Family of technologies for Carbon dioxide removal

Biomass carbon removal and storage (frequently abbreviated as BiCRS) is a family of technologies for carbon dioxide removal, which collect biomass (such as agricultural waste or biproducts of biomass energy systems) and sequesters that carbon through a permanent or semi-permanent method of storage. The family of technologies is often compared with direct air capture. Unlike direct air capture that use human engineered technologies to remove carbon dioxide from the atmosphere (which is expensive and energy intensive), BiCRS technologies rely on photosynthesis of plants and then engineering solutions for taking the carbon-rich residue of that plant life and sequestering it.

BiCRS technologies introduce a number of challenges for carbon dioxide removal, including uncertainty about measuring sequestration of buried biomass, and complexity in sourcing biomass (it introduces additional demand for agricultural land and organic bioproducts). Researchers and policy think tanks like World Resources Institute recommend policy that put limits on which kind of biomass can be used for these process.

The family of technologies is a major part of the Frontier Climate advanced commitment purchase portfolio, including companies like Charm Industrial and Vaulted Deep.

== Technologies ==
=== BECCS ===
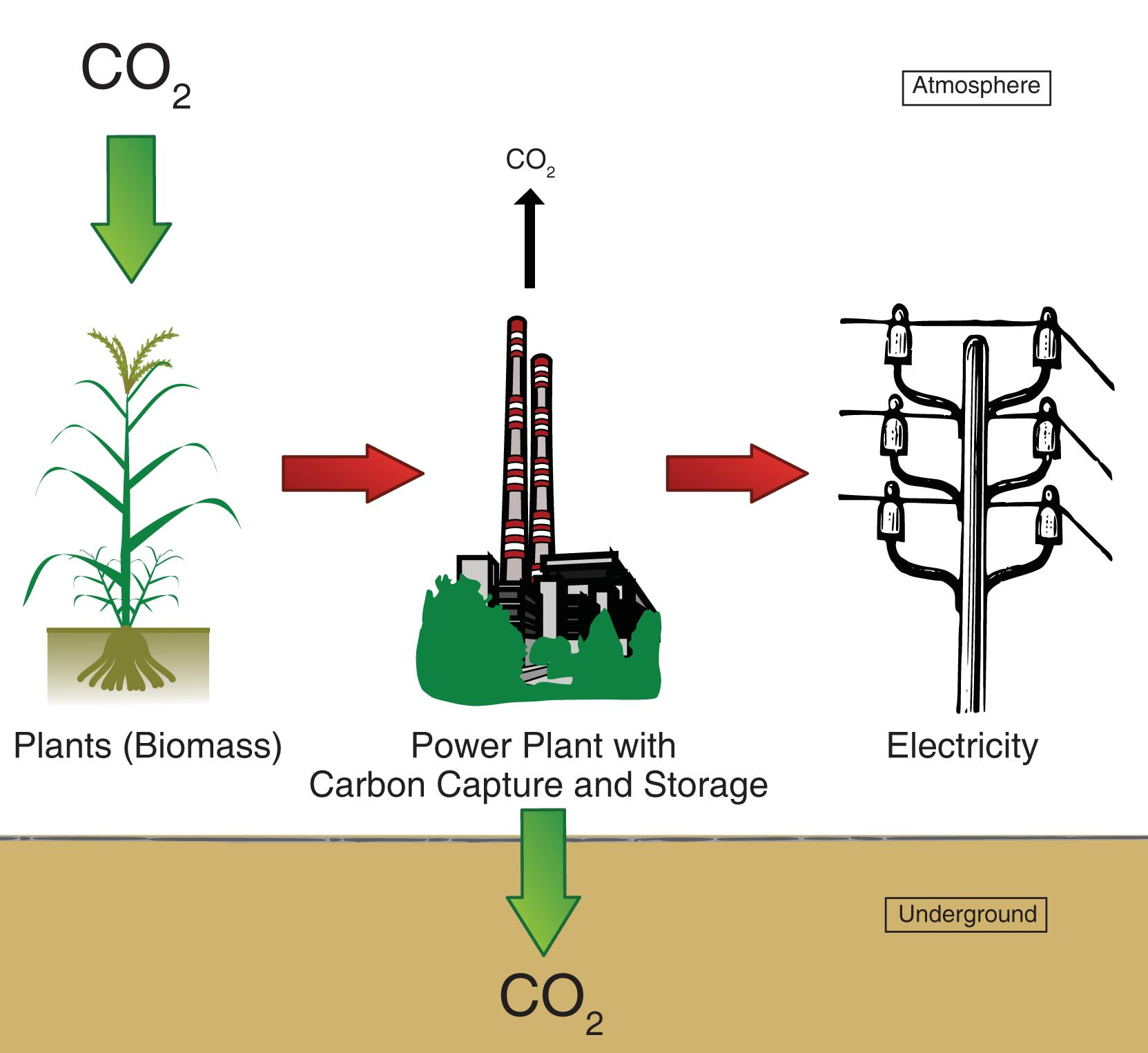
Example of BECCS: Diagram of bioenergy power plant with carbon capture and storage.

Bioenergy with carbon capture and storage (BECCS) is the process of extracting bioenergy from biomass and capturing and storing the carbon dioxide (CO_{2}) that is produced.

Greenhouse gas emissions from bioenergy can be low because when vegetation is harvested for bioenergy, new vegetation can grow that will absorb CO_{2} from the air through photosynthesis. After the biomass is harvested, energy ("bioenergy") is extracted in useful forms (electricity, heat, biofuels, etc.) as the biomass is utilized through combustion, fermentation, pyrolysis or other conversion methods. Using bioenergy releases CO_{2}. In BECCS, some of the CO_{2} is captured before it enters the atmosphere, and stored underground using carbon capture and storage technology. Under some conditions, BECCS can remove carbon dioxide from the atmosphere.

The potential range of negative emissions from BECCS was estimated to be zero to 22 giga tonnes per year. As of 2024, there are large-scale 3 BECCS projects operating in the world. Wide deployment of BECCS is constrained by cost and availability of biomass. Since biomass production is land-intensive, deployment of BECCS can pose major risks to food production, human rights, and biodiversity.

=== Biochar carbon removal ===
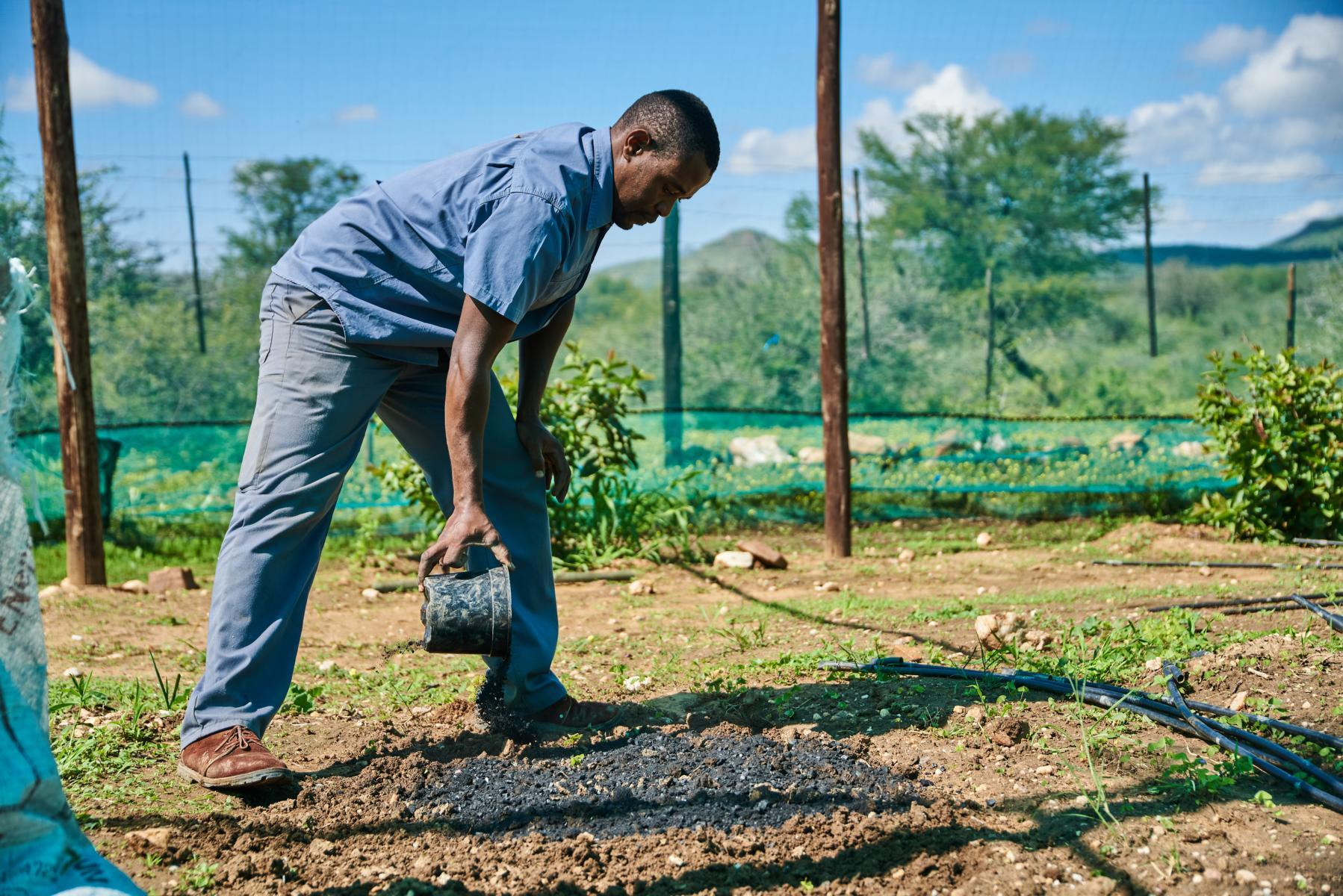
Biochar applied to the soil in research trials in Namibia

Biochar carbon removal (also called pyrogenic carbon capture and storage) is a negative emissions technology. It involves the production of biochar through pyrolysis of residual biomass and the subsequent application of the biochar in soils or durable materials (e.g. cement, tar). Biochar locks carbon from biomass into a stable, charcoal-like form that can persist in soils for centuries to millennia, instead of returning to the atmosphere as CO_{2}.

Multi-pool modelling of biochar soil amendments indicates a centennial – millennial turnover rate, depending on factors like feedstocks used, production conditions, application rates and the characteristics of depositional sites. Additionally, biochar and related residues (i.e. pyrogenic carbon) have been demonstrated to have the potential for wider carbon cycling effects such as suppressing greenhouse gas (GHG) fluxes from amended soils and benefitting vegetation growth.

In some cases amendment studies and meta-analyses have pointed to undesired effects of biochar soil amendments, such as sub-centennial biochar turnover, increased GHG fluxes and degradation of non-biochar soil carbon stocks. Biochar carbon removal can thus be deployed as a targeted strategy, for example with appropriate application rates, feedstocks and production conditions for the intended application site.
