= Christopher Snyder =

Christopher Snyder may refer to:

- Christopher Snyder (historian), American historian
- Christopher Snyder (economist), American economist
- Chris Snyder, American baseball catcher
