= Bali Pulendran =

American and Australian immunologist

- Education: BA (Hon), Cambridge University, Natural Sciences; PhD, The Walter & Eliza Hall Institute, University of Melbourne, Australia, Immunology
- Scientific career
- Fields: Vaccines, immunology
- Workplaces: Stanford University, Emory University, Emory Vaccine Center, [Baylor Institute for Immunology Research, Immunex Corporation
- Doctoral advisor: Sir Gustav Nossal
- Website: https://med.stanford.edu/pulendranlab

Bali Pulendran is an American and Australian immunologist. He is the Violetta L. Horton Professor at the Stanford University School of Medicine, and Director of the Institute for Immunity, Transplantation, and Infection at Stanford University. He is a professor in the Department of Pathology, Department of Microbiology and Immunology, and Fellow at ChEM-H (Chemistry, Engineering and Medicine for Human Health) at Stanford University School of Medicine, Stanford University.

== Education ==
Pulendran received his undergraduate degree from Cambridge University, and his PhD from the Walter & Eliza Hall Institute in Melbourne, Australia, under the supervision of Sir Gustav Nossal. He then did his post-doctoral work at Immunex Corporation in Seattle, Washington.

== Career ==
After serving as a postdoctoral scholar at Immunex Corporation, Pulendran held assistant an associate professorships at the Baylor Institute for Immunology Research in Dallas, Texas and joined Emory University's faculty as an associate professor in 2002, at the Emory Vaccine Center. Promoted to full professor in 2004, he became director of Emory's innate immunity program in 2008, receiving the Charles Howard Candler chaired professorship that same year. He came to Stanford University as Violetta L. Horton professor in 2017. He was appointed director of Stanford Medicine's Institute for Immunity, Transplantation and Infection in 2024.

== Research ==
Pulendran's research has helped define major paradigms in vaccinology and immunology.

=== Systems biological assessment of human immunity to vaccination and infection ===
Pulendran pioneered the field of systems vaccinology to use systems biological approaches to probe immunity to vaccination and infection in humans. In a study published in 2008, Pulendran and team used systems biological approaches to predict the immune response to the yellow fever vaccine, one of the most successful vaccines ever developed. Using transcriptional profiling and machine learning, they identified early blood signatures that accurately predicted subsequent T-cell and antibody responses. This study provided proof of concept of the application of systems biological approaches to predicting vaccine responses and offered key mechanistic insights into vaccine immunity. Subsequently, he and several other groups have extended this systems vaccinology approach to studying immune responses to other vaccines such as those against COVID-19, influenza, shingles. During the COVID pandemic, his group was amongst the first to apply systems biological approaches to analyzing the human immune responses to SARS-CoV-2. They have further developed analytical tools such as blood transcriptional modules (BTMs) and multiscale multiresponse networks (MMRNs) to analyze multi-omics data.

This research has revealed fundamental insights into mechanisms of immune regulation, such as the role of the microbiome on vaccine immunity in humans, and the role of cholesterol metabolism in the antibody response to vaccination. In recent studies, Pulendran and colleagues used a systems vaccinology approach to define a universal predictor of antibody responses to vaccination, and discovered a molecular signature that predicts the durability of antibody responses to multiple vaccines in humans, along with the underlying immunological mechanisms.

=== The science and medicine of vaccine adjuvants ===
Pulendran's group has also made major contributions to understanding the mechanism of action of vaccine adjuvants and designing novel adjuvants. They have revealed new mechanisms by which vaccine adjuvants induce durable and broad antibody responses. This work has revealed the capacity of a TLR7/8 ligand (3M-052) to stimulate remarkably durable antibody responses and bone marrow plasma cells, leading to its evaluation in the clinic. Furthermore, their work has revealed new mechanisms by which adjuvants induce broad antiviral defense by epigenetic imprinting of innate immunity in myeloid cells.

=== Synergy between innate and adaptive immunity in protection against pathogens ===
In addition, Pulendran's study in nonhuman primates demonstrating synergy between the cellular, humoral, and innate responses in mediating protection against HIV has invigorated the field to develop vaccines that mobilize the synergistic interactions between the innate and adaptive immune systems[. More recently, he has developed this idea further to introduce the concept of 'integrated organ immunity' to explain how the innate and adaptive immune systems and non-haematopoietic cells can interact in tissues to generate protective immunity against diverse pathogens in an antigen-agnostic manner. Considering immune responses through this framework could enable the design of a new class of vaccines termed 'universal vaccines' that are not pathogen specific.

=== Dendritic cell biology ===
Earlier in his career, Pulendran discovered that dendritic cells (DCs), one of the key cell types orchestrating the immune response, consist of multiple subtypes, which are functionally distinct in their capacity to modulate T-helper 1/T-helper 2 responses in vivo. This was the first evidence for functional specialization of DC subsets in vivo. He also discovered the mechanisms by which microbial stimuli program DCs to modulate T-helper responses, and helped establish Flt3-Ligand as the key growth factor for DCs in vivo in mice and in humans. He further elucidated the molecular mechanisms by which DCs mediate immunological tolerance, and how metabolic sensors such as GCN2 and mTOR regulate DC function and innate immunity.

== Awards and honors ==
- 2025 AAI-Ralph Steinman Award in Human Immunology
- 2024 ViE Award for the Best Research Team at the World Vaccine Congress
- 2024 Fellow of the American Association for the Advancement of Science
- 2023 Invited Speaker, Nobel Symposium in Physiology or Medicine 2023, organized by Nobel Foundation, the Royal Swedish Academy of Sciences, Karolinska Institute
- 2020 Fellow of the European Society of Clinical Microbiology and Infectious Diseases (ESCMID)
- 2017 – present Violetta L. Horton Professorship, Stanford University
- 2014 – present Thomson Reuters (Clarivate) list of Highly Cited Researchers, 2014 (ranked amongst top 1% of researchers most cited for their subject during the past decade)
- 2013 – 2023 Scientific Advisory Board Member, Keystone Symposia
- 2011 – 2021 MERIT AWARD, NIDDK, National Institutes of Health
- 2011 Albert E. Levy Award for Excellence in Scientific Research, Emory University
- 2010 Member of the "Blue Ribbon Panel on Adjuvants," convened by Dr. Fauci at NIAID, NIH
- 2010 Millipub Club Award, Emory University
- 2009 – 2019 MERIT AWARD, NIAID, National Institutes of Health
- 2008 – 2011 Member of the AIDS Vaccine Research Subcommittee, NIAID, National Institutes of Health
- 2008 – 2017 Charles Howard Candler Professorship, Emory University
- Over 50 keynote lectures, including: Keynote lecture at the 2025 Cold Spring Harbor Symposium on Systems Immunology; President's Symposium at the annual meeting of the American Association of Immunologists (AAI) 2023; Peter Doherty Oration: Asia Pacific Vaccine and Immunotherapy Congress; Mary Lou Clements-Mann Memorial Lecturer in Vaccine Sciences at the Annual National Foundation for Infectious Diseases meeting; Opening Keynote Lecture, 3rd Institut Pasteur International Network Symposium, Paris, France; Keynote, Speaker, Annual International Society for Vaccines (ISV) Congress, Quebec City.
