= Residue-to-product ratio =

Measurement used in climate engineering

In climate engineering, the residue-to-product ratio (RPR) is used to calculate how much unused crop residue might be left after harvesting a particular crop. Also called the residue yield or straw/grain ratio, the equation takes the mass of residue divided by the mass of crop produced, and the result is dimensionless.

The RPR can be used to project costs and benefits of bio-energy projects, and is crucial in determining financial sustainability. The RPR is particularly important for estimating the production of biochar, a beneficial farm input obtained from crop residues through pyrolysis. However, RPR values are rough estimates taken from broad production statistics, and can vary greatly depending on crop variety, climate, processing, and residual moisture content.

== See also ==
- Carbon sequestration
- Biomass
- Biochar
- Biofuel
- Pyrolysis
