= Frontier Climate =

- Founded: 12 April 2022
- Founders: Stripe Alphabet, Inc. Shopify; Meta McKinsey Sustainability
- Type: Public benefit LLC
- Region served: Global
- Website: frontierclimate.com

Frontier Climate is an advance market commitment (AMC) that aggregates buyer demand to purchase permanent carbon dioxide removal (CDR) through 2030. It was launched on 12 April 2022 by Stripe, Alphabet, Shopify, Meta and McKinsey Sustainability with an initial target of over US$1 billion in purchases. Frontier operates through Delaware public benefit limited liability companies that are subsidiaries of Stripe, Inc.

Stripe publishes standards used by other parts of the Carbon Dioxide Removal community; the standards are designed to encourage investments in new kinds of CDR technologies.

== History ==
Frontier was announced on 12 April 2022 as a nine-year AMC to create a demand signal for permanent CDR. McKinsey Sustainability noted the founders’ initial US$925 million commitment the following day.

On 12 April 2023, Autodesk, H&M Group, JPMorgan Chase and Workday joined Frontier, adding US$100 million and bringing total purchasing commitments above US$1 billion.

In May 2023, Frontier buyers signed their first large offtake: US$53 million with Charm Industrial to remove 112,000 tons of CO_{2} (2024–2030). Other offtakes can be found listed below.

In 2024, Frontier announced multiple offtakes, including US$58.3 million with Vaulted Deep for 152,480 tons (2024–2027), US$48.6 million with Stockholm Exergi (BECCS) for deliveries in 2028–2030, and US$40 million with 280 Earth (DAC). Frontier buyers agreed the world’s first river-liming offtake with CarbonRun (US$25.4 million for 55,442 t CO_{2} to 2030).

In 2025, Frontier announced a fifth round of prepurchases for ocean alkalinity and mineralization startups. Reuters reported the prepurchase round and noted the coalition’s goals.

Also in July 2025 Frontier revealed a fifth prepurchase round (US$1.75 million) with early-stage firms Karbonetiq, Limenet and pHathom.

In June 2026, Frontier secured a $915 million advance market commitment from companies including Google, Anthropic, Stripe, and Salesforce to purchase permanent carbon removal credits.

=== Notable offtake investments ===
- Charm Industrial (BiCRS): US$53 million for 112,000 tons (2024–2030).
- Heirloom & CarbonCapture (DAC): announced on November 2023, US$46.6–47 million for 72,000 tons (2024–2030).
- Lithos Carbon (enhanced weathering): announced on 7 December 2023,US$57.1 million for 154,240 tons (2024–2028).
- Vaulted Deep (BiCRS): US$58.3 million for 152,480 tons (2024–2027).
- Stockholm Exergi (BECCS): US$48.6 million (deliveries 2028–2030).
- 280 Earth (DAC): US$40 million for 61,571 tons (2024–2030).
- Hafslund Celsio (waste-to-energy BECCS): purchesd in 2023 US$31.6 million for 100,000 tons (2029–2030).
- Eion -- announced 25 March 2025 an enhanced-weathering offtake (US$33 million; 78,707 t, 2027–2030) was announced.
- Phlair announced on 27 February 2025 (US$30.6 million; 47,000 t by 2030).
- Arbor -- US$41 million BECCS offtake announced on 8 July 2025 for 116,000 t (2028–2030).

== Model ==
Frontier publishes procurement criteria and pathway-specific rubrics, and requires third-party verification and registry issuance for offtake deliveries; prepurchases carry no recourse if suppliers fail to deliver. In 2024 it open-sourced a standard offtake agreement template.

== Governance and structure ==
Frontier is organized as Frontier Climate, LLC; Frontier Climate Management, LLC; and Frontier Climate Operations, LLC—each a Delaware public benefit limited liability company and subsidiaries of Stripe, Inc.

== Reception ==
Independent reporting has covered Frontier’s large CDR purchases and the AMC’s role in seeding early demand, including Axios coverage of the first Charm Industrial deal in 2023 and subsequent DAC offtakes in 2023, and Reuters reporting on 2025 prepurchases for ocean and mineralization approaches. Sector analyses by CDR.fyi consistently points to the limited number of buyers controlling the market, concentrated in Microsoft, Google and Frontier in 2024.

== See also ==
- Advance market commitment
- Carbon dioxide removal
- Direct air capture
- Enhanced weathering
- Bioenergy with carbon capture and storage
