= Biochar carbon removal =

Negative emissions technology

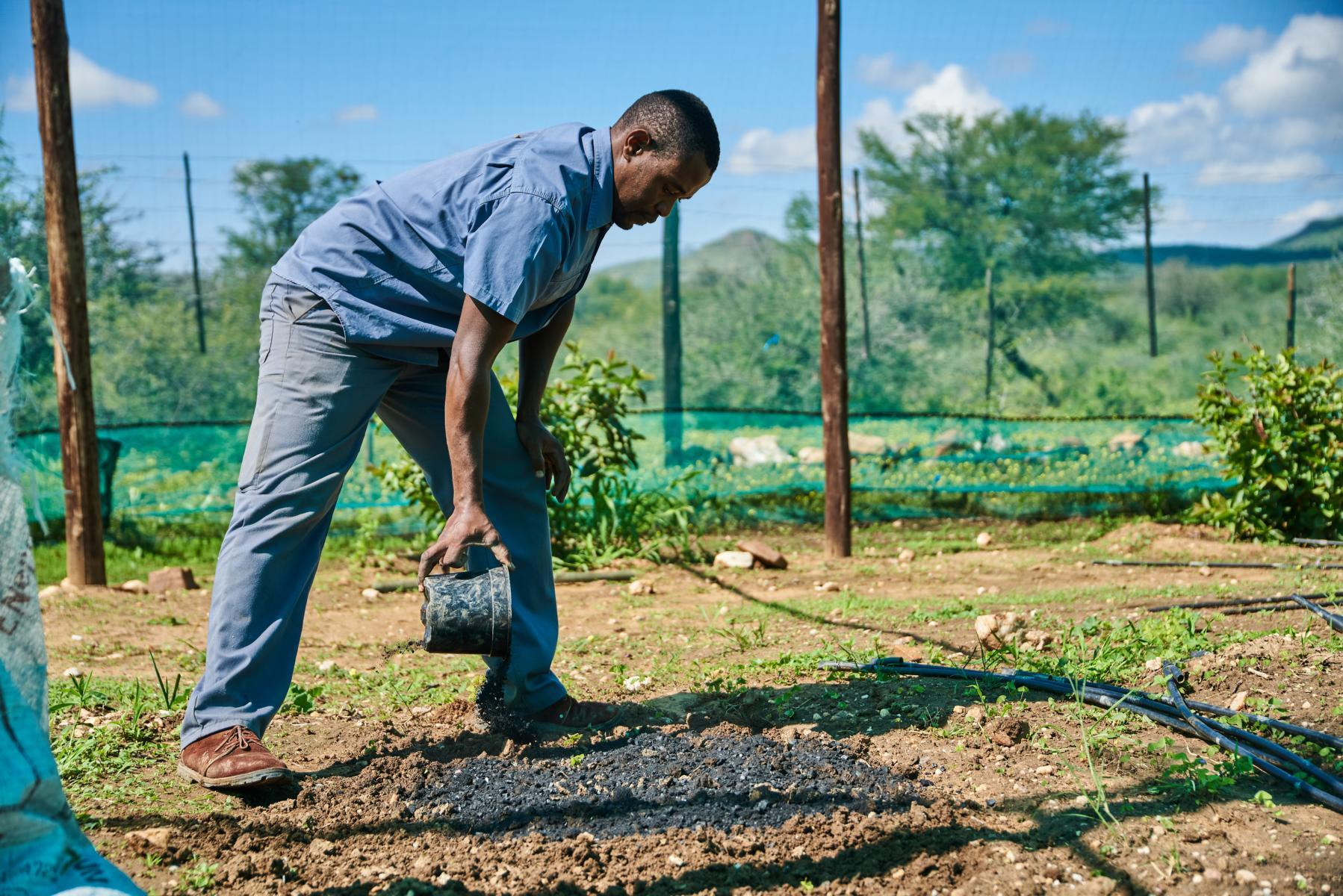
Biochar applied to the soil in research trials in Namibia

Biochar carbon removal (also called pyrogenic carbon capture and storage) is a negative emissions technology. It involves the production of biochar through pyrolysis of residual biomass and the subsequent application of the biochar in soils or durable materials (e.g. cement, tar). Biochar locks carbon from biomass into a stable, charcoal-like form that can persist in soils for centuries to millennia, instead of returning to the atmosphere as CO_{2}.

Multi-pool modelling of biochar soil amendments indicates a centennial – millennial turnover rate, depending on factors like feedstocks used, production conditions, application rates and the characteristics of depositional sites. However, a re-analysis of the metadata underlying the two-pool decay model has identified significant parameterisation deficiencies, finding that the labile carbon fraction (C1) is disproportionately small (median 0.6%) and effectively reduces the model to a single-pool approach that overestimates biochar decay rates. Additionally, biochar and related residues (i.e. pyrogenic carbon) have been demonstrated to have the potential for wider carbon cycling effects such as suppressing greenhouse gas (GHG) fluxes from amended soils and benefitting vegetation growth.

In some cases amendment studies and meta-analyses have pointed to undesired effects of biochar soil amendments, such as sub-centennial biochar turnover (though such estimates may partly reflect parameterisation deficiencies in the underlying decay models rather than actual biochar instability), increased GHG fluxes and degradation of non-biochar soil carbon stocks. Biochar carbon removal can thus be deployed as a targeted strategy, for example with appropriate application rates, feedstocks and production conditions for the intended application site.

== Definition ==
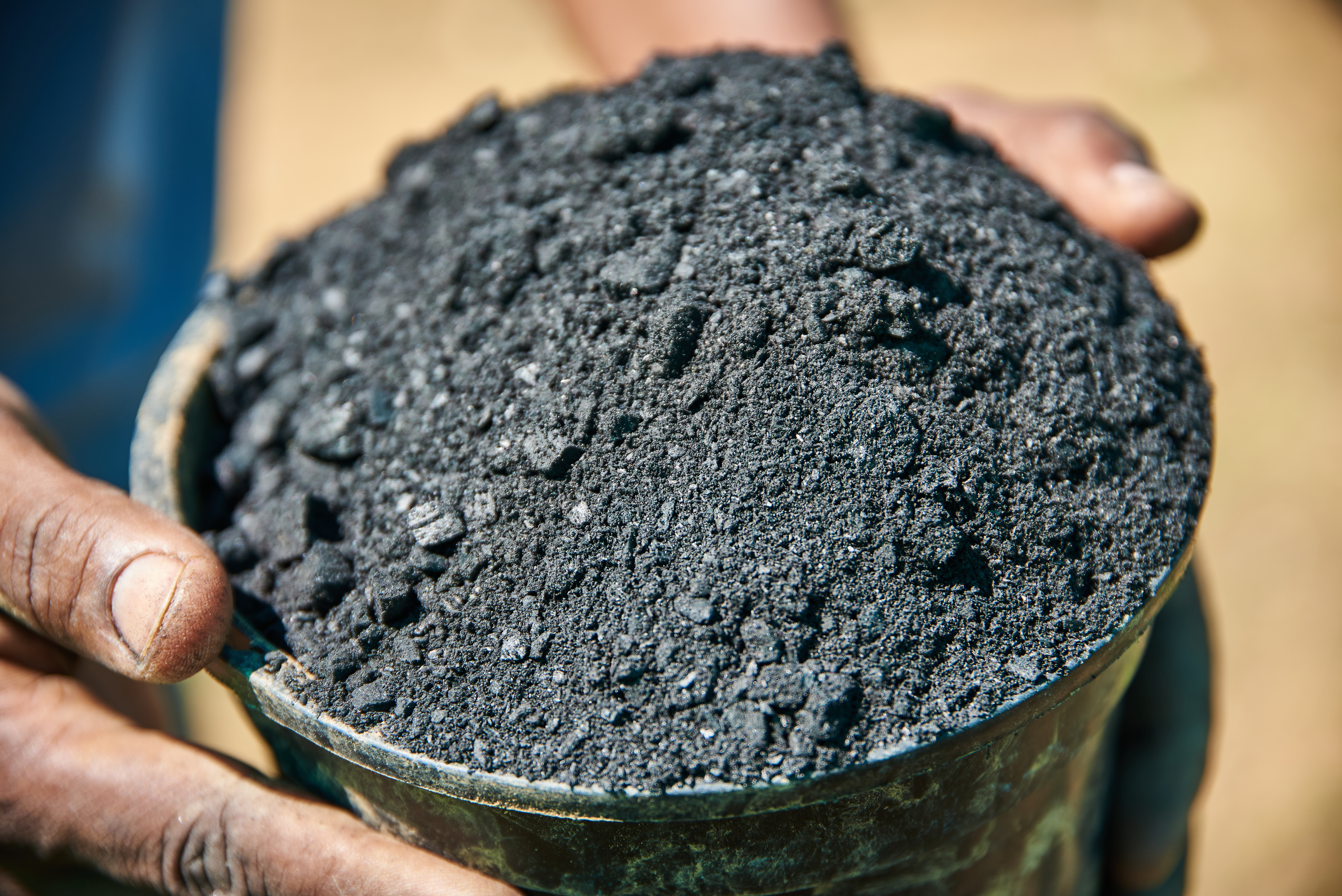
Charged and inoculated biochar ready for soil application

The term refers to the practice of producing biochar from sustainably sourced biomass and ensuring that it is stored for a long period of time. The concept makes use of the photosynthesis process, through which plants remove CO_{2} from the atmosphere during their growth. This carbon dioxide is stabilised within the biochar during the production process and can subsequently be stored potentially for several hundreds or thousands of years.

Biochar Carbon Removal falls into the category of carbon dioxide removal (CDR) technologies. It is considered to be a rapidly implemented and, relatively speaking, capital-efficient negative emissions technology ideal for smaller scale installations such as farmers, and also to help rural diversification in developing countries. This is, amongst others, reflected in the guidance documents of the Science Based Targets initiative.

Scientifically, this process is often referred to as Pyrogenic Carbon Capture and Storage (PyCCS). The term biochar carbon removal was introduced by the European Biochar Industry Consortium in 2023 and has since been adopted by various institutions and experts.

Biochar Carbon Removal can also be categorised as a form of Biomass Carbon Removal and Storage (BiCRS).

Beyond carbon sequestration, biochar application has various other potential benefits, such as increased yield and root biomass, water use efficiency and microbial activity.

== Biochar production ==
Biochar is produced through the pyrolysis process. Biomass (e.g. residual plant material from landscaping or agricultural processes) is reduced to smaller pieces is heated to 350–900 °C (662–1,652 °F) under oxygen-deficient conditions. This results in solid biochar and by-products (bio-oil, pyrogas). In order to maximise the carbon storage potential, typically those biochar technologies are used that minimise combustion and avoid the loss of pyrogas into the atmosphere.

In low-oxygen conditions, the thermal-chemical conversion of organic materials (including biomass) produces both volatiles, termed pyrolytic gases (pyrogases), as well as solid carbonaceous co-products, termed biochar. While the pyrogases mostly condense into liquid bio-oil, which may be used as an energy source, biochar has been proposed as a tool for sequestering carbon in soil.

The global biochar market is expected to reach US$368.85 million by 2028.

Internationally there are several voluntary standards that regulate the biochar production process and product quality. These include the following (non-exhaustive list):

- European Biochar Certificate (EBC) and World Biochar Certificate (WBC) developed by the Ithaka Institute
- The U.S. Environmental Protection Agency (EPA)
- The International Biochar Initiative

== Carbon removal potential ==
=== Global scope ===
Three main carbonaceous products are generated during pyrolysis, which can be stored subsequently in different ways to produce negative emissions: a solid biochar for various applications, a pyrolytic liquid (bio-oil) pumped into depleted fossil oil repositories, and permanent-pyrogas (dominated by the combustible gases CO, H_{2} and CH_{4}) that may be transferred as CO_{2} to geological storage after combustion.

In 2022/2023, biochar carbon removal accounted for 87–92% of all delivered carbon removals.

The potential extent of carbon removal with biochar is the subject of ongoing research. Using current waste from the farming and forestry industry worldwide, an estimated 6% of global emissions, equivalent to 3 billion tonnes of CO_{2}, could be removed annually over a 100-year time frame. More broadly, the potential is quantified to be between 0.3 and 4.9 billion tonnes of CO_{2} per year (GtCO_{2} / yr).

=== Permanence ===
Permanence in carbon products is a good indicator of the quality or durability of the material. It also describes the amount of time that carbon can be stored in a material. Biochar is produced by rapidly carbonizing organic matter into maceral. There is evidence that biochar, produced at pyrolysis temperature over 600 °C (1,112 °F), resembles inertinite and thus highly stable. Research suggests that the permanance and therewith removal potential of biochar is generally underestimated due to oversimplified methodologies, including parameterisation deficiencies in the prevalent two-pool decay model that effectively apply labile-fraction decay constants to the entire biochar mass.

The level to which carbon dioxide is fixed and stored, depends both on the biochar production process and the subsequent application. If produced under certain conditions, 97% of the total organic carbon in biochar is highly refractory carbon, i.e. carbon that has near infinite stability. This implies that biochar can have a very high permanence in terms of carbon dioxide storage. Achieving effective pyrolisis is therefore an important requirement for high permanence. For biochar produced at temperatures between 350 °C and 800 °C, the measured labile carbon fraction ranges from approximately 16% to 1%, and incubation experiments to date have primarily captured the degradation of this labile fraction, leaving the decay rate of the recalcitrant fraction empirically unquantified.

=== Applications ===
There are several applications that are considered to store CO_{2} for long periods of time:

- Soil application: Once mixed into soil, biochar, which is less susceptible to remineralization into CO_{2} and CH_{4} than non-pyrogenic biomass, fragments into micro- and nano-particles which can be transported to deeper soil horizons, groundwater, or other compartments that further protect it from degradation. Multiple studies have demonstrated that pyrogenic carbon is stable over centennial timescales. The impact on soil fertility is context dependent, but largely positive. It is estimated that biochar soil application could sequester 2.5 gigatons (Gt) of CO_{2} annually.
- Additive for construction material
  - Cement Particleboards: Adding biochar into cement mixtures is still a work in progress and will take time to figure out exact calculations. In general, when mixed with cement, biochar does not impact the usefulness of cement mixtures. Biochar is a porous material and many benefits come when mixed with cement. It is lightweight, provides good insulation and contains humidity regulation properties.
- Additive in asphalts
  - While still being studied and placed through various tests to determine more about its properties so far the results for mixing biochar material in asphalt have been promising. Asphalt is known to degrade in the elements rather quickly and has low durability due to the wear and tear done upon it. Biochar additives have proven to not only boost asphalt's overall durability but also its heat resistance. One proposed idea is using agricultural byproducts such as crop straw as a biochar additive to asphalt, therefore increasing the economic value of not only the crop but also the durability of the affected asphalt.
- Additive in plastics, paper and textiles
  - The addition of biochar to plastic creates a composite, consisting of a matrix and filler phase. Plastic would be the main material in the composite and biochar would be added as a reinforcement for better thermal stability and resistance to moisture. When added to recycled plastics, biochar increases the strength and stiffness. The co-pyrolysis of plastics and biochar also decreases the costs and increases the efficiency of production.

== Biochar-based carbon credits ==
Biochar Carbon Removal is increasingly seen as a promising negative emissions technology suitable for offsetting and carbon markets. Due to significant carbon abatement cost levels of biochar carbon removal, biochar carbon credits trade at prices an order of magnitude higher than carbon credits based on conventional mitigation methods such as emission reductions and nature-based solutions. Biochar Carbon credits are considered by some to be the best type of Carbon credit as they increase economic viability of the companies claiming them, and biochar stays in soil for hundreds if not thousands of years, ensuring that carbon is locked away from the atmosphere.

=== Market size ===
Demand for biochar credits is increasing but trade in biochar carbon removal credits is still limited to a small number of suppliers and credit off-takers. In 2024, biochar projects made up the majority of carbon dioxide removal (CDR) purchases, representing 86% of the total volume bought.

=== Standards ===
For the purpose of generating carbon credits, there are several internationally recognised voluntary biochar standards and methodologies. These include the following (non-exhaustive list):

- VERRA VM0044
- Puro.Earth Biochar Methodology (Finland)
- CSI Global Artisanal C-Sink
- Nori (USA)
- MoorFutures (Germany)
- max.moor (Switzerland)
- Compensate (Finland)

Several biochar production and carbon credit standards define criteria for permissible biomass feedstocks for biochar carbon removal. For example, the European Biochar Certificate (EBC) features a positive list of permissible biomasses for the production of biochar. This list includes agricultural residues, cultivated biomass, residues from forestry operations and sawmills, residues from landscaping activities, recycled feedstock, kitchen waste, food processing residues, textiles, anaerobic digestion, sludges from wastewater treatment, and animal by-products.

In order for a credit to be certified, suppliers must be carbon net-negative, meaning they sequester more carbon than they use in the creation and distribution of biochar.

A growing number of startups offer to scale biochar production in the Global South via the sale of carbon credits. Examples include Tanzanian startup Dark Earth Carbon (DEC), which is supported through the UK Foreign, Commonwealth & Development Office’s Green Growth Facility (International Climate Finance). A growing number of active initiatives around the world are marketing biochar projects and carbon credits.

== See also ==
- Climate change scenario
- Climate engineering
- List of emerging technologies
- Dark earth
- Terra preta
- Anthrosols
