= Charm Industrial =

American carbon dioxide removal company

Charm Industrial is a carbon dioxide removal company that uses pyrolysis of crop residues and wildfire risk biomass to create biooil that can be pumped into geological storage for long-term biomass carbon removal and storage. Charm is one of the companies that received an advanced market commitment from Frontier Climate.

In 2023, they received a US$54 million advanced market commitment from Frontier to sequester 112,000 tons of carbon dioxide. It also received 100 million dollars in Series B funding. In January 2025, it also received adding contracts from Google, the largest carbon removal contract ever purchased.

The company primarily uses crop waste such as corn stover as its source for pyrolysis. Once the biooil is produced, the oil is injected into wells that have geological storage. Charm is exploring use of the biooil for other purposes, such as iron refining.

The company is notable for hiring oil and gas field workers for carbon sequestration.
