= Biochar =

Lightweight black residue, made of carbon and ashes, after pyrolysis of biomass

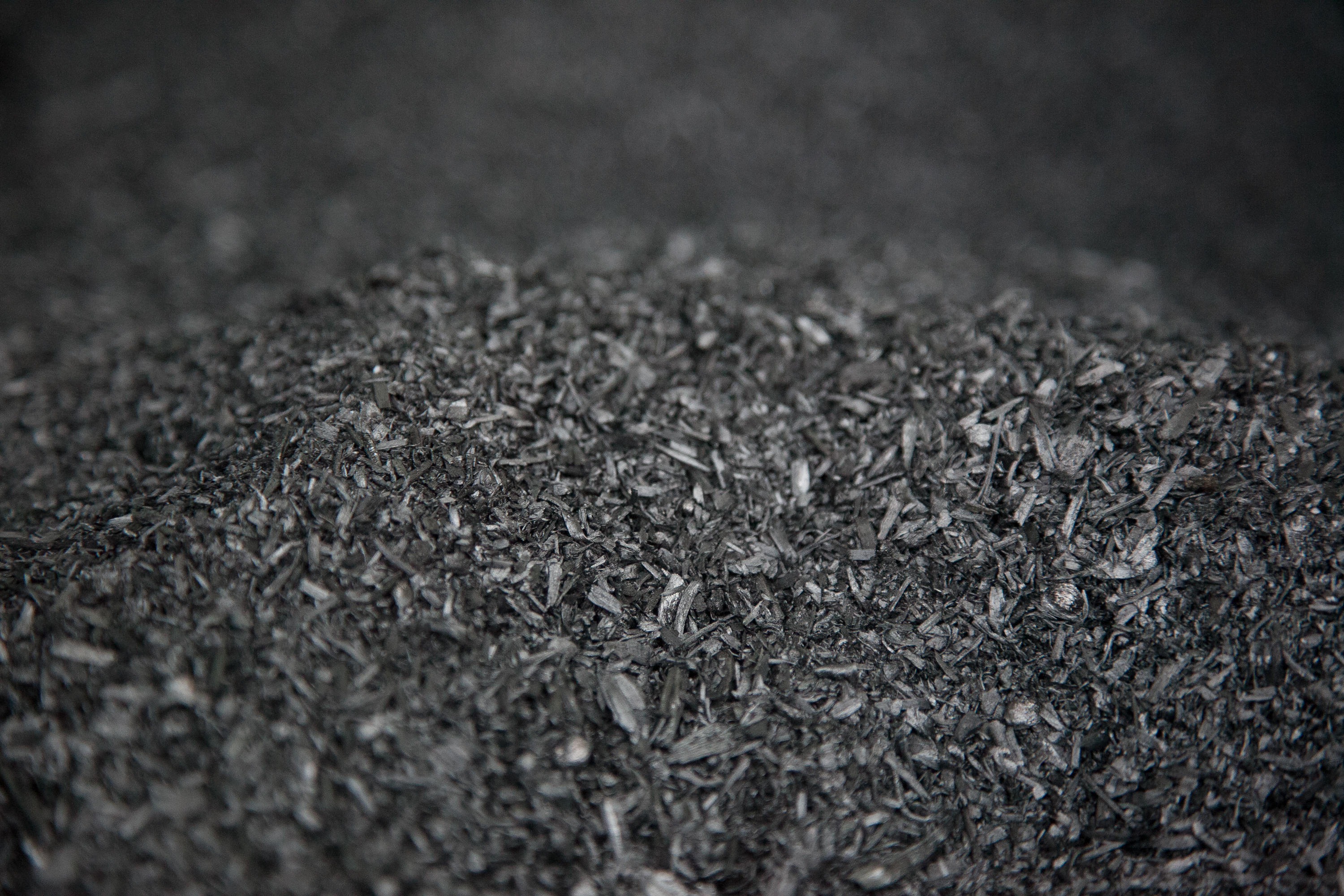
A pile of biochar

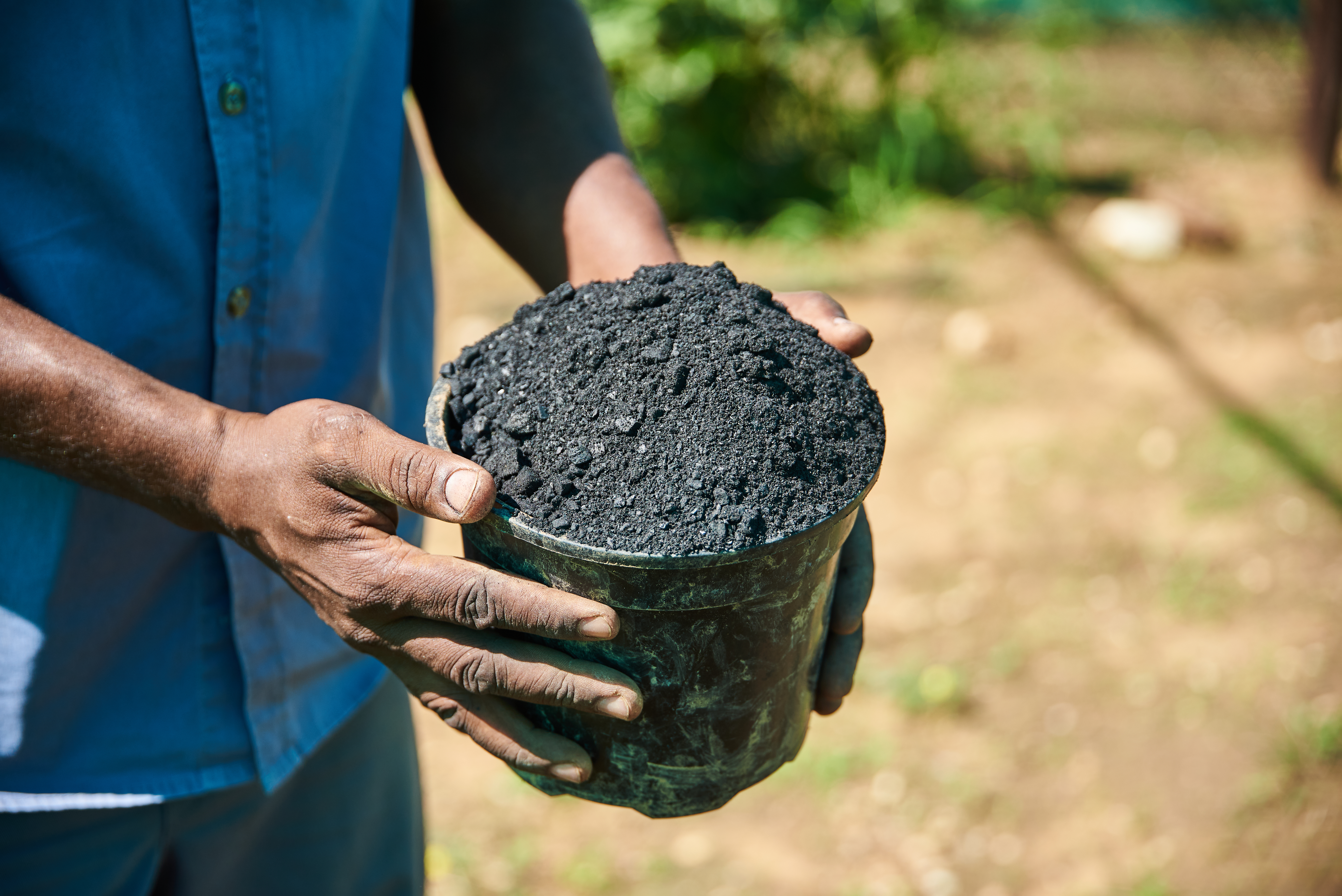
Biochar mixture ready for soil application

Biochar is a form of charcoal, sometimes modified, that is intended for organic use, as in soil. It is the lightweight black remnants of the pyrolysis of biomass, consisting of carbon and ashes. Despite its name, biochar is sterile immediately after production and only gains biological life following assisted or incidental exposure to biota. Biochar is defined by the International Biochar Initiative as the "solid material obtained from the thermochemical conversion of biomass in an oxygen-limited environment".

Biochar is mainly used in soils to increase soil aeration, reduce soil emissions of greenhouse gases, improve soil fertility, reduce nutrient leaching, reduce soil acidity, and potentially increase the water content of coarse soils. Biochar application may increase soil fertility and agricultural productivity. However, when applied excessively or made from feedstock unsuitable for the soil type, biochar soil amendments also have the potential for negative effects, including harming soil biota, reducing available water content, altering soil pH, and increasing salinity.

Beyond soil application, biochar can be used for slash-and-char farming, for water retention in soil, and as an additive for animal fodder. There is an increasing focus on the potential role of biochar application in global climate change mitigation. Due to its refractory stability, biochar can stay in soils or other environments for thousands of years. This has given rise to the concept of biochar carbon removal, a process of carbon sequestration in the form of biochar. Carbon removal can be achieved when high-quality biochar is applied to soils, or added as a substitute material to construction materials such as concrete and tar.

== Etymology ==
The word "biochar" is a late-20th century English neologism derived from the Greek word 'βίος' (bios, 'life') and 'char' (charcoal produced by carbonization of biomass). It is recognized as charcoal that participates in biological processes found in soil, aquatic habitats, and animal digestive systems.Biochar is understood to be a type of charcoal that is intended to support life on earth as a means for sequestering carbon, whether it is used in building materials (like concrete and other hardscaping or paper packaging, etc) or in soils. Biochar was not defined as charcoal that is biologically active when the term was coined, and this difference in understanding/use of the term is hotly contested by the general public in online communities.

== History ==
Pre-Columbian Amazonians produced biochar by smoldering agricultural waste (i.e., covering burning biomass with soil) in pits or trenches. It is not known if they intentionally used biochar to enhance soil productivity. European settlers called it terra preta de Indio. Following observations and experiments, one research team working in French Guiana hypothesized that the Amazonian earthworm Pontoscolex corethrurus was the main agent of fine powdering and incorporation of charcoal debris in the mineral soil.

== Production ==
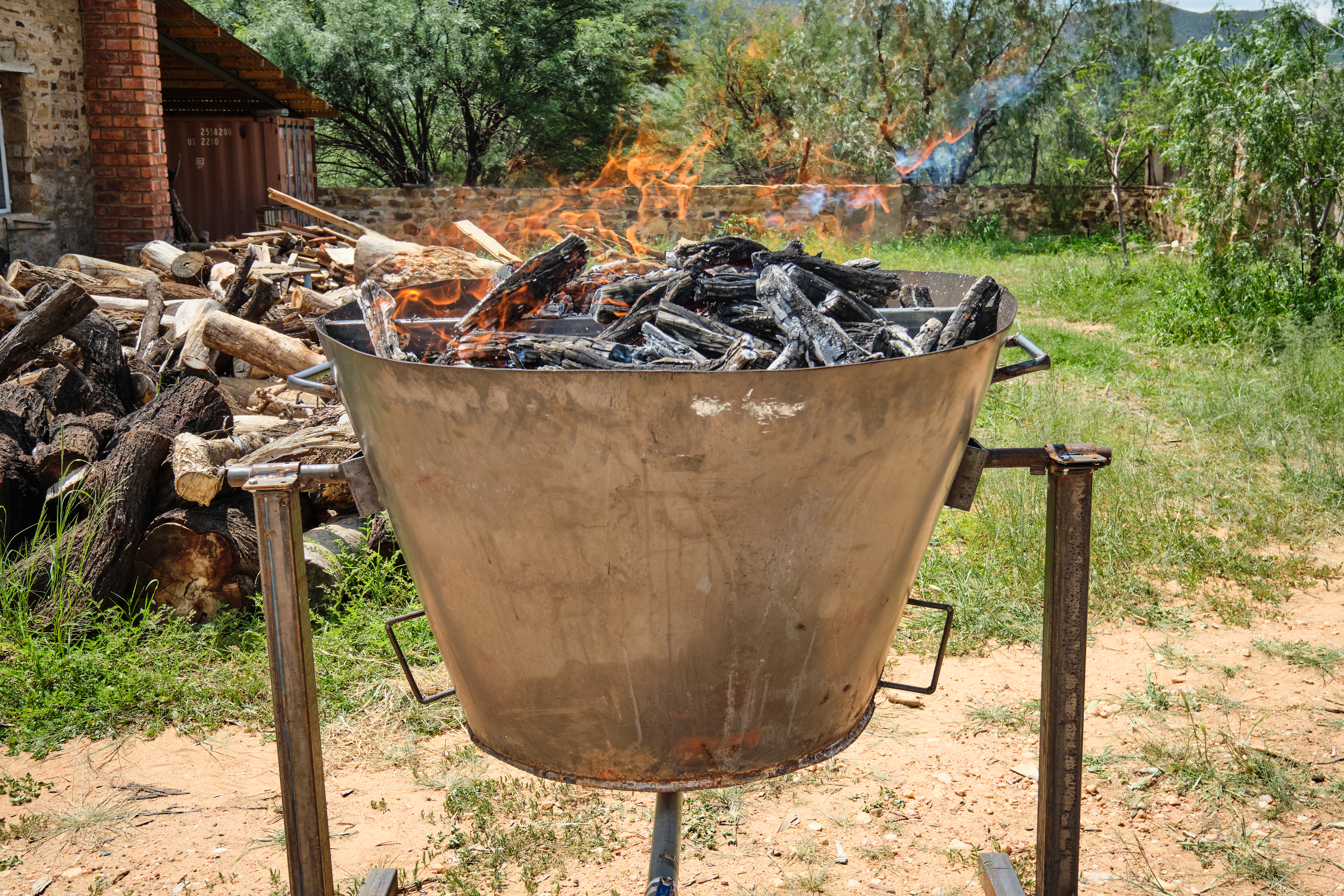
Artisanal biochar production in a Kon-tiki kiln

Biochar is a high-carbon, fine-grained residue that is produced via pyrolysis. It is the direct thermal decomposition of biomass in the absence of oxygen, which prevents combustion, and produces a mixture of solids (biochar), liquid (bio-oil), and gas (syngas) products.

=== Gasification ===
Gasifiers produce most of the biochar sold in the United States. The gasification process consists of four main stages: oxidation, drying, pyrolysis, and reduction. Temperature during pyrolysis in gasifiers is 250–550 °C (523–823 K), 600–800 °C (873–1,073 K) in the reduction zone, and 800–1,000 °C (1,070–1,270 K) in the combustion zone.

The specific yield from pyrolysis (the step of gasification that produces biochar) is dependent on process conditions such as temperature, heating rate, and residence time. These parameters can be tuned to produce either more energy or more biochar. Temperatures of 400–500 °C (673–773 K) produce more char, whereas temperatures above 700 °C (973 K) favor the yield of liquid and gas fuel components. Pyrolysis occurs more quickly at higher temperatures, typically requiring seconds rather than hours. The increasing heating rate leads to a decrease in biochar yield, while the temperature is in the range of 350–600 °C (623–873 K). Typical yields are 60% bio-oil, 20% biochar, and 20% syngas. By comparison, slow pyrolysis can produce substantially more char (≈35%); this contributes to soil fertility. Once initialized, both processes produce net energy. For typical inputs, the energy required to run a "fast" pyrolyzer is approximately 15% of the energy that it outputs. Pyrolysis plants can use the syngas output and yield 3–9 times the amount of energy required to run.

The Amazonian pit/trench method, in contrast, harvests neither bio-oil nor syngas, and releases CO_{2}, black carbon, and other greenhouse gases (GHGs) (and potentially, toxicants) into the air, though less greenhouse gasses than captured during the growth of the biomass. Commercial-scale systems process agricultural waste, paper byproducts, and even municipal waste and typically eliminate these side effects by capturing and using the liquid and gas products. The 2018 winner of the X Prize Foundation for atmospheric water generators harvests potable water from the drying stage of the gasification process. The production of biochar as an output is not a priority in most cases.

=== Small-scale methods ===
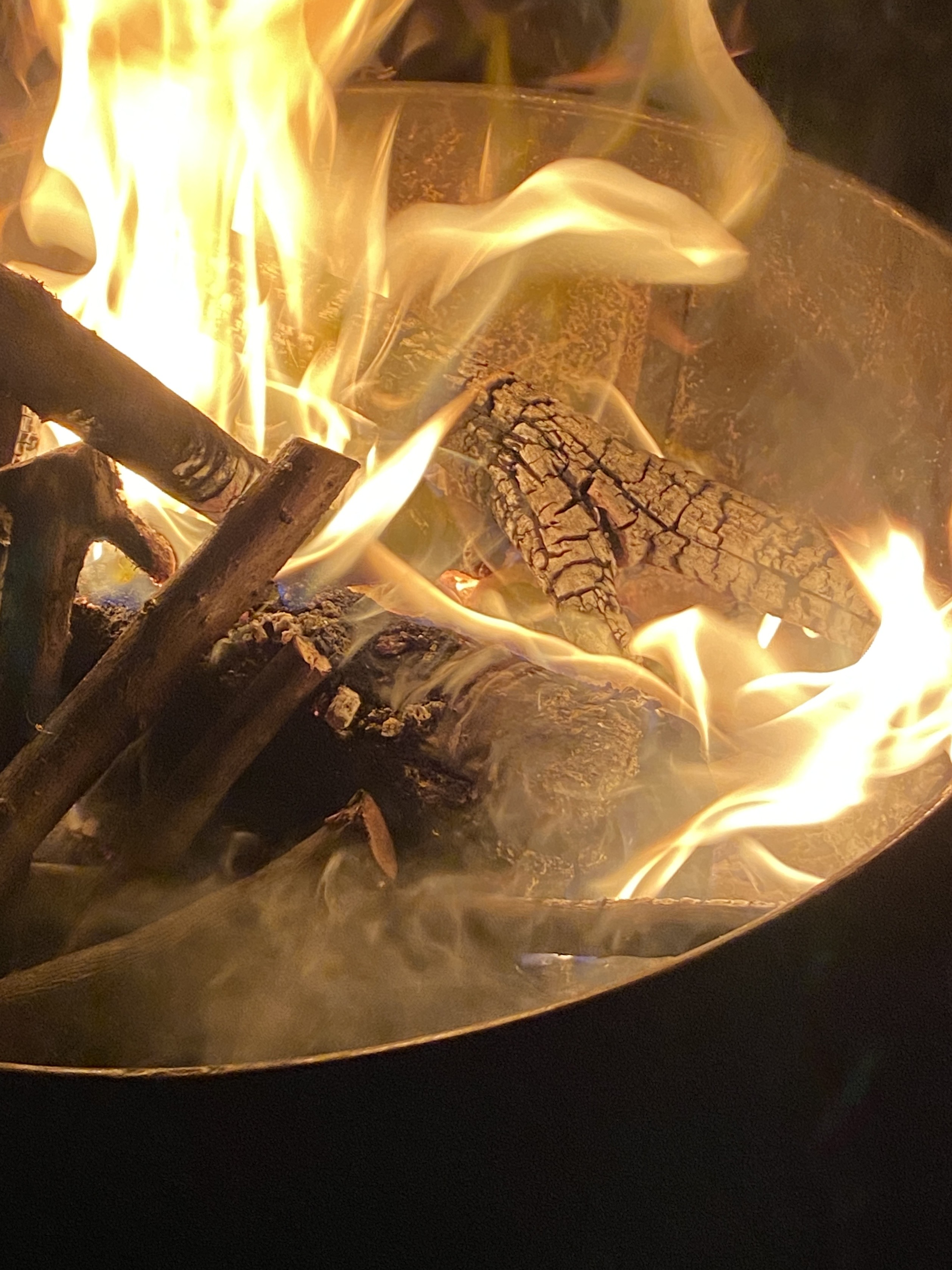
Smallholder biochar production with fruit-orchard prunings

Smallholder farmers in developing countries easily produce their own biochar without special equipment. They make piles of crop waste (e.g., maize stalks, rice straw, or wheat straw), light the piles on the top, and quench the embers with dirt or water to make biochar. This method greatly reduces smoke compared to traditional methods of burning crop waste. This method is known as the top-down burn or conservation burn.

Alternatively, more industrial methods can be used on small scales. While in a centralized system, unused biomass is brought to a central plant for processing into biochar, it is also possible for each farmer or group of farmers to operate a kiln. In this scenario, a truck equipped with a pyrolyzer moves from place to place to pyrolyze biomass. Vehicle power comes from the syngas stream, while the biochar remains on the farm. The biofuel is sent to a refinery or storage site. Factors that influence the choice of system type include the cost of transportation of the liquid and solid byproducts, the amount of material to be processed, and the ability to supply the power grid.

Various companies in North America, Australia, and England also sell biochar or biochar production units. In Sweden, the 'Stockholm Solution' is an urban tree planting system that uses 30% biochar to support urban forest growth. At the 2009 International Biochar Conference, a mobile pyrolysis unit with a specified intake of 1,000 pounds (450 kg) was introduced for agricultural applications.

=== Crops used ===
Common crops used for making biochar include various tree species, as well as various energy crops. Some of these energy crops (i.e. Napier grass) can store much more carbon on a shorter timespan than trees do.

For crops that are not exclusively for biochar production, the residue-to-product ratio (RPR) and the collection factor (CF), the percent of the residue not used for other things, measure the approximate amount of feedstock that can be obtained. For instance, Brazil harvests approximately 460 million tons (MT) of sugarcane annually, with an RPR of 0.30, and a CF of 0.70 for the sugarcane tops, which normally are burned in the field. This translates into approximately 100 MT of residue annually, which could be pyrolyzed to create energy and soil additives. Adding in the bagasse (sugarcane waste) (RPR=0.29, CF=1.0), which is otherwise burned (inefficiently) in boilers, raises the total to 230 MT of pyrolysis feedstock. Some plant residue, however, must remain on the soil to avoid increased costs and emissions from nitrogen fertilizers. Apart from the use of traditional crops for biochar production, waste and by-products from specific agricultural industries can also be used as feedstock. For example, regions with high wine production can utilize grape residues and pomace left over from winemaking and spirit distillation, thus recycling at the same time as help reduce their carbon print and environmental impact.

=== Hydrocha ===
Besides pyrolysis, torrefaction and hydrothermal carbonization processes can also thermally decompose biomass to the solid material. However, these products cannot be strictly defined as biochar. The carbon product from the torrefaction process contains some volatile organic components; thus its properties are between that of biomass feedstock and biochar. And although hydrothermal carbonization can produce a carbon-rich solid product, the process is evidently different from the conventional thermal conversion process, so the product is therefore defined as "hydrochar" rather than "biochar".

=== Thermo-catalytic depolymerization ===
Thermo-catalytic depolymerization is another method to produce biochar, which utilizes microwaves. It has been used to efficiently convert organic matter to biochar on an industrial scale, producing about 50% char.

== Properties ==
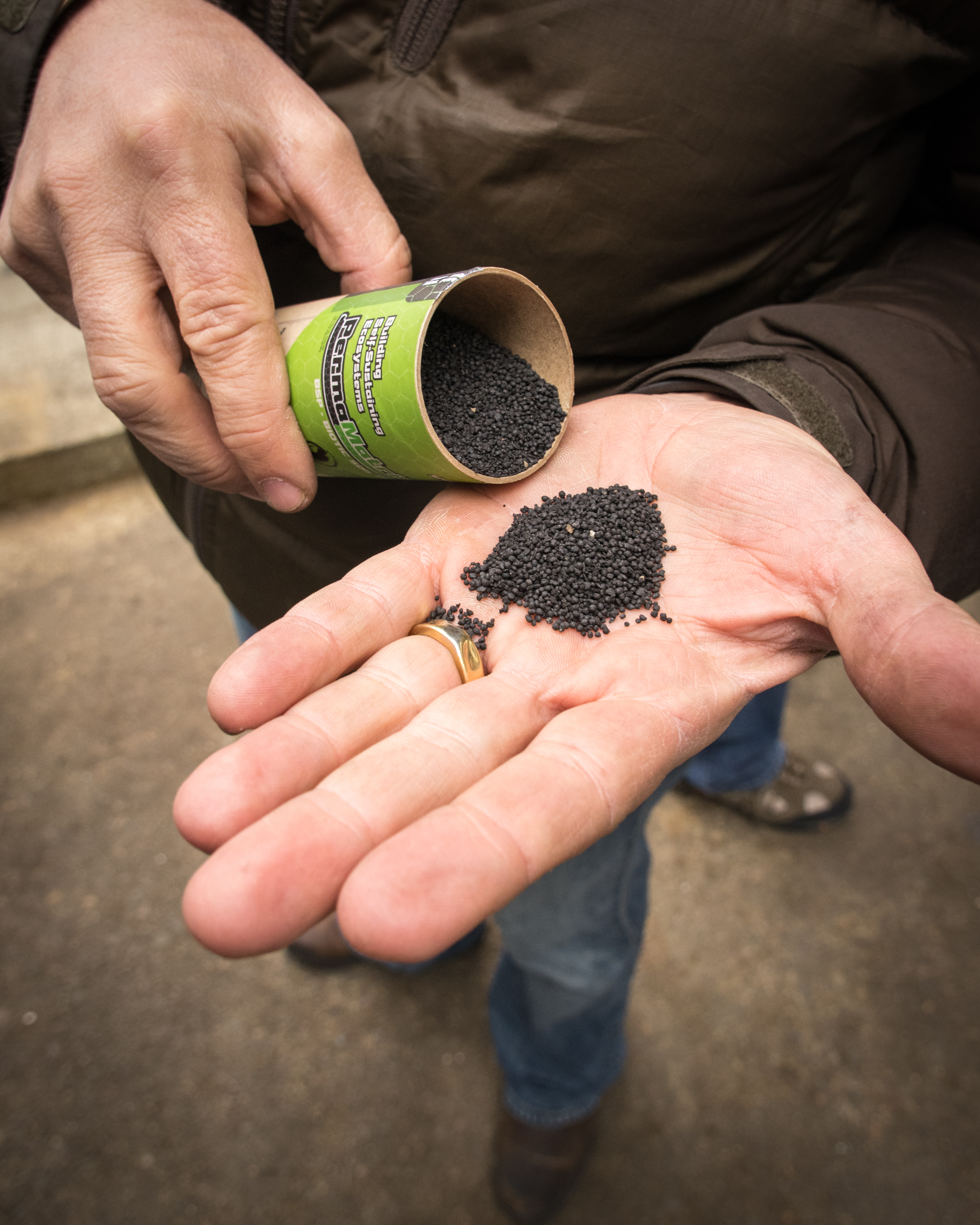
Smaller pellets of biochar

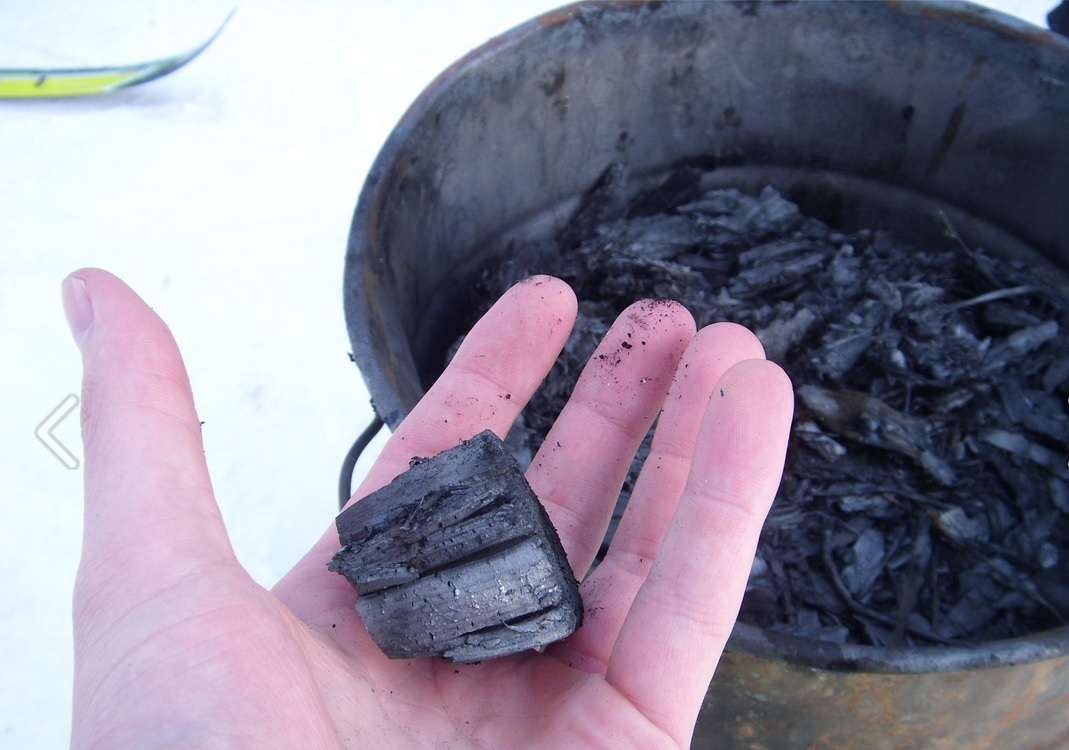
Biochar produced from residual wood

The physical and chemical properties of biochars as determined by feedstocks and technologies are crucial. Characterization data explain their performance in a specific use. For example, guidelines published by the International Biochar Initiative provide standardized evaluation methods. Properties can be categorized in several respects, including the proximate and elemental composition, pH value, and porosity. The atomic ratios of biochar, including H/C and O/C, correlate with the properties that are relevant to organic content, such as polarity and aromaticity. A van-Krevelen diagram can show the evolution of biochar atomic ratios in the production process. In the carbonization process, both the H/C and O/C atomic ratios decrease due to the release of functional groups that contain hydrogen and oxygen.

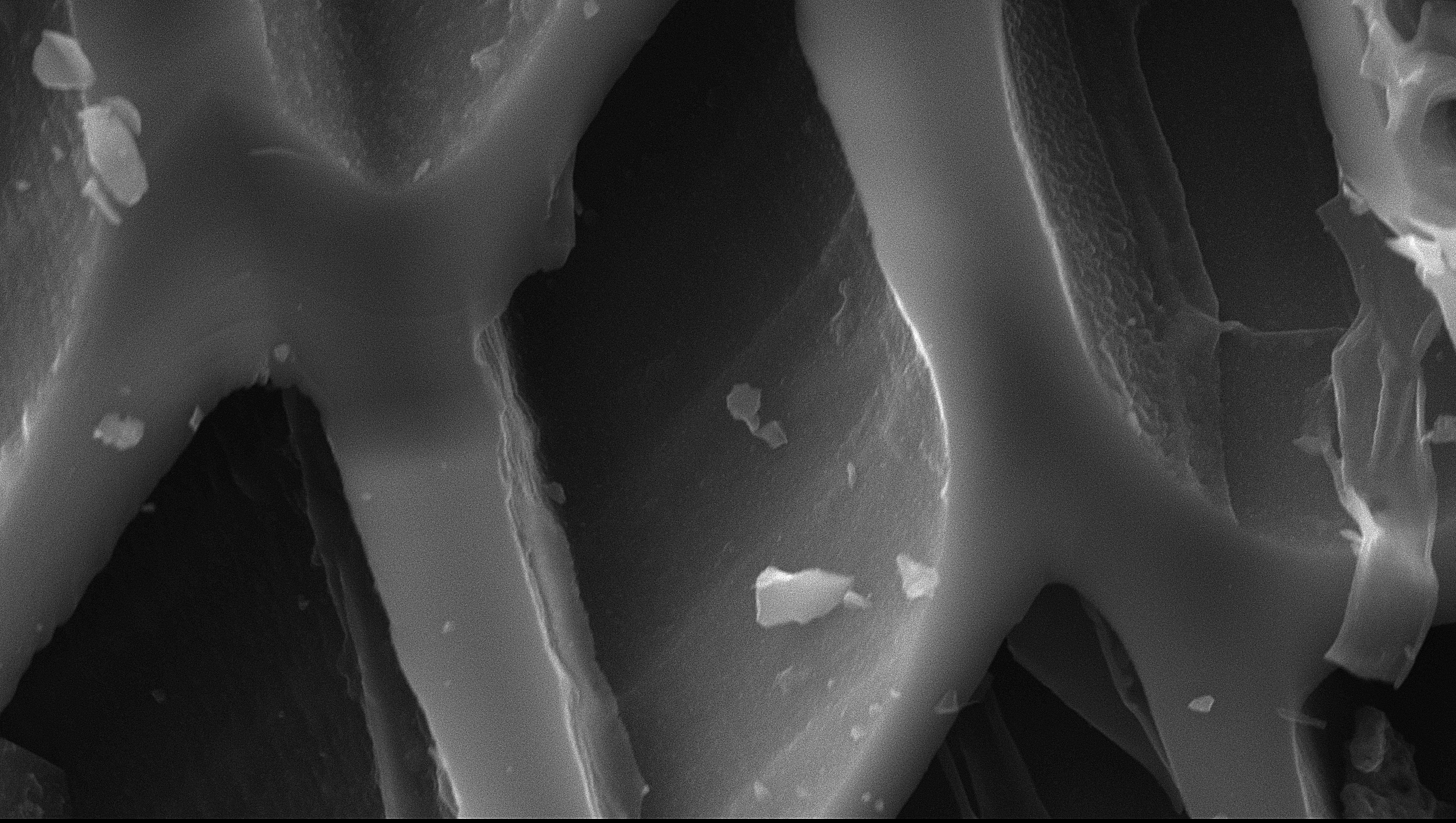
Scanning electron image of biochar shows detailed morphology

Production temperatures influence biochar properties in several ways. The molecular carbon structure of the solid biochar matrix is particularly affected. Initial pyrolysis at 450–550 °C leaves an amorphous carbon structure. Temperatures above this range will result in the progressive thermochemical conversion of amorphous carbon into turbostratic graphene sheets. Biochar conductivity also increases with production temperature. Important to carbon capture, aromaticity and intrinsic recalcitrance increases with temperature.

== Applications ==
=== Carbon sink ===
The refractory stability of biochar leads to the concept of biochar carbon removal, a process of carbon sequestration in the form of biochar. It may be a means to mitigate climate change due to its potential of sequestering carbon with minimal effort. Biomass burning and natural decomposition releases large amounts of carbon dioxide and methane to the Earth's atmosphere. The biochar production process also releases CO_{2} (up to 50% of the biomass); however, the remaining carbon content becomes indefinitely stable. Biochar carbon remains in the ground for centuries, slowing the growth in atmospheric greenhouse gas levels. Simultaneously, its presence in the earth can improve water quality, increase soil fertility, raise agricultural productivity, and reduce pressure on old-growth forests.

Biochar can sequester carbon in the soil for hundreds to thousands of years, like coal. According to the World Bank, "biochar retains between 10 percent and 70 percent (on average about 50 percent) of the carbon present in the original biomass and slows down the rate of carbon decomposition by one or two orders of magnitude, that is, in the scale of centuries or millennia". Early works proposing the use of biochar for carbon dioxide removal to create a long-term stable carbon sink were published in the early 2000s. This technique is advocated by scientists including James Hansen and James Lovelock.

A 2010 report estimated that sustainable use of biochar could reduce the global net emissions of carbon dioxide (CO_{2}), methane, and nitrous oxide by up to 1.8 billion tonnes carbon dioxide equivalent (CO_{2}e) per year (compared to the about 50 billion tonnes emitted in 2021), without endangering food security, habitats, or soil conservation. However a 2018 study doubted enough biomass would be available to achieve significant carbon sequestration. A 2021 review estimated potential CO_{2} removal from 1.6 to 3.2 billion tonnes per year, and by 2023 it had become a lucrative business renovated by carbon credits.

As of 2023, the significance of biochar's potential as a carbon sink is widely accepted. Biochar was found to have the technical potential to sequester 7% of carbon dioxide on average across all countries, with twelve nations able to sequester over 20% of their greenhouse gas emissions—Bhutan leads this proportion (68%), followed by India (53%).

In 2021 the cost of biochar ranged around European carbon prices, but was not yet included in the EU or UK Emissions Trading Scheme.

Biochar adsorption of CO_{2} can be limited by the surface area of the material, which can be improved by using resonant acoustic mixing.

In developing countries, biochar derived from improved cookstoves for home-use can reduce carbon emissions (when the traditional cookstove is discontinued), as well as achieve other benefits for sustainable development.

Biochar has been proposed as a negative emissions technology with substantial long term climate mitigation potential. While early scenario studies focused on technical maxima and suggested that several gigatonnes of CO_{2} equivalent could be avoided annually, more recent work emphasizes that economically feasible deployment is likely to be smaller, with global removal potentials of roughly 0.3–1.8 Gt CO_{2} per year under carbon prices below US$100 per tonne. Real world implementation remains at an early stage: global biochar production is estimated to be on the order of a few hundred thousand tonnes per year, delivering well under 1 Mt CO_{2} per year of certified removal, though voluntary carbon market deliveries and installed capacity have grown quickly in recent years. Because feedstock availability, logistics and co product use strongly influence costs, some applications are currently viable only where biochar provides additional agronomic or environmental benefits or can access carbon removal credits. The rapid expansion of publications on biochar has led to concerns in the literature that expectations for its climate role could trigger a 'boom and bust' cycle if projected benefits are not realized at scale.

=== Soil health ===
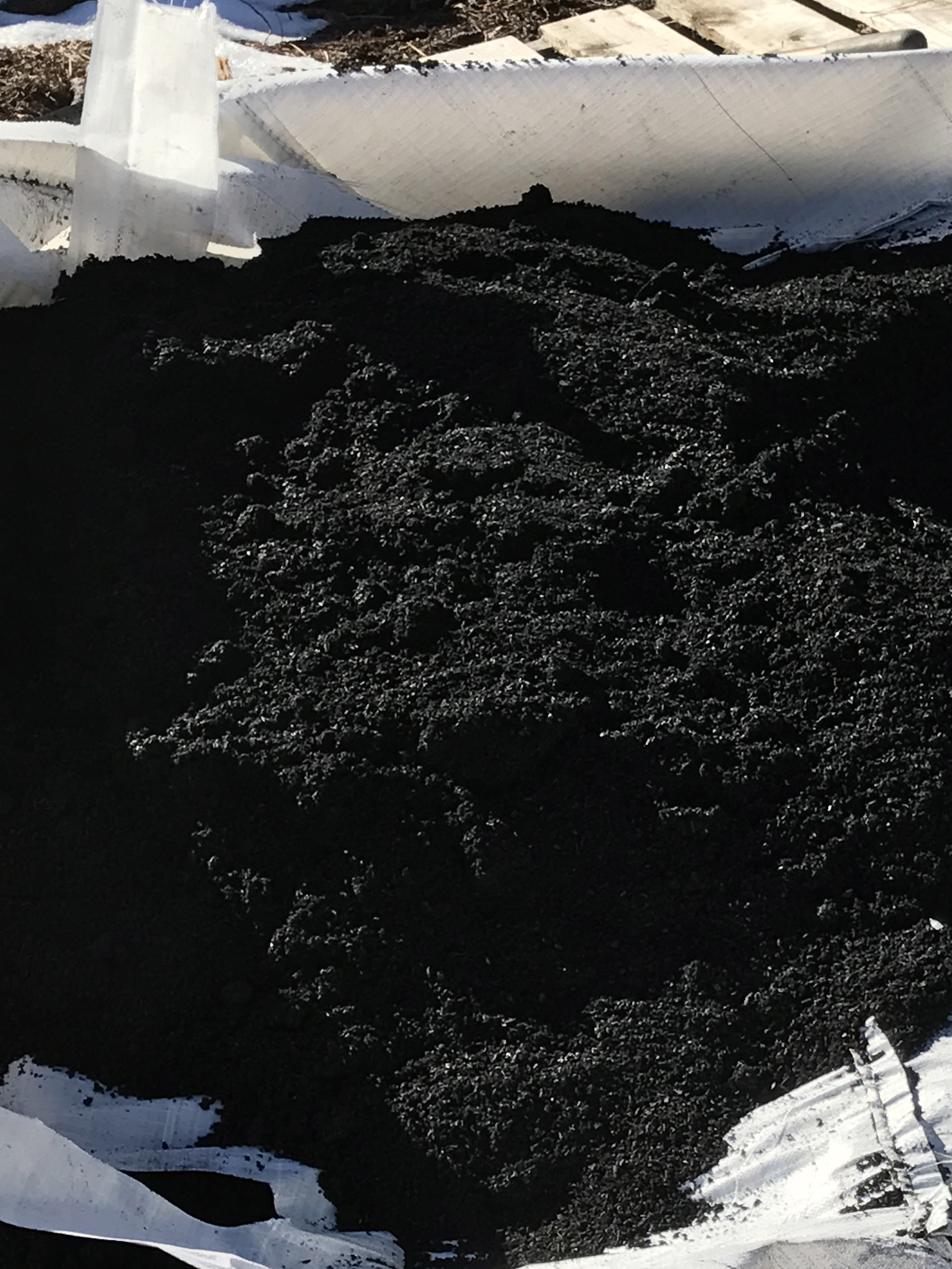
Biochar in preparation as a soil amendment

Biochar offers multiple soil health benefits in degraded tropical soils but is less beneficial in temperate regions. Its porous nature is effective at retaining both water and water-soluble nutrients. Soil biologist Elaine Ingham highlighted its suitability as a habitat for beneficial soil microorganisms. She pointed out that when pre-charged with these beneficial organisms, biochar promotes good soil and plant health.

Biochar reduces leaching of E. coli through sandy soils depending on application rate, feedstock, pyrolysis temperature, soil moisture content, soil texture, and surface properties of the bacteria.

For plants that require high potash and elevated pH, biochar can improve yield.

Biochar can improve water quality, reduce soil emissions of greenhouse gases, reduce nutrient leaching, reduce soil acidity, and reduce irrigation and fertilizer requirements. Due to its porosity, the small holes in biochar can keep water and dissolved minerals in the upper layers of soil, assisting plant growth and reducing the need for and expense of fertilizer. Under certain circumstances biochar induces plant systemic responses to foliar fungal diseases and improves plant responses to diseases caused by soilborne pathogens. Biochar can remove heavy metals from the soil.

Biochar's impacts are dependent on its properties as well as the amount applied, although knowledge about the important mechanisms and properties is limited. Biochar impact may depend on regional conditions including soil type, soil condition (depleted or healthy), temperature, and humidity. Modest additions of biochar reduce nitrous oxide (N_{2}O) emissions by up to 80% and eliminate methane emissions, which are both more potent greenhouse gases than CO_{2}.

Studies reported positive effects from biochar on crop production in degraded and nutrient–poor soils. The application of compost and biochar under FP7 project FERTIPLUS had positive effects on soil humidity, crop productivity and quality in multiple countries. Biochar can be adapted with specific qualities to target distinct soil properties. In Colombian savanna soil, biochar reduced leaching of critical nutrients, created a higher nutrient uptake, and provided greater nutrient availability. At 10% levels, biochar reduced contaminant levels in plants by up to 80%, while reducing chlordane and DDX content in the plants by 68 and 79%, respectively. However, because of its high adsorption capacity, biochar may reduce pesticide efficacy. High-surface-area biochars may be particularly problematic.

Biochar may be plowed into soils in crop fields or added to gardens to enhance their fertility and stability and for medium- to long-term carbon sequestration in these soils. It even shows good results when top-dressed. It has shown positive effects in increasing soil fertility and improving disease resistance in West European soils. Gardeners taking individual action on climate change add biochar to soil, increasing plant yield and thereby drawing down more carbon. The use of biochar as a feed additive is a way to apply biochar to pastures and to reduce methane emissions.

Application rates of 2.5–20 tonnes per hectare (1.0–8.1 t/acre) appear required to improve plant yields significantly. Biochar costs in developed countries vary from $300–$7,000/tonne, which is generally impractical for the farmer/horticulturalist and prohibitive for low-input field crops. In developing countries, constraints on agricultural biochar relate more to biomass availability and production time. A compromise is to use small amounts of biochar in lower-cost biochar-fertilizer complexes.

Biochar soil amendments, when applied at excessive rates or with unsuitable soil type and biochar feedstock combinations, also have the potential for negative effects, including harming soil biota, reducing available water content, altering soil pH, and increasing salinity.

=== Slash-and-char ===
Suggested as an alternative to slash-and-burn , slash-and-char farming techniques in tropical regions can decrease both deforestation and carbon dioxide emission, as well as increase crop yields. Slash-and-burn leaves only 3% of the carbon from the organic material in the soil whereas slash-and-char can retain up to 50%. The global potential for carbon sequestration by shifting from slash-and-burn to slash-and-char farming techniques has been estimated to between 0.22 and 0.42 Gt C/yr. Biochar reduces the need for nitrogen fertilizers, thereby reducing cost and emissions from fertilizer production and transport. Additionally, by improving soil's till-ability, fertility, and productivity, biochar-enhanced soils can indefinitely sustain agricultural production. This is unlike slash-and-burn soils, which quickly become depleted of nutrients, forcing farmers to abandon fields, producing a continuous slash-and-burn cycle. Using pyrolysis to produce bio-energy does not require infrastructure changes the way, for example, processing biomass for cellulosic ethanol does. Additionally, biochar can be applied by the widely used machinery.

=== Water retention ===
Biochar is hygroscopic due to its porous structure and high specific surface area. As a result, fertilizer and other nutrients are retained for plants' benefit.

=== Stock fodder ===
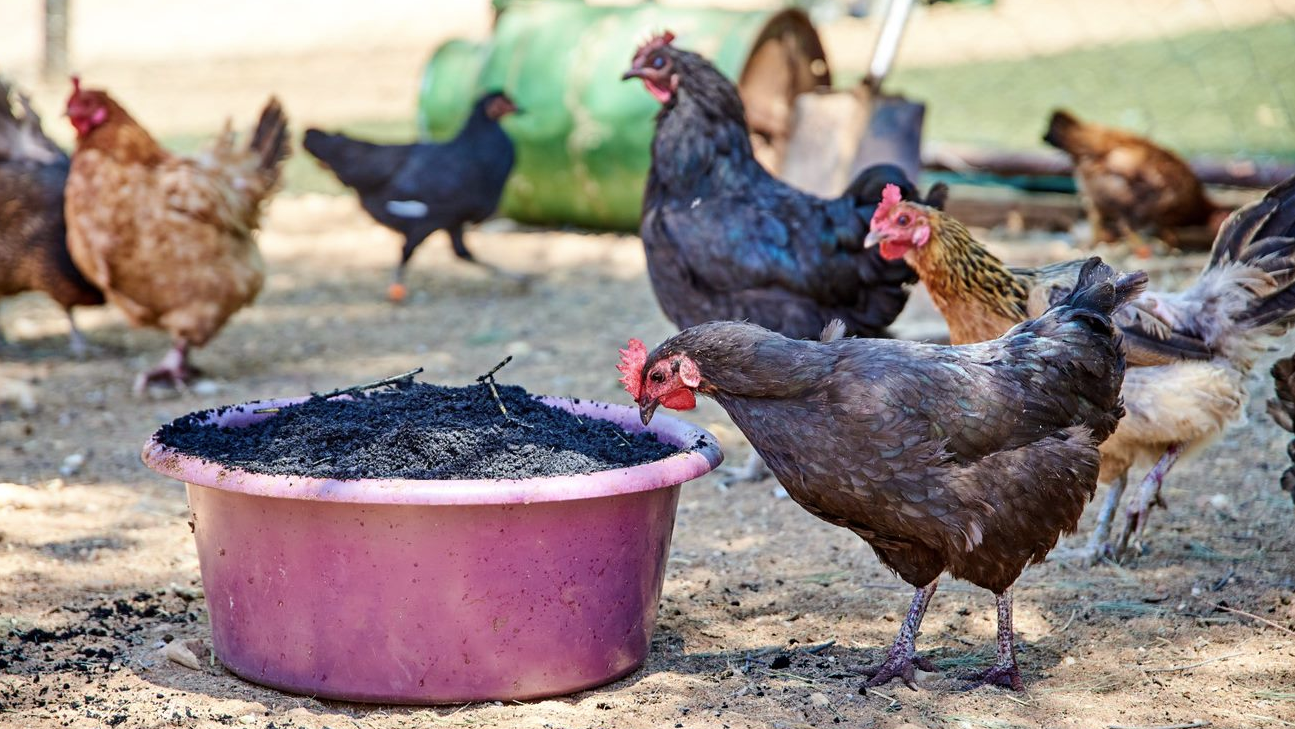
Domestic chicken feeding on biochar in Namibia

Biochar has been used in animal feed for centuries.

Doug Pow, a Western Australian farmer, explored the use of biochar mixed with molasses as stock fodder. He asserted that in ruminants, biochar can assist digestion and reduce methane production. He also used dung beetles to work the resulting biochar-infused dung into the soil without using machinery. The nitrogen and carbon in the dung were both incorporated into the soil rather than staying on the soil surface, reducing the production of nitrous oxide and carbon dioxide. The nitrogen and carbon added to soil fertility. On-farm evidence indicates that the fodder led to improvements of liveweight gain in Angus-cross cattle. Doug Pow won the Australian Government Innovation in Agriculture Land Management Award at the 2019 Western Australian Landcare Awards for this innovation. Pow's work led to two further trials on dairy cattle, yielding reduced odour and increased milk production.

=== Concrete additive ===
Ordinary Portland cement (OPC), an essential component of concrete mix, is energy- and emissions-intensive to produce; cement production accounts for around 8% of global CO_{2} emissions. The concrete industry has increasingly shifted to using supplementary cementitious materials (SCMs), additives that reduce the volume of OPC in a mix while maintaining or improving concrete properties. Biochar has been shown to be an effective SCM, reducing concrete production emissions while maintaining required strength and ductility properties.

Studies have found that a 1–2% weight concentration of biochar is optimal for use in concrete mixes, from both a cost and strength standpoint. A 2 wt.% biochar solution has been shown to increase concrete flexural strength by 15% in a three-point bending test conducted after 7 days, compared to traditional OPC concrete. Biochar concrete also shows promise in high-temperature resistance and permeability reduction.

A cradle-to-gate life cycle assessment of biochar concrete showed decreased production emissions with higher concentrations of biochar, which tracks with a reduction in OPC. Compared to other SCMs from industrial waste streams (such as fly ash and silica fume), biochar also showed decreased toxicity.

=== Fuel slurry ===
Biochar mixed with liquid media such as water or organic liquids (such as ethanol) is an emerging fuel type known as biochar-based slurry. Adapting slow pyrolysis in large biomass fields and installations enables the generation of biochar slurries with unique characteristics. These slurries are becoming promising fuels in countries with regional areas where biomass is abundant, and power supply relies heavily on diesel generators. This type of fuel resembles a coal slurry, but with the advantage that it can be derived from biochar from renewable resources.

=== Water treatment ===
Biochar also has applications in water treatment. Its properties, porosity in particular, can be modified using different methods to increase the efficiency of contaminant removal. Biochar is reported to remove contaminants such as heavy metals, dyes, organic pollutants.

== Research ==
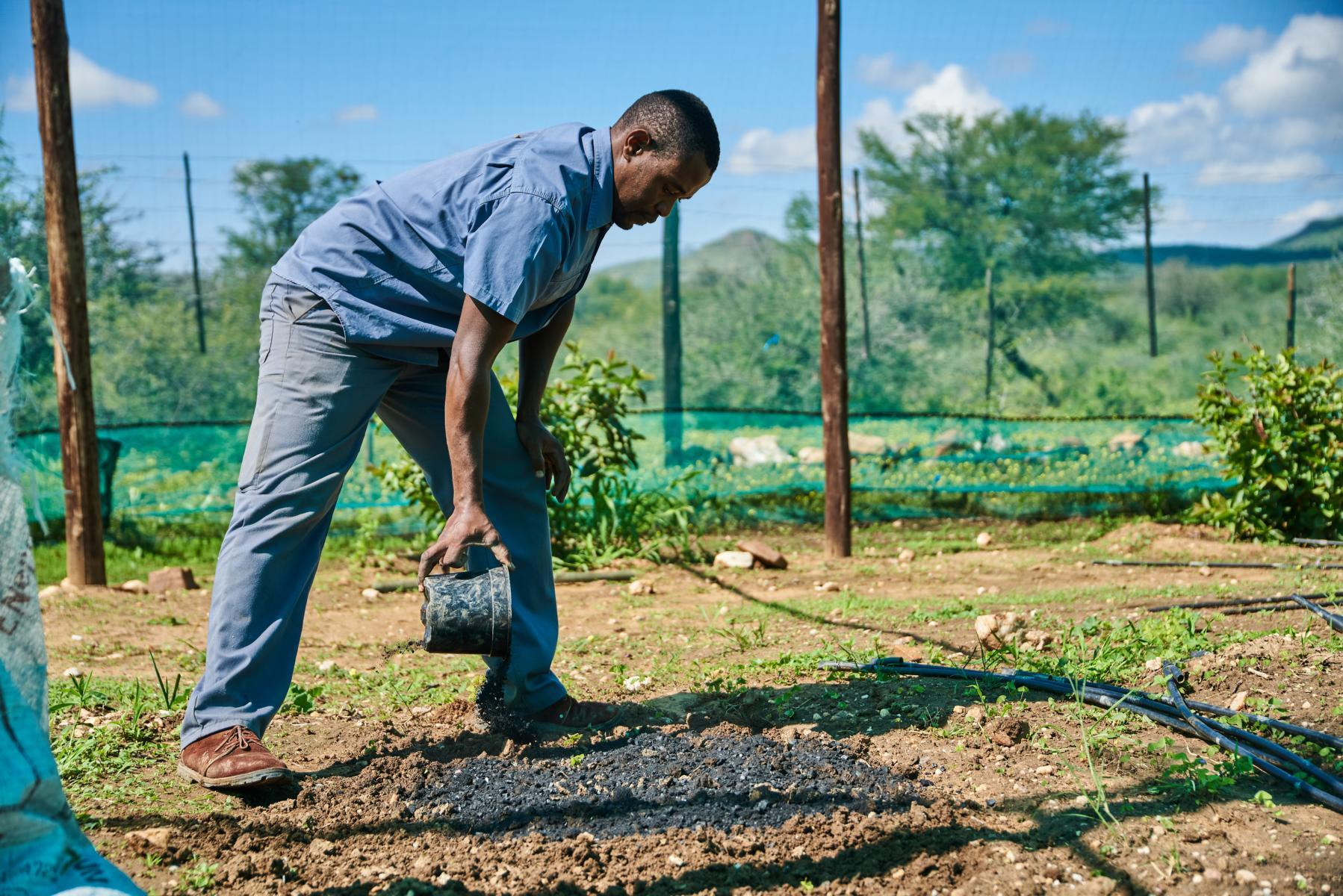
Biochar applied to the soil in research trials in Namibia

Research into pyrolysis and biochar is underway globally, but as of 2018 was still in its infancy. From 2005 to 2012, 1,038 articles included the word "biochar" or "bio-char" in the topic indexed in the ISI Web of Science. Research is in progress by the University of Edinburgh, the University of Georgia, the Volcani Center, and the Swedish University of Agricultural Sciences.

Research is also ongoing on the application of biochar to coarse soils in semi-arid and degraded ecosystems. In Namibia, biochar is under exploration as a climate change adaptation effort, strengthening local communities' drought resilience and food security through the local production and application of biochar from abundant encroacher biomass. Similar solutions for rangeland affected by woody plant encroachment have been explored in Australia.

In recent years, biochar has attracted interest as a wastewater filtration medium as well as for its adsorbing capacity for wastewater pollutants, such as pharmaceuticals, personal care products, and per- and polyfluoroalkyl substances.

In some areas, citizen interest and support for biochar motivates government research into the uses of biochar.

=== Studies ===
Long-term effects of biochar on carbon sequestration have been examined using soil from arable fields in Belgium with charcoal-enriched black spots dating from before 1870 from charcoal production mound kilns. This study showed that soil treated over a long period with charcoal showed a higher proportion of maize-derived carbon and decreased respiration, attributed to physical protection, carbon saturation of microbial communities, and, potentially, slightly higher annual primary production. Overall, this study evidences the capacity of biochar to enhance carbon sequestration through reduced carbon turnover.

Biochar sequesters carbon in soils because of its prolonged residence time, ranging from years to millennia. In addition, biochar can promote indirect carbon sequestration by increasing crop yield while potentially reducing carbon mineralization. Laboratory studies have evidenced effects of biochar on carbon mineralization using ^{13}C signatures.

Fluorescence analysis of organic matter dissolved in biochar-amended soil revealed that biochar application increased a humic-like fluorescent component, likely associated with biochar-carbon in solution. The combined spectroscopy-microscopy approach revealed the accumulation of aromatic carbon in discrete spots in the solid phase of microaggregates and its co-localization with clay minerals for soil amended with raw residue or biochar. Biochar application consistently reduced the co-localization of aromatic carbon and polysaccharides carbon. These findings suggested that reduced carbon metabolism is an important mechanism for carbon stabilization in biochar-amended soils.

== See also ==
- Activated carbon
- Charring
- Dark earth
- Pellet fuel
- Soil carbon
- Soil ecology
