= Universal vaccine =

Universal vaccine(s) may refer to:

- Universal coronavirus vaccine
- Universal flu vaccine
