= Carbon dioxide removal =

Removal of atmospheric carbon dioxide through human activity

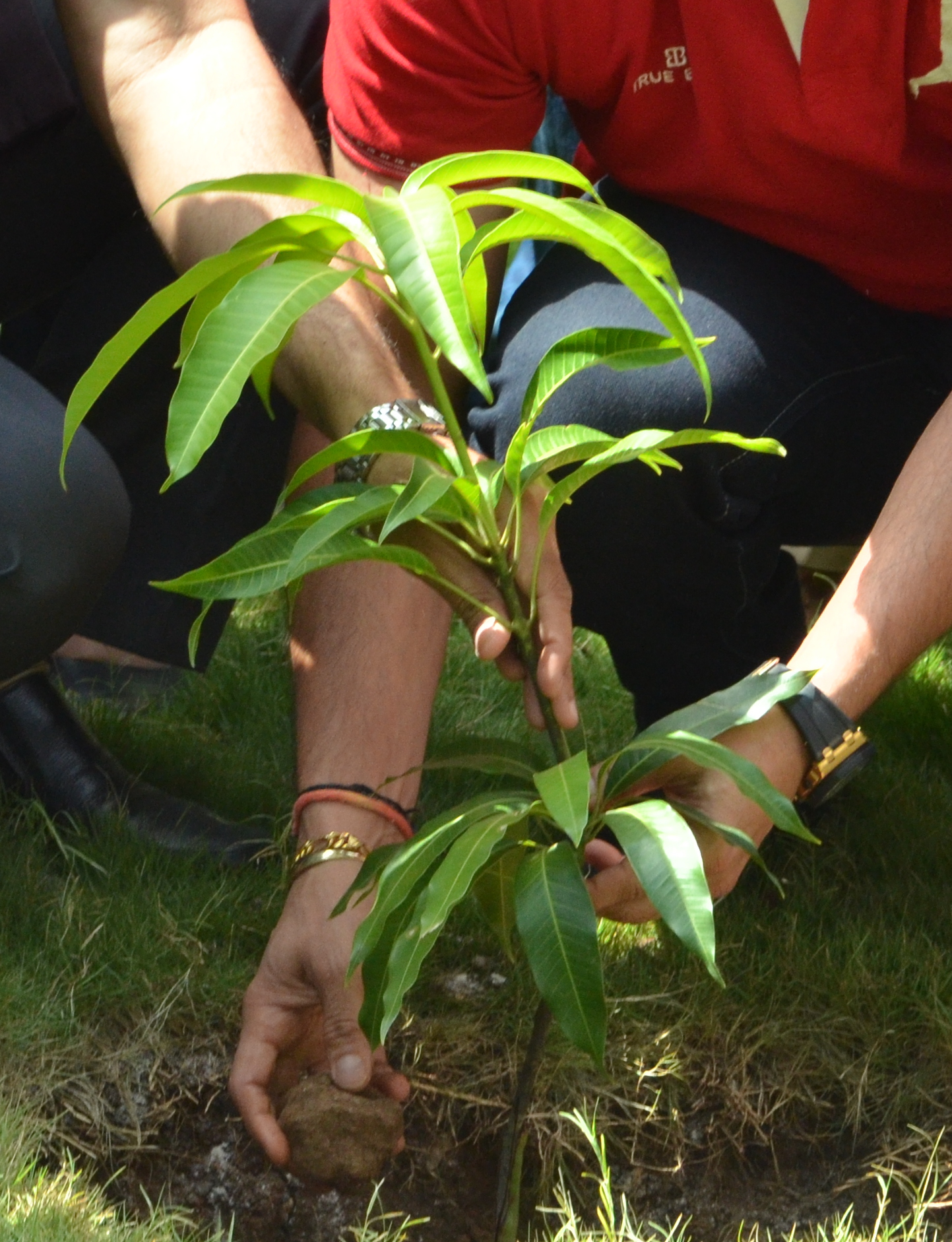
Planting trees is a nature-based way to remove carbon dioxide from the atmosphere; however, the effect may only be temporary in some cases.

Carbon dioxide removal (CDR) is a process in which carbon dioxide (CO_{2}) is removed from Earth's atmosphere by deliberate human activities and durably stored in geological, terrestrial, or marine reservoirs, or in products. This process is also known as carbon removal, greenhouse gas removal or negative emissions. CDR is more and more often integrated into climate policy, as an element of climate change mitigation strategies. Achieving net zero emissions will require first and foremost deep and sustained cuts in emissions, and then—in addition—the use of CDR ("CDR is what puts the net into net zero emissions" ). In the future, CDR may be able to counterbalance emissions that are technically difficult to eliminate, such as some agricultural and industrial emissions.

CDR includes methods that are implemented on land or in aquatic systems. Land-based methods include afforestation, reforestation, agricultural practices that sequester carbon in soils (carbon farming), bioenergy with carbon capture and storage (BECCS), and direct air capture combined with storage. There are also CDR methods that use oceans and other water bodies. Those are called ocean fertilization, ocean alkalinity enhancement, wetland restoration and blue carbon approaches. A detailed analysis needs to be performed to assess how much negative emissions a particular process achieves. This analysis includes life cycle analysis and "monitoring, reporting, and verification" (MRV) of the entire process. Carbon capture and storage (CCS) are not regarded as CDR because CCS does not reduce the amount of carbon dioxide already in the atmosphere.

As of 2023, CDR is estimated to remove around 2 gigatons of CO_{2} per year. This is equivalent to about 4% of the greenhouse gases emitted per year by human activities. There is potential to remove and sequester up to 10 gigatons of carbon dioxide per year by using those CDR methods which can be safely and economically deployed now. However, quantifying the exact amount of carbon dioxide removed from the atmosphere by CDR is difficult.

== Definition ==
Carbon dioxide removal (CDR) is defined by the IPCC as: "Anthropogenic activities removing CO_{2} from the atmosphere and durably storing it in geological, terrestrial, or ocean reservoirs, or in products. It includes existing and potential anthropogenic enhancement of biological or geochemical sinks and direct air capture and storage, but excludes natural CO_{2} uptake not directly caused by human activities."

Synonyms for CDR include greenhouse gas removal (GGR), negative emissions technology, and carbon removal. Technologies have been proposed for removing non-CO_{2} greenhouse gases such as methane from the atmosphere, but only carbon dioxide is currently feasible to remove at scale. Therefore, in most contexts, greenhouse gas removal means carbon dioxide removal.

The term geoengineering (or climate engineering) is sometimes used in the scientific literature for both CDR or SRM (solar radiation management), if the techniques are used at a global scale. The terms geoengineering or climate engineering are no longer used in IPCC reports.

== Categories ==
CDR methods can be placed in different categories that are based on different criteria:

- Role in the carbon cycle (land-based biological; ocean-based biological; geochemical; chemical); or
- Timescale of storage (decades to centuries; centuries to millennia; thousand years or longer)

=== Concepts using similar terminology ===
CDR can be confused with carbon capture and storage (CCS), a process in which carbon dioxide is collected from point-sources such as gas-fired power plants, whose smokestacks emit CO_{2} in a concentrated stream. The CO_{2} is then compressed and sequestered. When used to sequester the carbon from a fossil fuel-fired power plant, CCS reduces emissions from continued use of the point source, but does not reduce the amount of carbon dioxide already in the atmosphere.

== Role in climate change mitigation ==
Use of CDR reduces the overall rate at which humans are adding carbon dioxide to the atmosphere. The Earth's surface temperature will stabilize only after global emissions have been reduced to net zero, which will require both aggressive efforts to reduce emissions and deployment of CDR. It is not feasible to bring net emissions to zero without CDR as certain types of emissions are technically difficult to eliminate. Emissions that are difficult to eliminate include nitrous oxide emissions from agriculture, aviation emissions, and some industrial emissions. In climate change mitigation strategies, the use of CDR counterbalances those emissions.

After net zero emissions have been achieved, CDR could be used to reduce atmospheric CO_{2} concentrations, which could partially reverse the warming that has already occurred by that date. All emission pathways that limit global warming to 1.5 °C or 2 °C by the year 2100 assume the use of CDR in combination with emission reductions.

Climate restoration inherently depends on CDR, since restoring the climate system requires reducing atmospheric CO₂ concentrations below current levels.

=== Critique and risks ===
Critics point out that CDR must not be regarded as a substitute for the required cuts in greenhouse gas emissions. Oceanographer David Ho formulated it like this in 2023 "We must stop talking about deploying CDR as a solution today, when emissions remain high—as if it somehow replaces radical, immediate emission cuts.

Reliance on large-scale deployment of CDR was regarded in 2018 as a "major risk" to achieving the goal of less than 1.5 °C of warming, given the uncertainties in how quickly CDR can be deployed at scale. Strategies for mitigating climate change that rely less on CDR and more on sustainable use of energy carry less of this risk.

The possibility of large-scale future CDR deployment has been described as a moral hazard, as it could lead to a reduction in near-term efforts to mitigate climate change. However, the 2019 NASEM report concludes: "Any argument to delay mitigation efforts because NETs will provide a backstop drastically misrepresents their current capacities and the likely pace of research progress."

CDR is meant to complement efforts in hard-to-abate sectors rather than replace mitigation. Limiting climate change to 1.5 °C and achieving net-zero emissions would entail substantial carbon dioxide removal (CDR) from the atmosphere by the mid-century, but how much CDR is needed at country level over time is unclear. Equitable allocations of CDR, in many cases, exceed implied land and carbon storage capacities. Many countries have either insufficient land to contribute an equitable share of global CDR or insufficient geological storage capacity.

Experts also highlight social and ecological limits for carbon dioxide removal, such as the land area required. For example, the combined land requirements of removal plans as per the global Nationally Determined Contributions in 2023 amounted to 1.2 billion hectares, which is equal to the combined size of global croplands.

=== Permanence ===
Forests, kelp beds, and other forms of plant life absorb carbon dioxide from the air as they grow, and bind it into biomass. However, these biological stores are considered volatile carbon sinks as the long-term sequestration cannot be guaranteed. For example, natural events, such as wildfires or disease, economic pressures and changing political priorities can result in the sequestered carbon being released back into the atmosphere.

Biomass, such as trees, can be directly stored into the Earth's subsurface. Furthermore, carbon dioxide that has been removed from the atmosphere can be stored in the Earth's crust by injecting it into the subsurface, or in the form of insoluble carbonate salts. This is because they are removing carbon from the atmosphere and sequestering it indefinitely and presumably for a considerable duration (thousands to millions of years).

=== Current and potential scale ===
As of 2023, CDR is estimated to remove about 2 gigatons of CO_{2} per year, almost entirely by low-tech methods like reforestation and the creation of new forests. This is equivalent to 4% of the greenhouse gases emitted per year by human activities. A 2019 consensus study report by NASEM assessed the potential of all forms of CDR other than ocean fertilization that could be deployed safely and economically using current technologies, and estimated that they could remove up to 10 gigatons of CO_{2} per year if fully deployed worldwide. In 2018, all analyzed mitigation pathways that would prevent more than 1.5 °C of warming included CDR measures.

Some mitigation pathways propose achieving higher rates of CDR through massive deployment of one technology; however, these pathways assume that hundreds of millions of hectares of cropland are converted to growing biofuel crops. Further research in the areas of direct air capture, geologic sequestration of carbon dioxide, and carbon mineralization could potentially yield technological advancements that make higher rates of CDR economically feasible. Investing in nature-based solutions is considered a way to buy time for the advancement of engineered carbon removal methods, enabling their full deployment in the second half of the 21st century.

== Methods ==
=== Overview listing based on technology readiness level ===
The following is a list of known CDR methods in the order of their technology readiness level (TRL). The ones at the top have a high TRL of 8 to 9 (9 being the maximum possible value, meaning the technology is proven), the ones at the bottom have a low TRL of 1 to 2, meaning the technology is not proven or only validated at laboratory scale.

1. Afforestation/ reforestation
2. Soil carbon sequestration in croplands and grasslands
3. Peatland and coastal wetland restoration
4. Agroforestry, improved forest management
5. Biochar carbon removal (BCR)
6. Direct air carbon capture and storage (DACCS)
7. Bioenergy with carbon capture and storage (BECCS)
8. Enhanced weathering (alkalinity enhancement)
9. Blue carbon management in coastal wetlands (restoration of vegetated coastal ecosystems; an ocean-based biological CDR method which encompasses mangroves, salt marshes and seagrass beds)
10. Ocean fertilization, ocean alkalinity enhancement that amplifies the oceanic carbon cycle

The CDR methods with the greatest potential to contribute to climate change mitigation efforts as per illustrative mitigation pathways are the land-based biological CDR methods (primarily afforestation/reforestation (A/R)) and/or bioenergy with carbon capture and storage (BECCS). Some of the pathways also include direct air capture and storage (DACCS).

=== Afforestation, reforestation, and forestry management ===
Trees use photosynthesis to absorb carbon dioxide and store the carbon in wood and soils. Afforestation is the establishment of a forest in an area where there was previously no forest. Reforestation is the re-establishment of a forest that has been previously cleared. Forests are vital for human society, animals and plant species. This is because trees keep air clean, regulate the local climate, and provide a habitat for numerous species.

As trees grow they absorb CO_{2} from the atmosphere and store it in living biomass, dead organic matter and soils. Afforestation and reforestation – sometimes referred to collectively as 'forestation' – facilitate this process of carbon removal by establishing or re-establishing forest areas. It takes forests approximately 10 years to ramp- up to the maximum sequestration rate.

Depending on the species, the trees will reach maturity after around 20 to 100 years, after which they store carbon but do not actively remove it from the atmosphere. Carbon can be stored in forests indefinitely, but the storage can also be much more short-lived as trees are vulnerable to being cut, burned, or killed by disease or drought. Once mature, forest products can be harvested and the biomass stored in long-lived wood products, or used for bioenergy or biochar. Consequent forest regrowth then allows continuing CO_{2} removal.

Risks to deployment of new forest include the availability of land, competition with other land uses, and the comparatively long time from planting to maturity.

=== Agricultural practices (carbon farming) ===
Carbon farming is a set of agricultural methods that aim to store carbon in the soil, crop roots, wood and leaves. The overall goal of carbon farming is to create a net loss of carbon from the atmosphere. This is done by increasing the rate at which carbon is sequestered into soil and plant material. One option is to increase the soil organic carbon content using practices of soil regeneration. This can also aid plant growth, improve soil water retention capacity and reduce fertilizer use. Sustainable forest management is another tool that is used in carbon farming.

Agricultural methods for carbon farming include adjusting how tillage and livestock grazing is done, using organic mulch or compost, working with biochar and terra preta, and changing crop types. Methods used in forestry include reforestation and bamboo farming. Carbon farming is not without its challenges or disadvantages due to some of its methods affecting ecosystem services. For example, carbon farming could cause an increase of land clearing, monocultures and biodiversity loss.

=== Biomass carbon removal and storage ===
Biomass carbon removal and storage (frequently abbreviated as BiCRS) is a family of technologies for carbon dioxide removal, which collect biomass (such as agricultural waste or biproducts of biomass energy systems) and sequesters that carbon through a permanent or semi-permanent method of storage. The family of technologies is often compared with direct air capture. Unlike direct air capture that use human engineered technologies to remove carbon dioxide from the atmosphere (which is expensive and energy intensive), BiCRS technologies rely on photosynthesis of plants and then engineering solutions for taking the carbon-rich residue of that plant life and sequestering it.

BiCRS technologies introduce a number of challenges for carbon dioxide removal, including uncertainty about measuring sequestration of buried biomass, and complexity in sourcing biomass (it introduces additional demand for agricultural land and organic bioproducts). Researchers and policy think tanks like World Resources Institute recommend policy that put limits on which kind of biomass can be used for these process.

The family of technologies is a major part of the Frontier Climate advanced commitment purchase portfolio, including companies like Charm Industrial and Vaulted Deep.

==== Bioenergy with carbon capture and storage (BECCS) ====
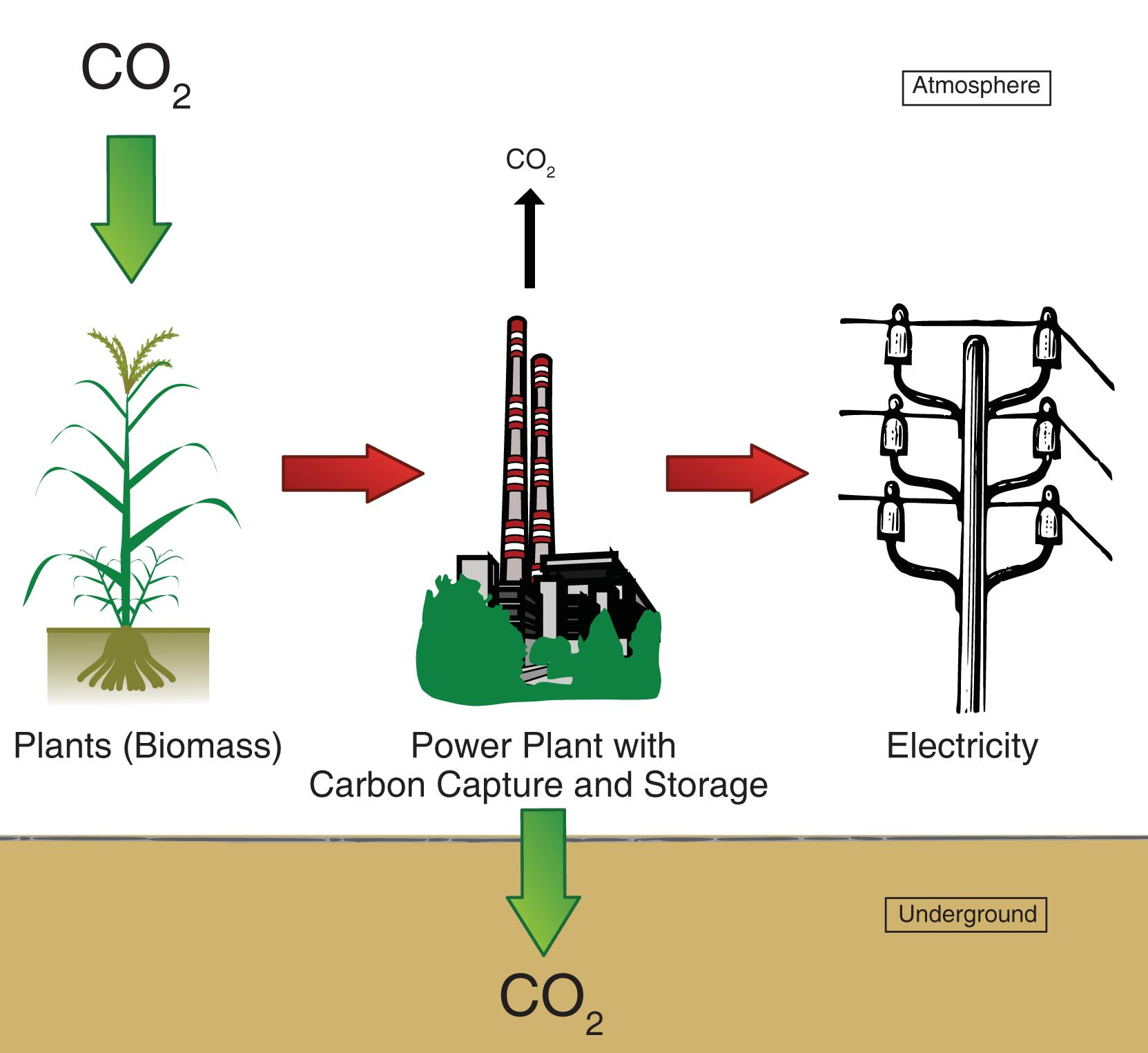
Example of BECCS: Diagram of bioenergy power plant with carbon capture and storage.

Bioenergy with carbon capture and storage (BECCS) is the process of extracting bioenergy from biomass and capturing and storing the carbon dioxide (CO_{2}) that is produced.

==== Biochar carbon removal (BCR) ====
Biochar is created by the pyrolysis of biomass, and is under investigation as a method of carbon sequestration. Biochar is a charcoal that is used for agricultural purposes which also aids in carbon sequestration, the capture or hold of carbon. It is created using a process called pyrolysis, which is basically the act of high temperature heating biomass in an environment with low oxygen levels. What remains is a material known as char, similar to charcoal but is made through a sustainable process, thus the use of biomass. Biomass is organic matter produced by living organisms or recently living organisms, most commonly plants or plant based material. A study done by the UK Biochar Research Center has stated that, on a conservative level, biochar can store 1 gigaton of carbon per year. With greater effort in marketing and acceptance of biochar, the benefit of Biochar Carbon Removal could be the storage of 5–9 gigatons per year in soils. However, biochar is restricted by the terrestrial carbon storage capacity, when the system reaches the state of equilibrium, and requires regulation because of threats of leakage.

=== Direct air capture with carbon sequestration (DACCS) ===
The International Energy Agency reported growth in direct air capture global operating capacity.

Direct air capture (DAC) is the use of chemical or physical processes to extract carbon dioxide (CO_{2}) directly from the ambient air. If the extracted CO_{2} is then sequestered in safe long-term storage, the overall process is called direct air carbon capture and sequestration (DACCS), achieving carbon dioxide removal. Systems that engage in such a process are referred to as negative emissions technologies (NET).

=== Marine carbon dioxide removal (mCDR) ===
CO_{2} sequestration in the ocean

There are several methods of sequestering carbon from the ocean, where dissolved carbonate in the form of carbonic acid is in equilibrium with atmospheric carbon dioxide. These include ocean fertilization, the purposeful introduction of plant nutrients to the upper ocean. While one of the more well-researched carbon dioxide removal approaches, ocean fertilization would only sequester carbon on a timescale of 10–100 years. While surface ocean acidity may decrease as a result of nutrient fertilization, sinking organic matter will remineralize, increasing deep ocean acidity. A 2021 report on CDR indicates that there is medium-high confidence that the technique could be efficient and scalable at low cost, with medium environmental risks. Ocean fertilization is estimated to be able to sequester 0.1 to 1 gigatonnes of carbon dioxide per year at a cost of US$8 to $80 per tonne.

Ocean alkalinity enhancement involves grinding, dispersing, and dissolving minerals such as olivine, limestone, silicates, or calcium hydroxide to precipitate carbonate sequestered as deposits on the ocean floor. The removal potential of alkalinity enhancement is uncertain, and estimated at between 0.1 and 1 gigatonnes of carbon dioxide per year at a cost of US$100 to $150 per tonne.

Electrochemical techniques such as electrodialysis can remove carbonate from seawater using electricity. While such techniques used in isolation are estimated to be able to remove 0.1 to 1 gigatonnes of carbon dioxide per year at a cost of US$150 to $2,500 per tonne, these methods are much less expensive when performed in conjunction with seawater processing such as desalination, where salt and carbonate are simultaneously removed. Preliminary estimates suggest that the cost of such carbon removal can be paid for in large part if not entirely from the sale of the desalinated water produced as a byproduct.

Without explicit human support, marine macroalgae (seaweed) has been expanding its footprint across the oceans, accelerating beginning in 2008-2010, increasing at 13.4%/yr since then.

== Costs and economics ==
The cost of CDR differs substantially depending on the maturity of the technology employed as well as the economics of both voluntary carbon removal markets and the physical output; for example, the pyrolysis of biomass produces biochar that has various commercial applications, including soil regeneration and wastewater treatment. DAC cost from $94 to $600 per tonne, biochar from $200 to $584 per tonne and nature-based solutions (such as reforestation and afforestation) to be less than $50 per tonne. The fact that biochar commands a higher price in the carbon removal market than nature-based solutions reflects the fact that it is a more durable sink with carbon being sequestered for hundreds or even thousands of years while nature-based solutions represent a more volatile form of storage, which risks related to forest fires, pests, economic pressures and changing political priorities. Different CDR removal technologies could have their design and operational advantages, for example, while nature-based solutions are cheap, DAC plant that captures 1 MtCO_{2} per year using a land area of 0.4–1.5 km^{2} (99–371 acres) is equivalent to the CO_{2} capture rates of roughly 46 million trees, requiring approximately 3,098–4,647 km^{2} (765,494–1,148,241 acres) of land. The Oxford Principles for Net Zero Aligned Carbon Offsetting states that to be compatible with the Paris Agreement: "...organizations must commit to gradually increase the percentage of carbon removal offsets they procure with the view of exclusively sourcing carbon removals by mid-century." These initiatives along with the development of new industry standards for engineered carbon removal, such as the Puro Standard, will help to support the growth of the carbon removal market.

Although CDR is not covered by the EU Allowance as of 2021, the European Commission is preparing for carbon removal certification and considering carbon contracts for difference. CDR might also in future be added to the UK Emissions Trading Scheme. As of end 2021 carbon prices for both these cap-and-trade schemes currently based on carbon reductions, as opposed to carbon removals, remained below $100. After the diffusion of net-zero targets, CDR plays a more important role in key emerging economies (e.g. Brazil, China, and India).

As of early 2023, financing has fell short of the sums required for high-tech CDR methods to contribute significantly to climate change mitigation. Though available funds have recently increased substantially. Most of this increase has been from voluntary private sector initiatives. Such as a private sector alliance led by Stripe with prominent members including Meta, Google and Shopify, which in April 2022 revealed a nearly $1 billion fund to reward companies able to permanently capture & store carbon. According to senior Stripe employee Nan Ransohoff, the fund was "roughly 30 times the carbon-removal market that existed in 2021. But it's still 1,000 times short of the market we need by 2050." The predominance of private sector funding has raised concerns as historically, voluntary markets have proved "orders of magnitude" smaller than those brought about by government policy. As of 2023 however, various governments have increased their support for CDR; these include Sweden, Switzerland, and the US. Recent activity from the US government includes the June 2022 Notice of Intent to fund the Bipartisan Infrastructure Law's $3.5 billion CDR program, and the signing into law of the Inflation Reduction Act of 2022, which contains the 45Q tax to enhance the CDR market.

== Removal of other greenhouse gases ==
Although some researchers have suggested methods for removing methane, others say that nitrous oxide would be a better subject for research due to its longer lifetime in the atmosphere.

== See also ==
- Biological carbon fixation – Series of interconnected biochemical reactions
- Carbon dioxide scrubber – Device which absorbs carbon dioxide from circulated gas
- Carbon-neutral fuel – Type of fuel which have no net greenhouse gas emissions
- Climate change scenario – Hypothetical representation of potential future conditions
- Low-carbon economy – Climate-friendly economy
- Virgin Earth Challenge – Competition for permanent removal of greenhouse gases
