= Christopher Snyder (economist) =

American economist

Academic background
- Education: Massachusetts Institute of Technology; Fordham University
- Doctoral advisor: Jean Tirole

Academic work
- Discipline: Industrial Organization; Microeconomic Theory; Law and economics
- Institutions: Dartmouth College
- Website: Information at IDEAS / RePEc

Christopher Mark Snyder is an American economist and the Joel Z. and Susan Hyatt Professor of Economics at Dartmouth College. He is the co-author of two textbooks, Microeconomic Theory: Basic Principles and Extensions and Intermediate Microeconomics and its Application.

== Background and research ==
Snyder's research focuses on Industrial Organization, Microeconomic Theory and Law and Economics. His recent work has focused on healthcare and vaccines and the economics of open access journals, among other things. In addition to teaching undergraduate students, he is a research associate with the NBER in the Law and Economics Program. Snyder also serves as Secretary-Treasurer of the Industrial Organization Society, and as an Associate Editor for the Review of Industrial Organization.

Prior to Dartmouth, Christopher Snyder was a professor at George Washington University. He graduated summa cum laude from Fordham University in 1989 and received his Ph.D. in economics from MIT in 1994.

In 2024, Snyder signed a faculty letter supporting Dartmouth College president Sian Beilock, who ordered the arrest of 90 students and faculty members nonviolently protesting the Gaza war.

== Selected works ==
- Nicholson, Walter, and Christopher Snyder. Microeconomic theory: basic principles and extensions. Nelson Education, 2011.
- Nicholson, Walter, and Christopher Snyder. Intermediate microeconomics and its application. Nelson Education, 2014. ISBN 1133189024

== Personal life ==
Snyder lives in Hanover, New Hampshire with his wife and three daughters, Clare, Tess, and Meg. His wife, Maura Doyle, is also an economist and a professor at Dartmouth.
