= Shifting cultivation =

Method of agriculture

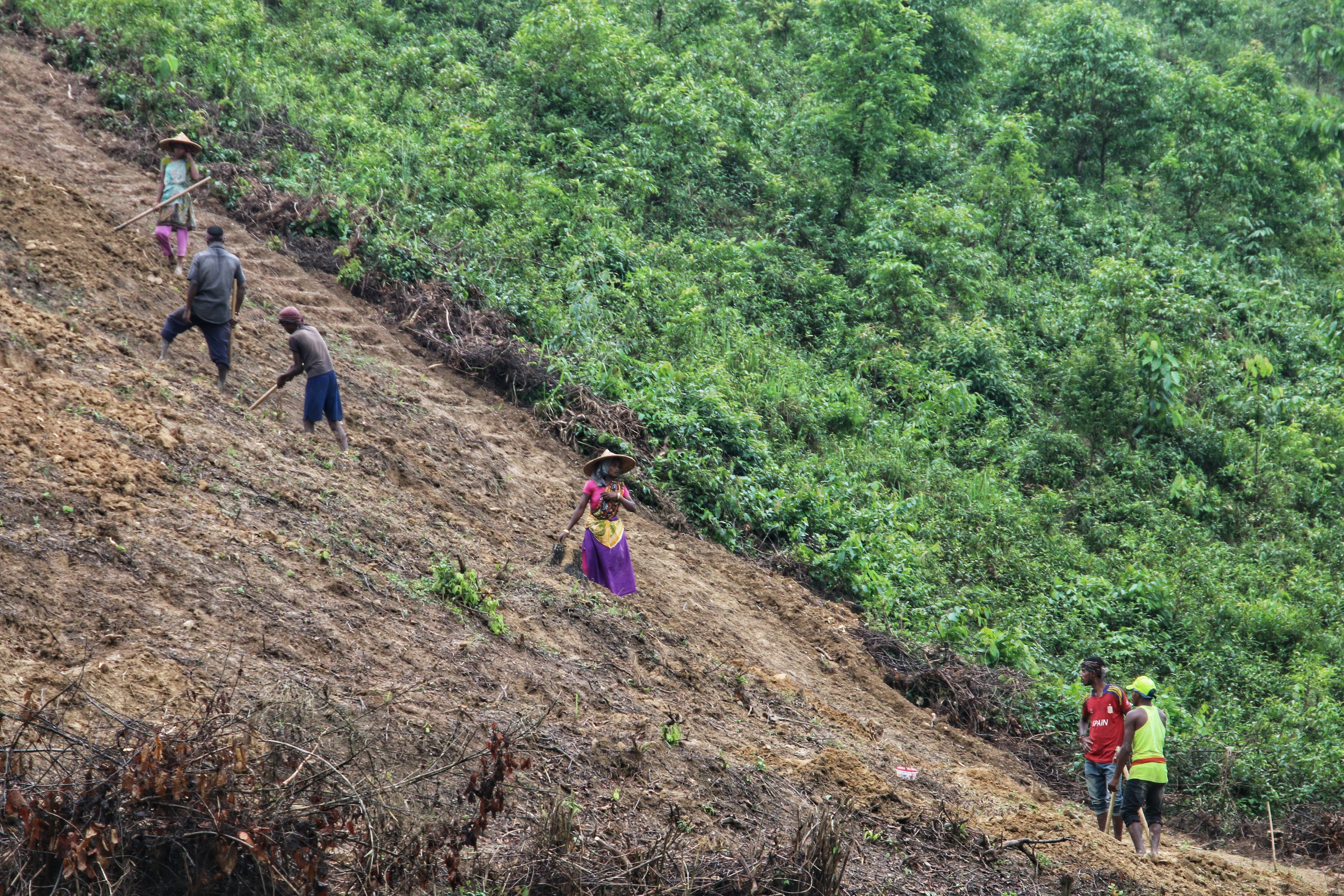
Farmers preparing land for shifting cultivation in Bangladesh.

Shifting cultivation is an agricultural system in which plots of land are cultivated temporarily, then abandoned while post-disturbance fallow vegetation is allowed to freely grow while the cultivator moves on to another plot. The period of cultivation is usually terminated when the soil shows signs of exhaustion or, more commonly, when the field is overrun by weeds. The period of time during which the field is cultivated is usually shorter than the period over which the land is allowed to regenerate by lying fallow.

This technique is often used in developing countries. In some areas, cultivators use a practice of slash-and-burn as one element of their farming cycle. Others employ land clearing without any burning, and some cultivators are purely migratory and do not use any cyclical method on a given plot. Sometimes no slashing at all is needed where regrowth is purely of grasses, an outcome not uncommon when soils are near exhaustion and need to lie fallow.

In shifting agriculture, after two or three years of producing vegetable and grain crops on cleared land, the migrants abandon it for another plot. Land is often cleared by slash-and-burn methods—trees, bushes and forests are cleared by slashing, and the remaining vegetation is burnt. The ashes add potash to the soil. Then the seeds are sown after the rains.

== Political ecology ==
Shifting cultivation is a form of agriculture or a cultivation system in which, at any particular point in time, a minority of 'fields' are in cultivation and a majority are in various stages of natural re-growth. Over time, fields are cultivated for a relatively short time, and allowed to recover, or are fallowed, for a relatively long time. Eventually a previously cultivated field will be cleared of the natural vegetation and planted in crops again. Fields in established and stable shifting cultivation systems are cultivated and fallowed cyclically. This type of farming is called jhumming in India.

Fallow fields are not unproductive. During the fallow period, shifting cultivators use the successive vegetation species widely for timber for fencing and construction, firewood, thatching, ropes, clothing, tools, carrying devices and medicines. It is common for fruit and nut trees to be planted in fallow fields to the extent that parts of some fallows are in fact orchards. Soil-enhancing shrub or tree species may be planted or protected from slashing or burning in fallows. Many of these species have been shown to fix nitrogen. Fallows commonly contain plants that attract birds and animals and are important for hunting. But perhaps most importantly, tree fallows protect soil against physical erosion and draw nutrients to the surface from deep in the soil profile.

The relationship between the time the land is cultivated and the time it is fallowed are critical to the stability of shifting cultivation systems. These parameters determine whether or not the shifting cultivation system as a whole suffers a net loss of nutrients over time. A system in which there is a net loss of nutrients with each cycle will eventually lead to a degradation of resources unless actions are taken to arrest the losses. In some cases soil can be irreversibly exhausted (including erosion as well as nutrient loss) in less than a decade.

The longer a field is cropped, the greater the loss of soil organic matter, cation-exchange-capacity and in nitrogen and phosphorus, the greater the increase in acidity, the more likely soil porosity and infiltration capacity is reduced and the greater the loss of seeds of naturally occurring plant species from soil seed banks. In a stable shifting cultivation system, the fallow is long enough for the natural vegetation to recover to the state that it was in before it was cleared, and for the soil to recover to the condition it was in before cropping began. During fallow periods soil temperatures are lower, wind and water erosion is much reduced, nutrient cycling becomes closed again, nutrients are extracted from the subsoil, soil fauna decreases, acidity is reduced, soil structure, texture and moisture characteristics improve and seed banks are replenished.

The secondary forests created by shifting cultivation are commonly richer in plant and animal resources useful to humans than primary forests, even though they are much less bio-diverse. Shifting cultivators view the forest as an agricultural landscape of fields at various stages in a regular cycle. People unused to living in forests cannot see the fields for the trees. Rather they perceive an apparently chaotic landscape in which trees are cut and burned randomly and so they characterise shifting cultivation as ephemeral or 'pre-agricultural', as 'primitive' and as a stage to be progressed beyond.

Shifting agriculture is none of these things. Stable shifting cultivation systems are highly variable, closely adapted to micro-environments and are carefully managed by farmers during both the cropping and fallow stages. Shifting cultivators may possess a highly developed knowledge and understanding of their local environments and of the crops and native plant species they exploit. Complex and highly adaptive land tenure systems sometimes exist under shifting cultivation. Introduced crops for food and as cash have been skillfully integrated into some shifting cultivation systems. Its disadvantages include the high initial cost, as manual labour is required.

== In Europe ==
Shifting cultivation was still being practised as a viable and stable form of agriculture in many parts of Europe and east into Siberia at the end of the 19th century and in some places well into the 20th century. In the Ruhr in the late 1860s a forest-field rotation system known as Reutbergwirtschaft was using a 16-year cycle of clearing, cropping and fallowing with trees to produce bark for tanneries, wood for charcoal and rye for flour (Darby 1956, 200). Swidden farming was practised in Siberia at least until the 1930s, using specially selected varieties of "swidden-rye" (Steensberg 1993, 98).

In Eastern Europe and Northern Russia the main swidden crops were turnips, barley, flax, rye, wheat, oats, radishes and millet. Cropping periods were usually one year, but were extended to two or three years on very favourable soils. Fallow periods were between 20 and 40 years (Linnard 1970, 195). In Finland in 1949, Steensberg (1993, 111) observed the clearing and burning of a 60,000 square metres (15 acres) swidden 440 km north of Helsinki.

Birch and pine trees had been cleared over a period of a year and the logs sold for cash. A fallow of alder (Alnus) was encouraged to improve soil conditions. After the burn, turnip was sown for sale and for cattle feed. Shifting cultivation was disappearing in this part of Finland because of a loss of agricultural labour to the industries of the towns. Steensberg (1993, 110–152) provides eye-witness descriptions of shifting cultivation being practised in Sweden in the 20th century, and in Estonia, Poland, the Caucasus, Serbia, Bosnia, Hungary, Switzerland, Austria and Germany in the 1930s to the 1950s.

That these agricultural practices survived from the Neolithic into the middle of the 20th century amidst the sweeping changes that occurred in Europe over that period, suggests they were adaptive and in themselves, were not massively destructive of the environments in which they were practiced.

The earliest written accounts of deforestation in Southern Europe begin around 1000 BC in the histories of Homer, Thucydides and Plato and in Strabo's Geography. Forests were exploited for ship building, and urban development, the manufacture of casks, pitch and charcoal, as well as being cleared for agriculture. The intensification of trade and as a result of warfare, increased the demand for ships which were manufactured completely from forest products. Although goat herding is singled out as an important cause of environmental degradation, a more important cause of forest destruction was the practice in some places of granting ownership rights to those who clear felled forests and brought the land into permanent cultivation.

Evidence that circumstances other than agriculture were the major causes for forest destruction was the recovery of tree cover in many parts of the Roman empire from 400 BC to around 500 AD following the collapse of Roman economy and industry. Darby observes that by 400 AD "land that had once been tilled became derelict and overgrown" and quotes Lactantius who wrote that in many places "cultivated land became forest" (Darby 1956, 186). The other major cause of forest destruction in the Mediterranean environment with its hot dry summers were wild fires that became more common following human interference in the forests.

In Central and Northern Europe the use of stone tools and fire in agriculture is well established in the palynological and archaeological record from the Neolithic. Here, just as in Southern Europe, the demands of more intensive agriculture and the invention of the plough, trading, mining and smelting, tanning, building and construction in the growing towns and constant warfare, including the demands of naval shipbuilding, were more important forces behind the destruction of the forests than was shifting cultivation.

By the Middle Ages in Europe, large areas of forest were being cleared and converted into arable land in association with the development of feudal tenurial practices. From the 16th to the 18th centuries, the demands of iron smelters for charcoal, increasing industrial developments and the discovery and expansion of colonial empires as well as incessant warfare that increased the demand for shipping to levels never previously reached, all combined to deforest Europe.

With the loss of the forest, so shifting cultivation became restricted to the peripheral places of Europe, where permanent agriculture was uneconomic, transport costs constrained logging or terrain prevented the use of draught animals or tractors. It has disappeared from even these areas since 1945, as agriculture has become increasingly capital intensive, rural areas have become depopulated and the remnant European forests themselves have been revalued economically and socially.

Classical authors mentioned large forests, with Homer writing about "wooded Samothrace", Zakynthos, Sicily, and other woodlands. These authors indicated that the Mediterranean area once had more forest; much had already been lost, and the remainder was primarily in the mountains.

Although parts of Europe remained wooded, by the late Iron Age and early Viking Ages, forests were drastically reduced and settlements regularly moved. The reasons for this pattern of mobility, the transition to stable settlements from the late Viking period on, or the transition from shifting cultivation to stationary farming are unknown. From this period, plows are found in graves. Early agricultural peoples preferred good forests on hillsides with good drainage, and traces of cattle enclosures are evident there.

In Italy, shifting cultivation was no longer used by the common era. Tacitus describes it as a strange cultivation method, practiced by the Germans. In 98 CE, he wrote about the Germans that their fields were proportional to the participating cultivators but their crops were shared according to status. Distribution was simple, because of wide availability; they changed fields annually, with much to spare because they were producing grain rather than other crops. A W Liljenstrand wrote in his 1857 doctoral dissertation, "About Changing of Soil" (pp. 5 ff.), that Tacitus discusses shifting cultivation: "arva per annos mutant". This is the practice of shifting cultivation.

During the Migration Period in Europe, after the Roman Empire and before the Viking Age, the peoples of Central Europe moved to new forests after exhausting old parcels. Forests were quickly exhausted; the practice had ended in the Mediterranean, where forests were less resilient than the sturdier coniferous forests of Central Europe. Deforestation had been partially caused by burning to create pasture. Reduced timber delivery led to higher prices and more stone construction in the Roman Empire (Stewart 1956, p. 123). Although forests gradually decreased in northern Europe, they have survived in the Nordic countries.

Many Italic peoples saw benefits in allying with Rome. When the Romans built the Via Amerina in 241 BCE, the Falisci settled in cities on the plains and aided the Romans in road construction; the Roman Senate gradually acquired representatives from Faliscan and Etruscan families, and the Italic tribes became settled farmers.

Classical writers described peoples who practiced shifting cultivation, which characterized the Migration Period in Europe. The exploitation of forests demanded displacement as areas were deforested. Julius Caesar wrote about the Suebi in Commentarii de Bello Gallico 4.1, "They have no private and secluded fields ("privati ac separati agri apud eos nihil est") ... They cannot stay more than one year in a place for cultivation’s sake" ("neque longius anno remanere uno in loco colendi causa licet").

The Suebi lived between the Rhine and the Elbe. About the Germani, Caesar wrote: "No one has a particular field or area for himself, for the magistrates and chiefs give year by year to the people and the clans, who have gathered together, as much land and in such places as seem good to them and then make them move on after a year" ("Neque quisquam agri modum certum aut fines habet proprios, sed magistratus ac principes in annos singulos gentibus cognationibusque hominum, qui tum una coierunt, a quantum et quo loco visum est agri attribuunt atque anno post alio transire cogunt" [Book 6.22]).

Strabo (63 BCE—c. 20 CE) also writes about the Suebi in his Geography (VII, 1, 3): "Common to all the people in this area is that they can easily change residence because of their sordid way of life; they do not cultivate fields or collect property, but live in temporary huts. They get their nourishment from their livestock for the most part, and like nomads, pack all their goods in wagons and go on to wherever they want". Horace writes in 17 BCE (Carmen Saeculare, 3, 24, 9ff.) about the people of Macedonia: "The proud Getae also live happily, growing free food and cereal for themselves on land they do not want to cultivate for more than a year" ("Vivunt et rigidi Getae, / immetata quibus iugera liberas / fruges et Cererem ferunt, / nec cultura placet longior annua").

== Simple societies and environmental change ==
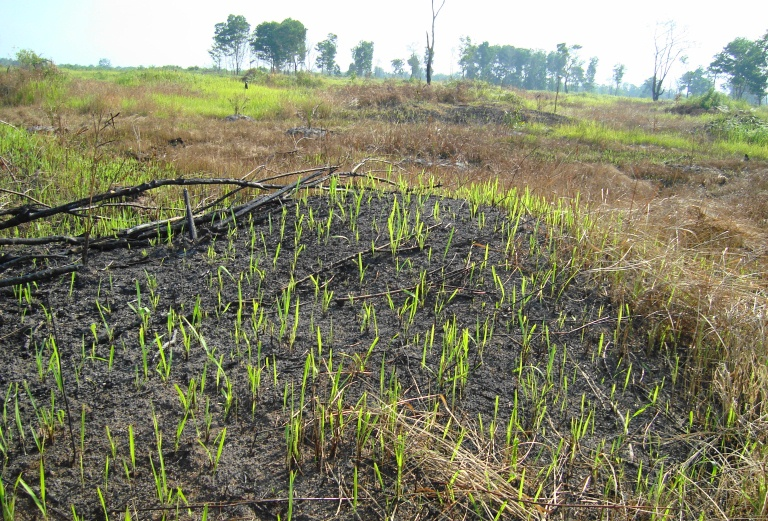
Shifting cultivation in Indonesia. A new crop is sprouting through the burnt soil.

A growing body of palynological evidence finds that simple human societies brought about extensive changes to their environments before the establishment of any sort of state, feudal or capitalist, and before the development of large scale mining, smelting or shipbuilding industries. In these societies agriculture was the driving force in the economy and shifting cultivation was the most common type of agriculture practiced. By examining the relationships between social and economic change and agricultural change in these societies, insights can be gained on contemporary social and economic change and global environment change, and the place of shifting cultivation in those relationships.

As early as 1930 questions about relationships between the rise and fall of the Mayan civilization of the Yucatán Peninsula and shifting cultivation were raised and continue to be debated today. Archaeological evidence suggests the development of Mayan society and economy began around 250 AD. A mere 700 years later it reached its apogee, by which time the population may have reached 2,000,000 people. There followed a precipitous decline that left the great cities and ceremonial centres vacant and overgrown with jungle vegetation. The causes of this decline are uncertain; but warfare and the exhaustion of agricultural land are commonly cited (Meggers 1954; Dumond 1961; Turner 1974). More recent work suggests the Maya may have, in suitable places, developed irrigation systems and more intensive agricultural practices (Humphries 1993).

Similar paths appear to have been followed by Polynesian settlers in New Zealand and the Pacific Islands, who within 500 years of their arrival around 1100 AD turned substantial areas from forest into scrub and fern and in the process caused the elimination of numerous species of birds and animals (Kirch and Hunt 1997). In the restricted environments of the Pacific islands, including Fiji and Hawaii, early extensive erosion and change of vegetation is presumed to have been caused by shifting cultivation on slopes. Soils washed from slopes were deposited in valley bottoms as a rich, swampy alluvium.

These new environments were then exploited to develop intensive, irrigated fields. The change from shifting cultivation to intensive irrigated fields occurred in association with a rapid growth in population and the development of elaborate and highly stratified chiefdoms (Kirch 1984). In the larger, temperate latitude, islands of New Zealand the presumed course of events took a different path. There the stimulus for population growth was the hunting of large birds to extinction, during which time forests in drier areas were destroyed by burning, followed the development of intensive agriculture in favorable environments, based mainly on sweet potato (Ipomoea batatas) and a reliance on the gathering of two main wild plant species in less favorable environments. These changes, as in the smaller islands, were accompanied by population growth, the competition for the occupation of the best environments, complexity in social organization, and endemic warfare (Anderson 1997).

The record of humanly induced changes in environments is longer in New Guinea than in most places. Agricultural activities probably began 5,000 to 9,000 years ago. However, the most spectacular changes, in both societies and environments, are believed to have occurred in the central highlands of the island within the last 1,000 years, in association with the introduction of a crop new to New Guinea, the sweet potato (Golson 1982a; 1982b). One of the most striking signals of the relatively recent intensification of agriculture is the sudden increase in sedimentation rates in small lakes.

The root question posed by these and the numerous other examples that could be cited of simple societies that have intensified their agricultural systems in association with increases in population and social complexity is not whether or how shifting cultivation was responsible for the extensive changes to landscapes and environments. Rather it is why simple societies of shifting cultivators in the tropical forest of Yucatán, or the highlands of New Guinea, began to grow in numbers and to develop stratified and sometimes complex social hierarchies?

At first sight, the greatest stimulus to the intensification of a shifting cultivation system is a growth in population. If no other changes occur within the system, for each extra person to be fed from the system, a small extra amount of land must be cultivated. The total amount of land available is the land being presently cropped and all of the land in fallow. If the area occupied by the system is not expanded into previously unused land, then either the cropping period must be extended or the fallow period shortened.

At least two problems exist with the population growth hypothesis. First, population growth in most pre-industrial shifting cultivator societies has been shown to be very low over the long term. Second, no human societies are known where people work only to eat. People engage in social relations with each other and agricultural produce is used in the conduct of these relationships.

These relationships are the focus of two attempts to understand the nexus between human societies and their environments, one an explanation of a particular situation and the other a general exploration of the problem.

=== Feedback loops ===
In a study of the Duna in the Southern Highlands of New Guinea, a group in the process of moving from shifting cultivation into permanent field agriculture post sweet potato, Modjeska (1982) argued for the development of two "self amplifying feed back loops" of ecological and social causation. The trigger to the changes were very slow population growth and the slow expansion of agriculture to meet the demands of this growth. This set in motion the first feedback loop, the "use-value" loop.

As more forest was cleared there was a decline in wild food resources and protein produced from hunting, which was substituted for by an increase in domestic pig raising. An increase in domestic pigs required a further expansion in agriculture. The greater protein available from the larger number of pigs increased human fertility and survival rates and resulted in faster population growth.

The outcome of the operation of the two loops, one bringing about ecological change and the other social and economic change, is an expanding and intensifying agricultural system, the conversion of forest to grassland, a population growing at an increasing rate and expanding geographically and a society that is increasing in complexity and stratification.

=== Resources are cultural appraisals ===
The second attempt to explain the relationships between simple agricultural societies and their environments is that of Ellen (1982, 252–270). Ellen does not attempt to separate use-values from social production. He argues that almost all of the materials required by humans to live (with perhaps the exception of air) are obtained through social relations of production and that these relations proliferate and are modified in numerous ways. The values that humans attribute to items produced from the environment arise out of cultural arrangements and not from the objects themselves, a restatement of Carl Sauer's dictum that "resources are cultural appraisals".

Humans frequently translate actual objects into culturally conceived forms, an example being the translation by the Duna of the pig into an item of compensation and redemption. As a result, two fundamental processes underlie the ecology of human social systems: First, the obtaining of materials from the environment and their alteration and circulation through social relations, and second, giving the material a value which will affect how important it is to obtain it, circulate it or alter it. Environmental pressures are thus mediated through social relations.

Transitions in ecological systems and in social systems do not proceed at the same rate. The rate of phylogenetic change is determined mainly by natural selection and partly by human interference and adaptation, such as for example, the domestication of a wild species. Humans however have the ability to learn and to communicate their knowledge to each other and across generations. If most social systems have the tendency to increase in complexity they will, sooner or later, come into conflict with, or into "contradiction" (Friedman 1979, 1982) with their environments. What happens around the point of "contradiction" will determine the extent of the environmental degradation that will occur. Of particular importance is the ability of the society to change, to invent or to innovate technologically and sociologically, in order to overcome the "contradiction" without incurring continuing environmental degradation, or social disintegration.

An economic study of what occurs at the points of conflict with specific reference to shifting cultivation is that of Esther Boserup (1965). Boserup argues that low intensity farming, extensive shifting cultivation for example, has lower labor costs than more intensive farming systems. This assertion remains controversial. She also argues that given a choice, a human group will always choose the technique which has the lowest absolute labor cost rather than the highest yield. But at the point of conflict, yields will have become unsatisfactory.

Boserup argues, contra Malthus, that rather than population always overwhelming resources, that humans will invent a new agricultural technique or adopt an existing innovation that will boost yields and that is adapted to the new environmental conditions created by the degradation which has occurred already, even though they will pay for the increases in higher labor costs. Examples of such changes are the adoption of new higher yielding crops, the exchanging of a digging stick for a hoe, or a hoe for a plough, or the development of irrigation systems. The controversy over Boserup's proposal is in part over whether intensive systems are more costly in labor terms, and whether humans will bring about change in their agricultural systems before environmental degradation forces them to.

== In the contemporary world and global environmental change ==
Contemporary shifting cultivation practice

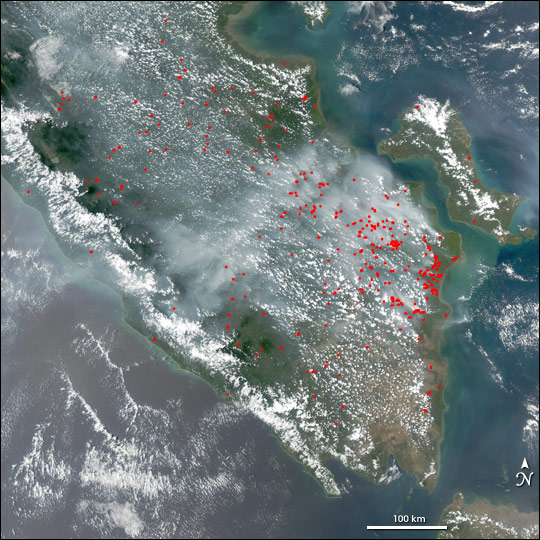
Sumatra, Indonesia

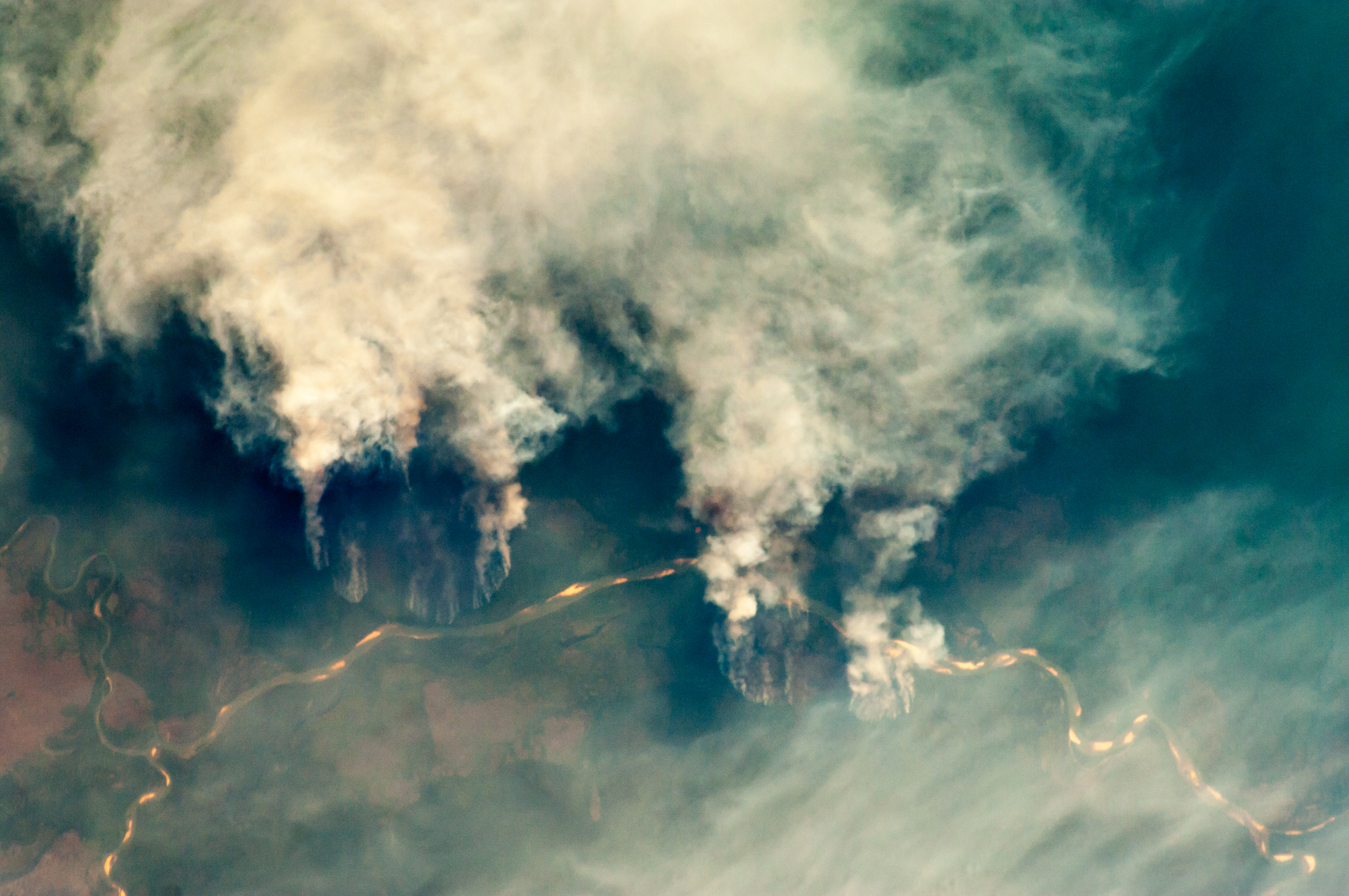
Rio Xingu, Brazil

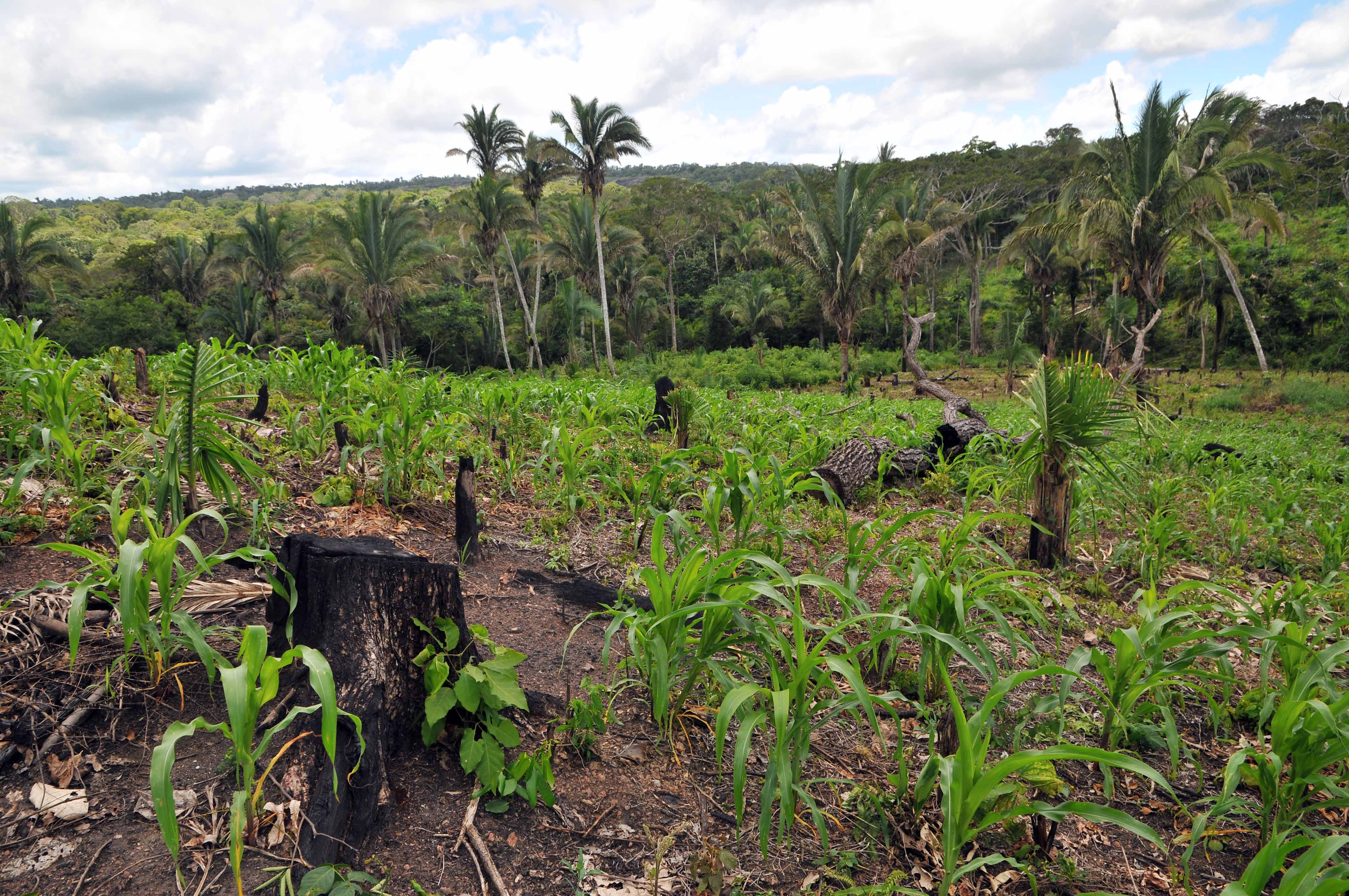
Santa Cruz, Bolivia

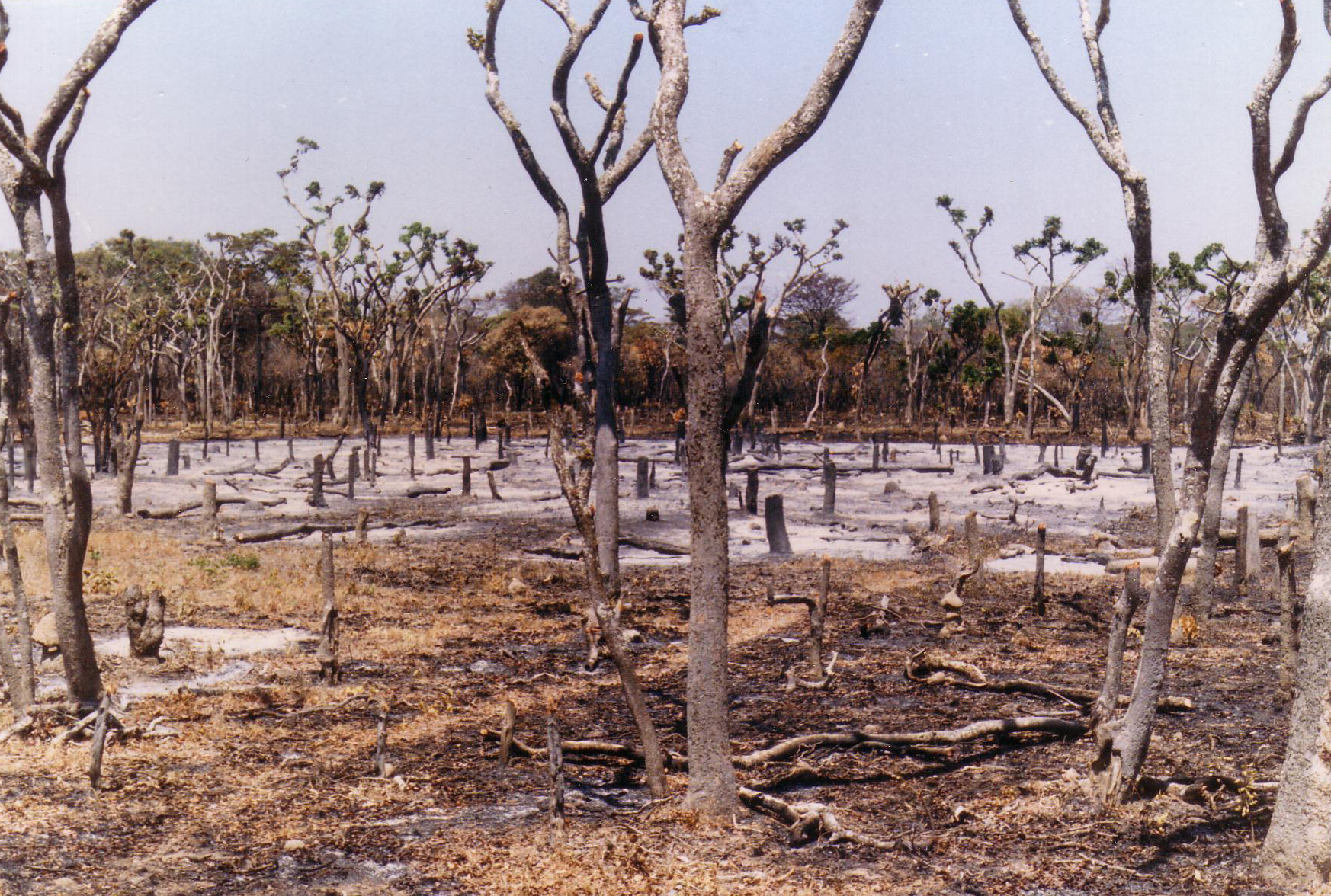
Kasempa, Zambia

The estimated rate of deforestation in Southeast Asia in 1990 was 34,000 km^{2} per year (FAO 1990, quoted in Potter 1993). In Indonesia alone it was estimated 13,100 km^{2} per year were being lost, 3,680 km^{2} per year from Sumatra and 3,770 km^{2} from Kalimantan, of which 1,440 km^{2} were due to the fires of 1982 to 1983. Since those estimates were made huge fires have ravaged Indonesian forests during the 1997 to 1998 El Niño associated drought.

Shifting cultivation was assessed by the Food and Agriculture Organization (FAO) to be one of the causes of deforestation while logging was not. The apparent discrimination against shifting cultivators caused a confrontation between FAO and environmental groups, who saw the FAO supporting commercial logging interests against the rights of indigenous people (Potter 1993, 108). Other independent studies of the problem note that despite lack of government control over forests and the dominance of a political elite in the logging industry, the causes of deforestation are more complex.

The loggers have provided paid employment to former subsistence farmers. One of the outcomes of cash incomes has been rapid population growth among indigenous groups of former shifting cultivators that has placed pressure on their traditional long fallow farming systems. Many farmers have taken advantage of the improved road access to urban areas by planting cash crops, such as rubber or pepper as noted above. Increased cash incomes often are spent on chain saws, which have enabled larger areas to be cleared for cultivation.

Fallow periods have been reduced and cropping periods extended. Serious poverty elsewhere in the country has brought thousands of land-hungry settlers into the cut-over forests along the logging roads. The settlers practice what appears to be shifting cultivation but which is in fact a one-cycle slash and burn followed by continuous cropping, with no intention to long fallow. Clearing of trees and the permanent cultivation of fragile soils in a tropical environment with little attempt to replace lost nutrients may cause rapid degradation of the fragile soils.

The loss of forest in Indonesia, Thailand, and the Philippines during the 1990s was preceded by major ecosystem disruptions in Vietnam, Laos and Cambodia in the 1970s and 1980s caused by warfare. Forests were sprayed with defoliants, thousands of rural forest dwelling people were uprooted from their homes and driven into previously isolated areas. The loss of the tropical forests of Southeast Asia is the particular outcome of the general possible outcomes described by Ellen (see above) when small local ecological and social systems become part of a larger system.

When the previous relatively stable ecological relationships are destabilized, degradation can occur rapidly. Similar descriptions of the loss of forest and destruction of fragile ecosystems could be provided from the Amazon Basin, by large scale state sponsored colonization forest land (Becker 1995, 61) or from the Central Africa where what endemic armed conflict is destabilizing rural settlement and farming communities on a massive scale.

== Comparison with other ecological phenomena ==
In the tropical developing world, shifting cultivation in its many diverse forms, remains a pervasive practice. Shifting cultivation was one of the first forms of agriculture practiced by humans and its survival into the modern world suggests that it is a flexible and highly adaptive means of production. However, it is also a grossly misunderstood practice. Many casual observers cannot see past the clearing and burning of standing forest and do not perceive often ecologically stable cycles of cropping and fallowing. Nevertheless, shifting cultivation systems are particularly susceptible to rapid increases in population and to economic and social change in the larger world around them.

The blame for the destruction of forest resources is often laid on shifting cultivators. But the forces bringing about the rapid loss of tropical forests at the end of the 20th century are the same forces that led to the destruction of the forests of Europe, urbanization, industrialization, increased affluence, populational growth and geographical expansion and the application the latest technology to extract ever more resources from the environment in pursuit of wealth and political power by competing groups. However we must know that those who practice Agriculture are at the receiving end of the social stratum.

== Alternative practice in the pre-Columbian Amazon basin ==
Slash-and-char, as opposed to slash-and-burn, may create self-perpetuating soil fertility that supports sedentary agriculture, but the society so sustained may still be overturned, as above (see article at Terra preta).

== See also ==
- Agroecology
- Inga alley cropping
- Jhum
- Milpa
