= Eksali forest land =

Forest plots in Maharashtra, India

Eksali forest land or Eksali plots (Marathi: एकसाली प्लॉट) are areas designated for shifting cultivation in the forest areas of the Thane and Raigad districts of Maharashtra state, India. These plots are 4 hectares (9.9 acres) or more in area. Separate Eksali plots working circle are carved in the working plan for the management of these forest lands. Before independence in the British Raj, Eksali plots were provided for cultivation with the objective of encouraging human habitation in outlying forest areas to supply labourers for forest works including the felling of trees, raising of plant nurseries, planting saplings, nurturing the tree plantations and protecting the forests. Despite the fact that these lands were recorded on forest maps as a result of the Indian Forest (Conservation) Act of 1980, it was not feasible to permanently assign the land to the farmer until the Scheduled Tribes and Other Traditional Forest Dwellers (Recognition of Forest Rights) Act of 2006. This second act made it possible to allot the lands to the tribal landless cultivators holding the plots in forest areas. While the ownership of Dali land was collective, the ownership of Eksali forest land was individual and enabled allotments.
