= Fauna of the Amazon rainforest =

Native animals of the Amazon rainforest

Fauna of the Amazon rainforest refers to all the animal life that inhabits the Amazon rainforest. The different animal species and groups of animals make up the collective fauna of the rainforest. Overall, faunal biodiversity in the Amazon has evolved to be the most diverse and plentiful fauna in any one location on Earth. The main groupings that animal species are categorized into are: birds, mammals, reptiles, amphibians, fish, and insects. These groups are all vital to the health and structure of the Amazonian ecosystem; however, many species are at great risk of being lost to extinction due to human activities.

== Overview ==
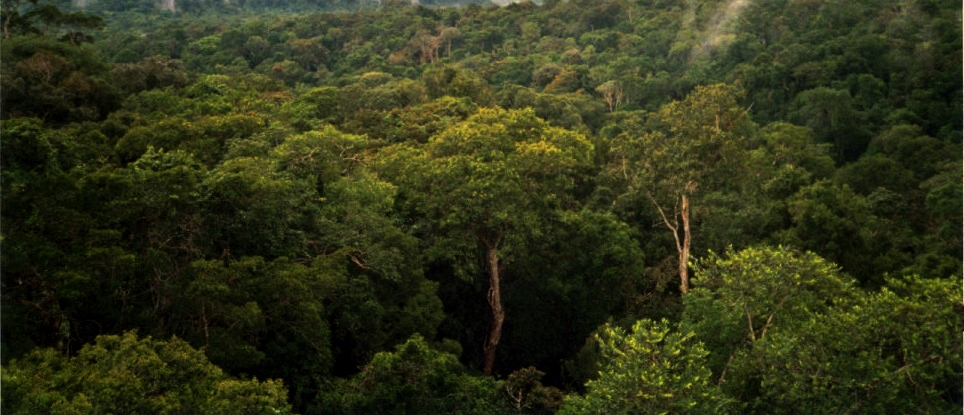
Amazon rainforest in Manaus, Brazil

The Amazon rainforest is one of the most biodiverse regions on planet Earth. It is the most biodiverse rainforest in the world, and it achieved this title through a multitude of factors; the most notable being the high rate of speciation and dispersal events across the continent of South America. The greater western and upper regions of the Amazon rainforest, particularly the Yasuní National Park in Ecuador, are the most species-rich areas, both in the Amazon and in the world as a whole. The Amazon holds around 10%-25% of the planet's biodiversity; a number comprised of an estimated 1,000,000-2,500,000+ species of animals across the entirety of the rainforest. Most of the animal species are insects; however, the Amazon is home to an incredible number of bird, mammal, reptile, amphibian, and fish species as well. The number of currently known species is considered to be vastly underestimating the true variety of life in the rainforest, as many species have yet to be discovered by humans.

== Birds ==
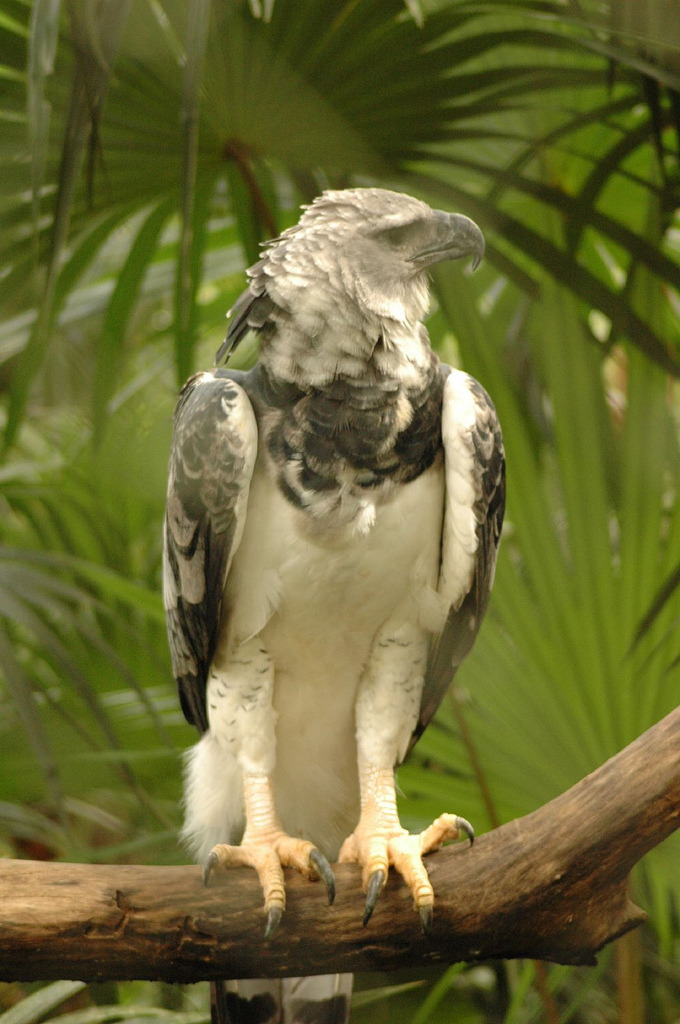
Harpy eagle (Harpia harpyja)

Roughly 14% of all birds on Earth are located in the Amazon rainforest. This percentage is comprised of around 1,300 known, distinct species; 20% of which are endemic to the Amazon. Approximately 11% of the birds found in the Amazon rainforest have been declared endangered as of 2025. This is due, in large part, to the wide-scale deforestation of the Amazon and subsequent habitat loss. Birds are crucial to the ecosystem of the rainforest, serving as seed dispersers, pollinators, and pest controllers. They tend to be especially sensitive to the environmental changes brought on by global warming and climate change, providing another layer of importance to conservation efforts. Some notable species of birds found in the Amazon include the Hoatzin, the Harpy eagle, and the Blue-and-yellow macaw.

The Hoatzin, scientific name Opisthocomus hoazin, is a unique species of bird that is only found in the Amazonian region. They are most remarkable for their way of digesting food. Hoatzins are the only birds that ferment the vegetation they eat, similar to the way a ruminant would in their gut. However, unlike ruminants, the fermentation does not happen in their stomach. These birds possess a crop with a microbial ecosystem that ferments the leaves, buds, and other plants that make up their diet. These birds spend most of their time in the trees and surrounding undergrowth of the swampy regions of the Amazon and Orinoco river basins. Hoatzins are not excellent fliers, but the juveniles will often jump from their nests into the water below to swim away from predators and other dangers.

Harpy eagles, or Harpia harpyja, are the largest Neotropical birds of prey. Their position as apex predators solidifies their classification as a keystone and umbrella species. Their prey primarily includes various two-toed and three-toed sloths, howler monkeys, spider monkeys, and capuchins; however, other animals such as armadillos, anteaters, and iguanas are also food sources for them. Harpy eagles are diurnal, meaning they are awake and active during the day, where they spend most of the time in the high canopy or hunting for food. These eagles share a unique characteristic with owls: an adaptation called a facial disc. Facial discs are a special circular arrangement of feathers around a bird's face that can be lifted and lowered to direct sounds to the ears for a keen sense of hearing.

The Blue-and-yellow macaw (Ara ararauna) is also referred to as a Blue-and-gold macaw; both names originating from their vivid plumage of azure blue on their dorsal side and golden-yellow ventral side. In the Amazon, Blue-and-yellow macaws are often found in the lowlands of the rainforest nesting in tree cavities, eating a variety of nuts and fruits, and communicating with other birds using their loud calls that can be heard for miles. These birds usually pair together in twos and mate for life.

== Mammals ==
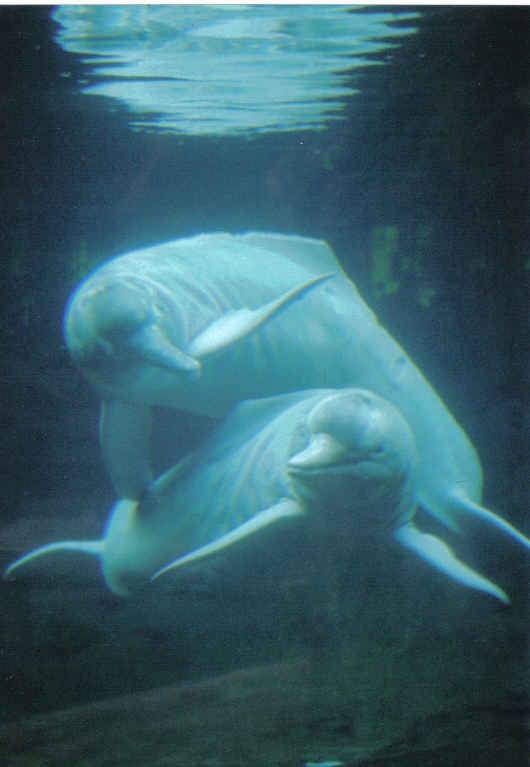
Amazon river dolphin (Inia geoffrensis)

Mammals of the Amazon rainforest come in a wide array of unique and diverse species. Many species still remain unknown to science, but, on average, one new genus and eight new species of mammals were discovered per year from 1992 to 2000 alone. In fact, of all the new species of Neotropical mammals discovered during that time period, most of them were found in the Amazon basin. At least 427 mammalian species have been discovered and recorded in the Amazon, according to current scientific knowledge. The mysteries surrounding many of the species hidden in the rainforest are particularly detrimental to conservation efforts. One of the key components of putting effective conservation policies in place is understanding the richness and dispersal patterns of Amazonian mammalian biodiversity. Therefore, without this knowledge, another layer of difficulty is added to an already time-sensitive endeavor, as an estimated 21% of mammal species in the Amazon are being faced with the threat of extinction. Similar to the role that birds play in the Amazon rainforest, mammals are also incredibly important in relation to seed dispersal and pollination. Primates are among the most critical for these processes, including fruit-eating monkeys like the spider monkey. The fruit that makes up their diet allows the plant's seeds to be spread all throughout the forest via the animal's feces, maintaining and supporting the tropical forest's diversity. The mammals of Amazonia provide a multitude of other essential services for humans and the environment alike, such as carbon sequestration and general support of the complex, interconnected web of processes that the Amazon rainforest depends on to survive.

One of the most unique mammal species in the Amazon, and in any part of the world, is the Amazon river dolphin (Inia geoffrensis). This species also has two other subspecies: Inia araguaiaensis and Inia boliviensis. The Amazon river dolphin is the largest freshwater dolphin, with the heaviest recorded male weighing 207 kilograms, or 456 pounds. Despite their large size, these dolphins have many adaptations that allow for agile swimming to thrive in their South American river habitats, to which they are endemic. Their flexible bodies, non-fused cervical vertebrae, and the structure of the bones in their shoulders and sternum allow for great maneuverability when weaving in between the branches, roots, and trunks of flooded forests to catch prey. Unlike other dolphins, the front of their head is soft and protrudes out in a rounded, bulbous shape. The Amazon river dolphin will contract the muscles in this area to echolocate.

== Reptiles ==
Southern green anaconda (Eunectes murinus)

The Amazon rainforest hosts a variety of different reptiles, including snakes, lizards, turtles, and caimans, to name a few. The immense variety of adaptations within this group allows reptilian species to inhabit nearly every corner of the rainforest, from climbing among the canopy of the trees to swimming in various bodies of water. This group of animals, like all the others, plays a critical role in the ecosystem of the Amazon as a key component of the many interconnected processes of the rainforest, including food webs and symbiotic relationships. In accordance with the trend of extremely high biodiversity in other animal groups, the rainforest similarly holds communities with some of the highest species richness of reptiles on planet Earth. Upwards of 828 species of reptiles live across the Amazon basin. Like countless other creatures in the Amazon, reptiles too are threatened by human activity such as deforestation-related habitat loss. Climate change and global warming also have a large impact on reptilian species, as reptiles are ectotherms, meaning they rely on the temperature of their surrounding environment to regulate their body temperature. This makes them particularly susceptible to the increased warming of the planet, and subsequent climate differences, to the point that certain species are being pushed toward extinction.

The Southern green anaconda, or Eunectes murinus, is the largest extant snake, weighing up to 250 kilograms, or 550 pounds. Until recently, there was only one recorded species of green anaconda: the Eunectes murinus. However, in 2024, genetic data revealed that there are actually two distinct species of green anaconda thought to have diverged approximately 10 million years ago. Eunectes murinus was renamed the Southern green anaconda, and the newly reclassified Northern green anaconda is known as Eunectes akayima. There is still much to be discovered when it comes to distinguishing between species, so further studies are still being done on these snakes. The Southern green anaconda is an aquatic snake that makes its home in rivers, streams, palm swamps, and oxbow lakes. When basking, they can be found on logs and floating vegetation mats, but otherwise, these snakes are very elusive and stay hidden most of the time. They are often concealed underneath or within logs, trunks, and various other types of detritus and vegetation. For this reason, Southern green anacondas are a difficult species to study, which is one of the factors that contributed to the two green anaconda species remaining grouped together for so long.

== Amphibians ==
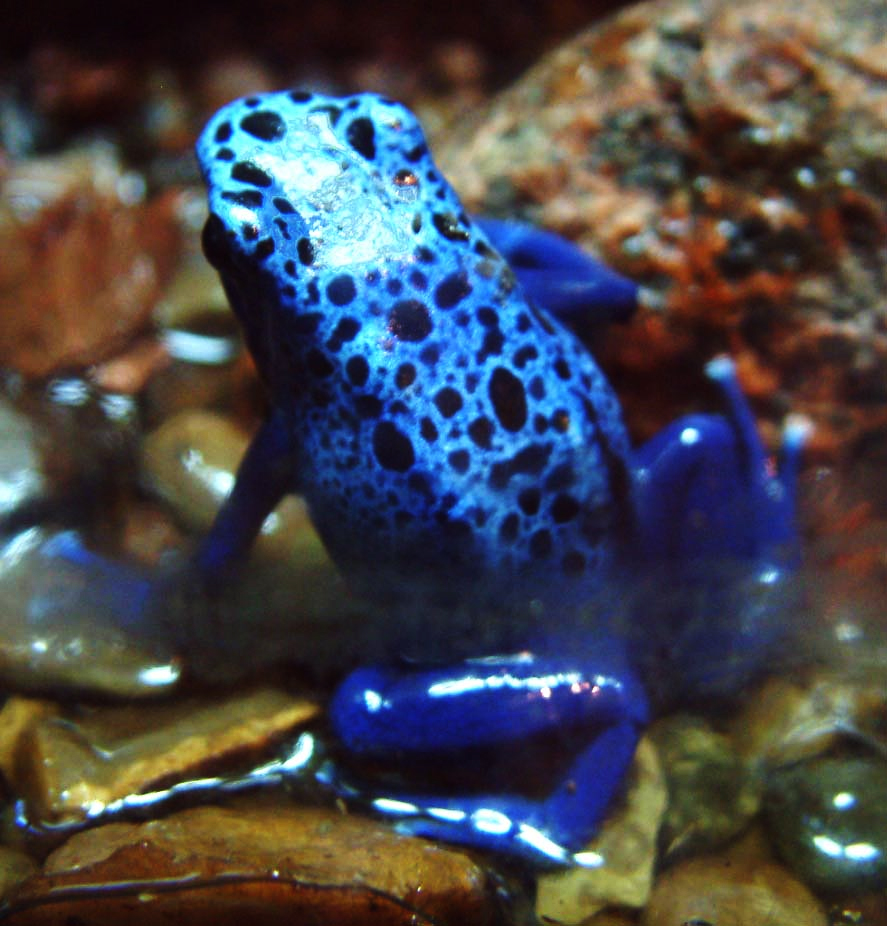
Blue poison dart frog (Dendrobates tinctorius azureus)

Over 1,000 species of amphibians populate the Amazon rainforest. Despite their abundance throughout the rainforest, scientific knowledge is lacking in this particular group of Amazonian animals, as they are thought to be less charismatic than groups like mammals and birds. In this way, amphibians are very similar to reptiles, which also tend to be disliked or feared. Amphibians are also ectotherms, meaning they share reptiles' sensitivity and vulnerability to the globe's changing temperatures and climate. Only about 14% of the Amazon has been well studied in relation to amphibian biodiversity, with the southern and southeastern regions of the Amazon remaining particularly understudied. This lack of knowledge is detrimental to conservation efforts, as around 18% of discovered amphibians in the Amazon are at risk of extinction.

Blue poison dart frogs, scientific name Dendrobates tinctorius azureus, are found exclusively in the Sipaliwini Savanna: an isolated Amazonian savanna habitat located in Brazil and Suriname. These bright-blue, spotted frogs got their name because some native South American tribes would rub the darts they used for hunting against a poison dart frog's skin to make the weapon more efficient and lethal. Blue poison dart frogs are not poisonous by themselves; instead, they get their toxins from the ants and mites that make up their diet. These frogs exhibit aposematism via their vibrant, colorful skin that warns predators of their toxicity. The Blue poison dart frog thrives in the warm, humid, tropical environments of forest islands within the Sipaliwini Savanna, and they can usually be found near small streams among moss-covered rocks or climbing the surrounding trees.

== Fish ==
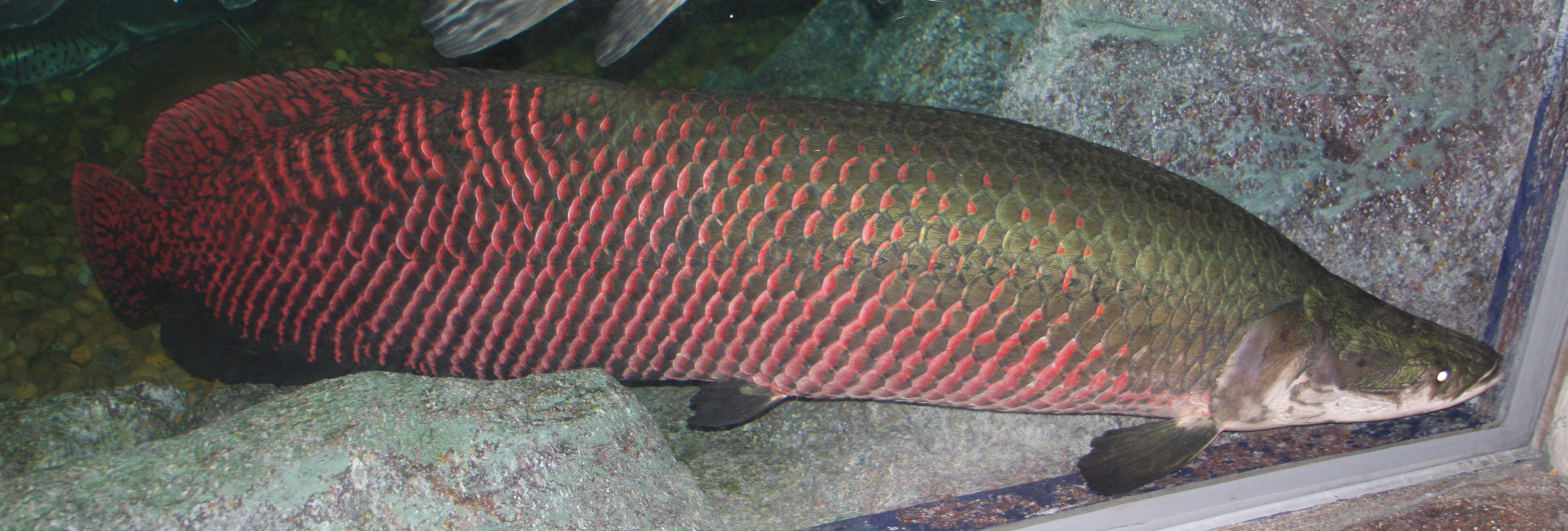
Arapaima (Arapaima gigas)

Amazonian freshwater fish represent some of the highest biodiversity of all vertebrate fauna on the planet. Over 5,600 species live in bodies of water in the Amazon that make up less than 0.002% of the liquid freshwater on Earth. In the western Amazon, many of the fish that make up this diverse array of creatures predate the Late Miocene-Pliocene era uplift, which was a time of significant tectonic plate movement that shaped and isolated the landscape of the Amazon basin. This means that these ancient Amazonian fish species are over 4 million years old. The isolation of the Amazon basin resulted in many fish that are habitat specialists, and this is one of the leading explanations as to why there is such an exceptional amount of biodiversity of Amazonian fish. The idea is that natural selection selects for higher fitness, which, in the case of the Amazon basin, was the fish that were habitat specialists and encountered less competition for resources within their isolated bodies of water. Each species occupying a different, specific niche in its environment lead to increased diversification and adaptive radiation.

The Arapaima (Arapaima gigas) is one of the largest species of freshwater fish, and also the largest air-breathing freshwater fish. They can grow up to 3 meters long, nearly 10 feet, and weigh 200 kilograms, or 440 pounds. Arapaimas possess a gas bladder as part of their respiratory system; an adaptation for living in the waters of the Amazon basin, which can contain extremely low amounts of dissolved oxygen. This fish will go up to the water's surface to gulp air every 5 to 15 minutes. The overhunting/overfishing of the Arapaima, both for food and for their scales, has resulted in a decrease in their populations throughout the Amazonian floodplains. Their scales are extremely thick and tough, which in the wild protects them and serves as a type of natural armor against attacks. However, this durability also made their scales and skin highly sought after in the fashion industry.

== Insects ==
Menelaus blue morpho (Morpho menelaus)

Insects are the most abundant animal group of the Amazon, and this pattern is seen across the entire Earth as well. Insect biodiversity dwarfs that of other existing fauna, as insects make up about 73% of all animal species currently discovered across the globe. While the other Amazonian animal groups are comprised of hundreds to thousands of individual species, insect species reach the millions. Even with the immense amount of recorded species, only an estimated 20% of insects have been officially described worldwide. Insects, especially in tropical areas like the Amazon rainforest, are infamous for being vectors for the spread of disease. Mosquitos are considered the deadliest animals in the world, as they are responsible for over 700,000 deaths per year due to the infectious diseases they transmit. Some of the most fatal diseases they carry are present in the Amazonian region, including malaria, yellow fever, dengue fever, chikungunya, and Zika. Despite the danger that insects can pose to humans, they are a vital part of the ecosystem of the Amazon rainforest. In this environment, they pollinate plants, make up the diets of countless other species, and maintain and regenerate the rainforest in numerous other ways.

The butterfly known as the Menelaus blue morpho, or Morpho menelaus, inhabits old-growth forest habitats of the Amazon and other areas of the Neotropics. These butterflies possess a striking blue color on the dorsal side of their wings while the ventral sides of their wings are shades of brown. The contrasting colors are thought to be for the purpose of confusing predators, as the flapping of their wings in flight creates a flashing pattern of iridescent blue. Instead of pigment, the microscopic scales that cover their wings reflect light to give them their color and iridescence. Menelaus blue morpho butterflies use a proboscis to feed on the juices of decaying fruit, rotting animal matter, and tree sap.
