= Anthrosol =

Soil modified by humans

An anthrosol (or anthropogenic soil) in the World Reference Base for Soil Resources (WRB) is a type of soil that has been formed or heavily modified due to long-term human activity, such as from irrigation, addition of organic waste or wet-field cultivation used to create paddy fields.

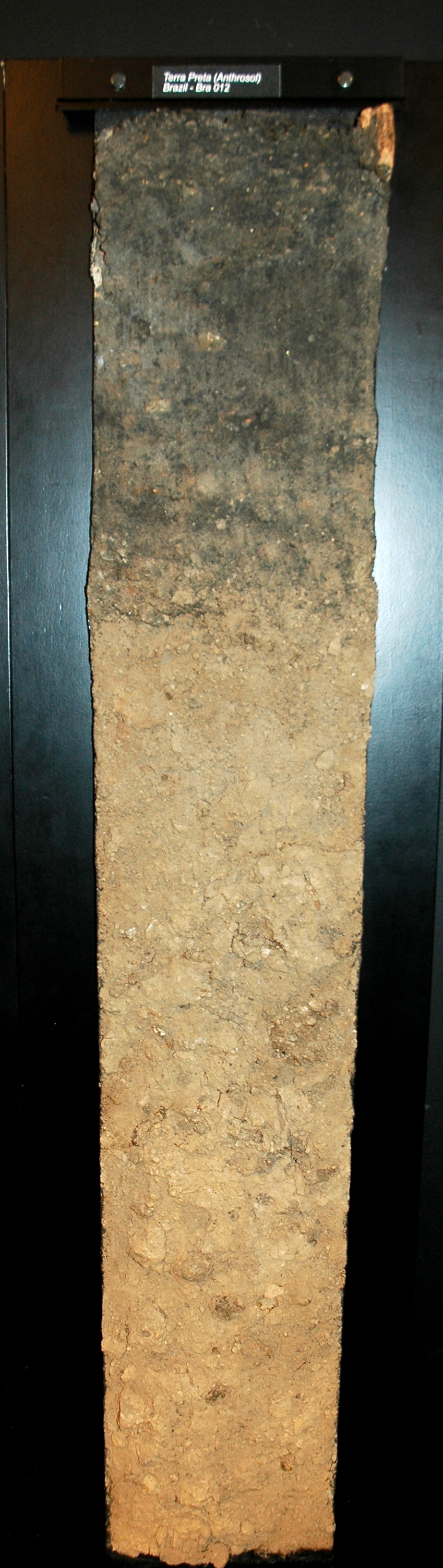
A soil profile of terra preta, an anthrosol found in the Amazon Basin.

Such soils can be formed from any parent soil, and are commonly found in areas where agriculture has been practiced for centuries. Anthrosols can be found worldwide, though they tend to have different soil horizons in different regions. For example, in northwestern Europe anthrosols commonly have plaggic or terric (strongly affected by manure) horizons, and together they cover some 500,000 hectares.

Due to the broad range of anthrosol compositions and structures compared to other soils of the same order of classification, there is debate on whether anthrosol should be included as an independent soil group.

== Composition ==
Anthrosols can have different characteristics based on their origins. A high phosphate concentration is a common indicator of decaying organic matter, such as bones, tissue, or excrement. A dark color can also be the result of a high amount of organic matter, or of calcium carbonate, iron, and manganese. A high pH or carbonate concentration, in anthropogenic terms, is likely the result of the addition of wood ash to the soil. Presence of human artifacts such as tools and waste can also be present in anthrosols. Other indicators include nitrogen, calcium, potassium, magnesium, iron, copper, and zinc concentrations.

== In archaeology ==
The presence of anthrosols can be used to detect long-term human habitation, and has been used by archaeologists to identify sites of interest. Anthrosols that can indicate such activity can be described as, for instance, plaggic (from the long-term use of manure to enrich soil), irragric (from the use of flood or surface irrigation), hortic (from deep cultivation, manure use and presence of other anthropogenic organic matter such as kitchen waste), anthraquic (from anthropos – man and aqua – water – meaning produced by man-made soil moisture management including irrigation or terracing). Anthrosols can be detected by visual inspection of soils, or even from satellite imagery.

== Other uses ==
Because of a high concentration of minerals, and in particular decayed organic matter, anthrosols are useful for agriculture. In an environmental context, well-managed anthrosols act as a carbon sink.

== See also ==
- Anthrepts from a different soil classification system
- Necrosol
- Technosols
- Terra preta
- Pre-Columbian agriculture in the Amazon Basin
