= Constructed soil =

Mixture of materials designed to approximate natural soils

Constructed soils (also called fabricated soils) are mixtures of organic and mineral material derived from a number of sources, including repurposed organic waste, that are designed to approximate natural soils and provide a growing medium for plants. Constructed soils are commonly used in the reclamation of degraded land where natural topsoil is either not present or has been contaminated. Examples of these sites include mines, landfills, and other industrial or urban areas. Constructed soils are classified as Technosols, and often form the upper layer, or layers, in a Technosol above a geomembrane or other barrier capping waste material.

Use of constructed soils in restoring sites is preferable to importing topsoil from other locations. Topsoil harvesting means a second location will be degraded, and collection and transport expenses will generally be higher than using local materials to create a new soil. Soil that was removed and stockpiled (e.g. during the operation of a mine), can become part of a constructed soil once a site is being reclaimed.

The goal in designing a constructed soil is to replicate the physical, chemical, and biological functions of natural soils. The target soil properties depend on the site location and final land use. Constructed soils are intended to be as low-maintenance as possible, meaning they will be a stable and functional system over time that does not need additional inputs once biogeochemical cycling is established.

Where applicable, constructed soils must meet regulatory requirements dictating the acceptable thresholds of certain soil characteristics. Pathogens, harmful trace elements, salinity, and pH must be at values that are not harmful to human or environmental health. Specific values for the balance of soil nutrients, including proportion of organic matter, carbon to nitrogen ratio, and total nitrogen, may also be required to ensure prolonged soil functioning.

== Constructed soil profiles ==
Soils naturally develop differentiated horizons, where the soil properties change with depth in a soil profile. Constructed soils that are less than approximately 45 cm thick will tend to be homogenous topsoil mixtures. For thicker applications of constructed soils, natural soil profiles can be emulated and there are advantages to doing so. The most basic reason is that constructed topsoil is expensive to produce. Lower quality and less expensive materials can be used for subsoil and substratum layers. Additional layers can also improve the functioning of the soil. Thicker horizons below the topsoil increase the volume of soil available to plant roots and can be an additional nutrient source. Sublayers are also important to the regulation of water in the soil and can be used to improve or control drainage, which is critical on reclamation sites where leaching of toxic materials below the constructed soil is a concern.

When constructing a complete soil profile, the interfaces between the layers must be considered as well as the composition of each layer. Abrupt differences in soil properties at horizon boundaries (namely texture and bulk density) impacts the hydraulic functioning of a soil, determining the extent of lateral versus vertical flow and the presence of perched water in the soil. Compact layers with little pore space can also impede root growth. In some situations, clay-rich layers that act as aquitards and deflect roots are used intentionally as barriers at the base of constructed soil profiles. In sloped areas, the friction between the layers must be considered to minimize soil erosion and reduce the chance of slope failure. Soils with high water-holding capacity are also at risk of slumping (erosion by mass-wasting) if placed on slopes in wet climates.

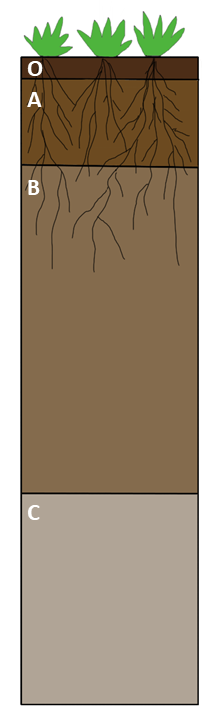
Diagram of a generic natural soil profile, with O, A, B and C horizons.

Comparison of Natural and Constructed Soil Profiles
Natural Soil Horizons	Constructed Soil
O: organic layer	Organic mulch application to protect topsoil and provide habitat and nutrients to soil organisms (excluded in projects with rapid revegetation
A: surface or topsoil	Manufactured topsoil that serves as the primary rooting medium; high fertility; carefully designed to meet specific requirements
B: subsoil or mineral soil	Bulk material to add rooting volume and increase nutrient and water storage capacity; requirements are less strict
C: substratum (parent material	Drainage layer with high porosity and high density (sand or gravel); no organic matter; thickness determined by drainage requirements

== Components of constructed soils ==
Constructed soils generally consist of three components: a mineral fraction, organic fraction, and carbon source. Each contributes different features to the soil. Selection of the individual materials making up each component depends on the specific objectives and parameters of a constructed soil project. The ratios of these components are determined by the target outcomes as well as considerations like cost and availability of materials, and how the components act when mixed. Not all options will combine well into a uniform soil mixture.

=== Mineral fraction ===
The mineral fraction forms the matrix of the soil, determining the final texture (relative percentages of sand, silt, and clay). The texture and proportion of mineral material determines the soil aeration and drainage and influences the soil structure. Beyond the size, physical properties such as the roundness of sand particles can also influence the packing of grains, changing the pore size distribution. Texture and angularity of grains also impacts the shear strength of a soil. The mineralogy of this material determines how quickly the soil will weather when subjected to the environment and which elements will be released, changing the physical and chemical characteristics of the soil over time.

=== Organic fraction ===
The organic material fraction consists of decomposed or partially decomposed organic matter. It is necessary to provide essential macronutrients and micronutrients to plants and soil organisms. This material commonly has a high water-content and high water-holding capacity. In topsoil, organic matter should not exceed 15% by weight, or approximately one-third of soil particles. Above this limit, the soil will become prone to settlement, consolidation, and waterlogging. If soil remains waterlogged over an extended period of time, the soil will become anoxic, killing most plants and many soil organisms. The selection of organic amendments can significantly influence the resulting soil properties and soil quality.

=== Carbon fraction ===
In constructed soils, the carbon source is distinguished from the organic component as it is made up of materials that will decompose slowly, providing organic matter over time. Carbon is essential to the mediation of the organic matter decomposition rate in soils. A moderate carbon-to-nitrogen ratio (C:N ~ 20:1) will keep this rate at a level that provides a sustained release of nutrients into the soil. This material also influences water retention in the soil.

Examples of Constructed Soil Materials
Mineral	Organic	Carbon
sand silt clay gravel	compost peat manure biosolids	sawdust wood pulp wood chips tree bark biochar straw

== Biological component ==
Soil, by definition, includes living organisms. However, constructed soils do not typically include this factor in the development of soil mixtures. It is expected that biotic processes will initiate themselves as a site revegetates and soil formation (pedogenesis) begins. Biotic processes are critical in the aggregation of soil particles and development of stable soil structure, something which constructed soils typically lack. The selection of plants for revegetation will impact the soil biome progression. There have also been recent developments in inoculating the soil with specific organisms through methods like direct vegetation transfer. Improved understanding of soil quality in stockpiles over time also has the potential to increase the retention of soil microorganisms.
