= Technosol =

Soil type

A Technosol in the World Reference Base for Soil Resources is a Reference Soil Group that combines soils whose properties and pedogenesis are dominated by their technical origin. They contain either a significant amount of artefacts (something in the soil recognizably made or extracted from the earth by humans), some sort of geotechnical liner, or are sealed by technic hard material (hard material created by humans, having properties unlike natural rock). They include soils from wastes (landfills, sludge, cinders, mine spoils, and ashes), pavements with their underlying unconsolidated materials, soils with geomembranes, and constructed soils in human-made materials. Transported natural soil material does not qualify as Technosol and is described with the Transportic qualifier in WRB. Technosols are often referred to as urban or mine soils. They are recognized in the new Russian soil classification system as Technogenic Superficial Formations.

Technosols are developed on materials made or exposed by human activity that otherwise would not occur at the Earth’s surface. They occur primarily in urban and industrial areas, usually in small areas, and can be associated with other soil groups in a complex pattern. They are closely related to Anthrosols, soils created by long-term measures to enhance fertility for agricultural use, like the intensive addition of organic matter to soil, such as an old urban garden.

Most research on anthropogenic soils describes specific aspects of their biology, chemistry or physical properties, cultural heritage and human geography, erosion, wastes, pollution, fertilizer management, and taxonomy. Very few of them, try to answer to the question: How fast do they start pedogenesis (viz., differentiating horizons)? A Technosol could differentiate A and O horizons at rates of more than one centimeter per year. Technosols are found throughout the world, e.g., at or near cities, roads, mines, refuse dumps, oil spills, and coal fly ash deposits. As in the case of Andacollo in Chile some technosols are created on purpose to cover up wastes such as mine tailings.

These soils are more likely to be contaminated than other soils. Many Technosols must be treated with care as they may contain toxic substances from industrial processes.

== See also ==
- Anthrosol
- Constructed soil
- Pedogenesis
- Pedology (soil study)
- Soil classification
