= Fauna =

Set of animal species in any particular region and time

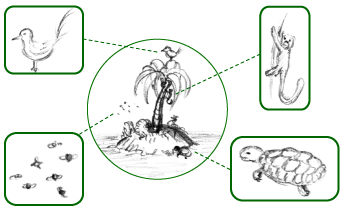
Simplified schematic of an island's fauna – all its animal species, highlighted in boxes

Fauna (pl.: faunae or faunas) is all the animal life present in a particular region or time. The corresponding terms for plants and fungi are flora and funga, respectively. Flora, fauna, funga and other forms of life are collectively referred to as biota. Zoologists and paleontologists use fauna to refer to a typical collection of animals found in a specific time or place, e.g. the "Sonoran Desert fauna" or the "Burgess Shale fauna". Paleontologists sometimes refer to a sequence of faunal stages, which is a series of rocks all containing similar fossils. The study of animals of a particular region is called faunistics.

== Etymology ==
Fauna comes from the name Fauna, a Roman goddess of earth and fertility, the Roman god Faunus, and the related forest spirits called fauns. All three words are cognates of the name of the Greek god Pan, and panis is the Modern Greek equivalent of fauna (πανίς or rather πανίδα). Fauna is also the word for a book that catalogues the animals in such a manner. The term was first used by Carl Linnaeus from Sweden in the title of his 1745 work Fauna Suecica.

== Subdivisions on the basis of region ==
=== Cryofauna ===
Cryofauna refers to the animals that live in, or very close to, cold areas.

=== Cryptofauna ===
Cryptofauna is the fauna that exists in protected or concealed microhabitats.

=== Epifauna ===
Epifauna, also called epibenthos, are aquatic animals that live on the bottom substratum as opposed to within it, that is, the benthic fauna that live on top of the sediment surface at the seafloor.

=== Infauna ===
This time-lapse movie shows images taken every hour during a two-week period. Worms, bacteria and fish are shown disturbing the sediment as they burrow and move through it.

Infauna are benthic organisms that live within the bottom substratum of a water body, especially within the bottom-most oceanic sediments, the layer of small particles at the bottom of a body of water, rather than on its surface. Bacteria and microalgae may also live in the interstices (small spaces between particles) of bottom sediments. In general, infaunal animals become progressively smaller and less abundant with increasing water depth and distance from shore, whereas bacteria show more constancy in abundance, tending toward one million cells per milliliter of interstitial seawater.

Such creatures are found in the fossil record and include lingulata, trilobites and worms. They made burrows in the sediment as protection and may also have fed upon detritus or the mat of microbes which tended to grow on the surface of the sediment. Today, a variety of organisms live in and disturb the sediment. The deepest burrowers are the ghost shrimps (Thalassinidea), which go as deep as 3 metres (10 ft) into the sediment at the bottom of the ocean.

=== Limnofauna ===
Limnofauna refers to the animals that live in fresh water.

=== Macrofauna ===
Macrofauna are benthic or soil organisms which are retained on a 0.5 mm sieve. Studies in the deep sea define macrofauna as animals retained on a 0.3 mm sieve to account for the small size of many of the taxa.

=== Megafauna ===
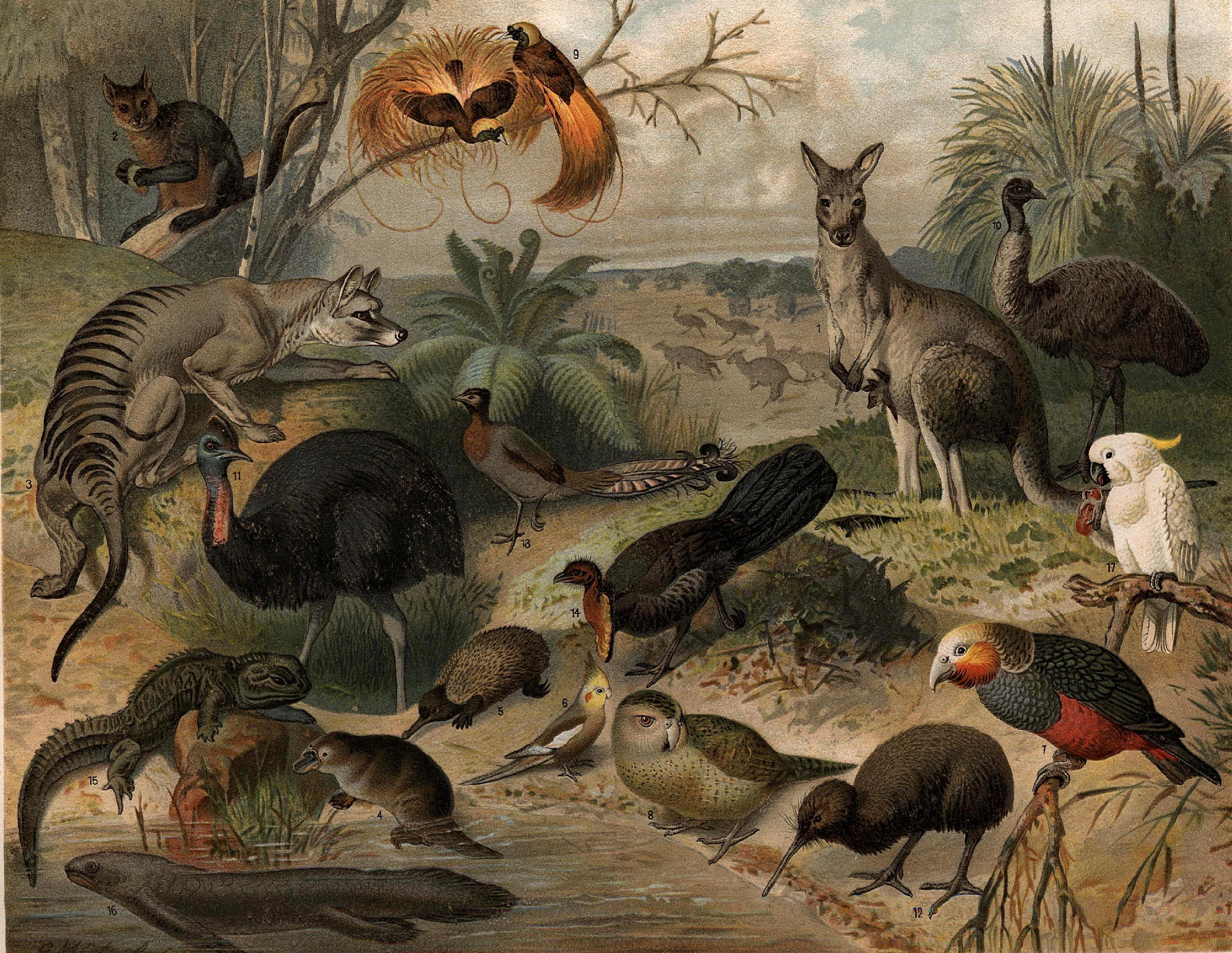
Papuan, Australian and New Zealand fauna. This image was likely first published in the first edition (1876–1899) of the Nordisk familjebok.

Megafauna are large animals of any particular region or time. For example, Australian megafauna.

=== Meiofauna ===
Meiofauna are small benthic invertebrates that live in both marine and freshwater environments. The term meiofauna loosely defines a group of organisms by their size, larger than microfauna but smaller than macrofauna, rather than a taxonomic grouping. One environment for meiofauna is between grains of damp sand (see Mystacocarida).

In practice these are metazoan animals that can pass unharmed through a 0.5–1 mm mesh but will be retained by a 30–45 μm mesh, but the exact dimensions will vary from researcher to researcher. Whether an organism passes through a 1 mm mesh also depends upon whether it is alive or dead at the time of sorting.

=== Mesofauna ===
Mesofauna are macroscopic soil animals such as arthropods or nematodes. Mesofauna are extremely diverse; considering just the springtails (Collembola), as of 1998, approximately 6,500 species had been identified.

=== Microfauna ===
Microfauna are microscopic or very small animals (usually including protozoans and very small animals such as rotifers). To qualify as part of the microfauna, an organism must exhibit animal-like characteristics, as opposed to microflora, which are more plant-like.

=== Stygofauna ===
Stygofauna is any fauna that lives in groundwater systems or aquifers, such as caves, fissures and vugs. Stygofauna and troglofauna are the two types of subterranean fauna (based on life-history). Both are associated with subterranean environments – stygofauna is associated with water, and troglofauna with caves and spaces above the water table. Stygofauna can live within freshwater aquifers and within the pore spaces of limestone, calcrete or laterite, whilst larger animals can be found in cave waters and wells. Stygofaunal animals, like troglofauna, are divided into three groups based on their life history - stygophiles, stygoxenes, and stygobites.

=== Troglofauna ===
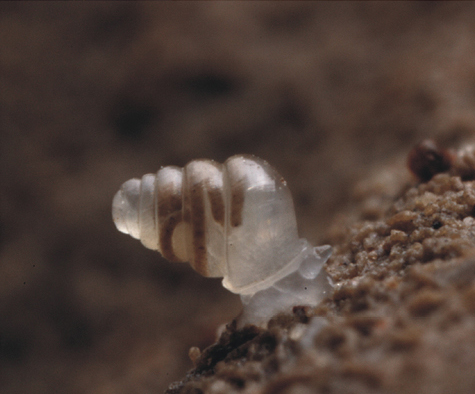
The microscopic cave snail Zospeum tholussum, found at depths of 743 to 1,392 m (2,438 to 4,567 ft) in the Lukina Jama–Trojama cave system of Croatia, is completely blind with a translucent shell

Troglofauna are small cave-dwelling animals that have adapted to their dark surroundings. Troglofauna and stygofauna are the two types of subterranean fauna (based on life-history). Both are associated with subterranean environments – troglofauna is associated with caves and spaces above the water table and stygofauna with water. Troglofaunal species include spiders, insects, myriapods and others. Some troglofauna lives permanently underground and cannot survive outside the cave environment. Troglofauna adaptations and characteristics include a heightened sense of hearing, touch and smell. Loss of under-used senses is apparent in the lack of pigmentation as well as eyesight in most troglofauna. Troglofauna insects may exhibit a lack of wings and longer appendages.

=== Xenofauna ===
Xenofauna, theoretically, are alien organisms that can be described as animal analogues. While no alien life forms, animal-like or otherwise, are known definitively, the concept of alien life remains a subject of great interest in fields such as astronomy, astrobiology, biochemistry, evolutionary biology, science fiction, and philosophy.

=== Other ===
Examples of fauna in Olleros de Tera (Spain)

Other terms include avifauna, which means "bird fauna" and piscifauna (or ichthyofauna), which means "fish fauna".

== Treatises ==
=== Classic faunas ===
- Linnaeus, Carolus. Fauna Suecica. 1746

== See also ==
- Biodiversity
- Biome
- Ecology
- Ecosystem
- Environmental movement
- Fauna and Flora Preservation Society
- Fauna of the Amazon rainforest
- Gene pool
- Genetic erosion
- Genetic pollution
- Natural environment
- Soil zoology
