= Olleros de Tera =

Locality in Castile and León, Spain

Coordinates: 41.9853°N 6.1009°W

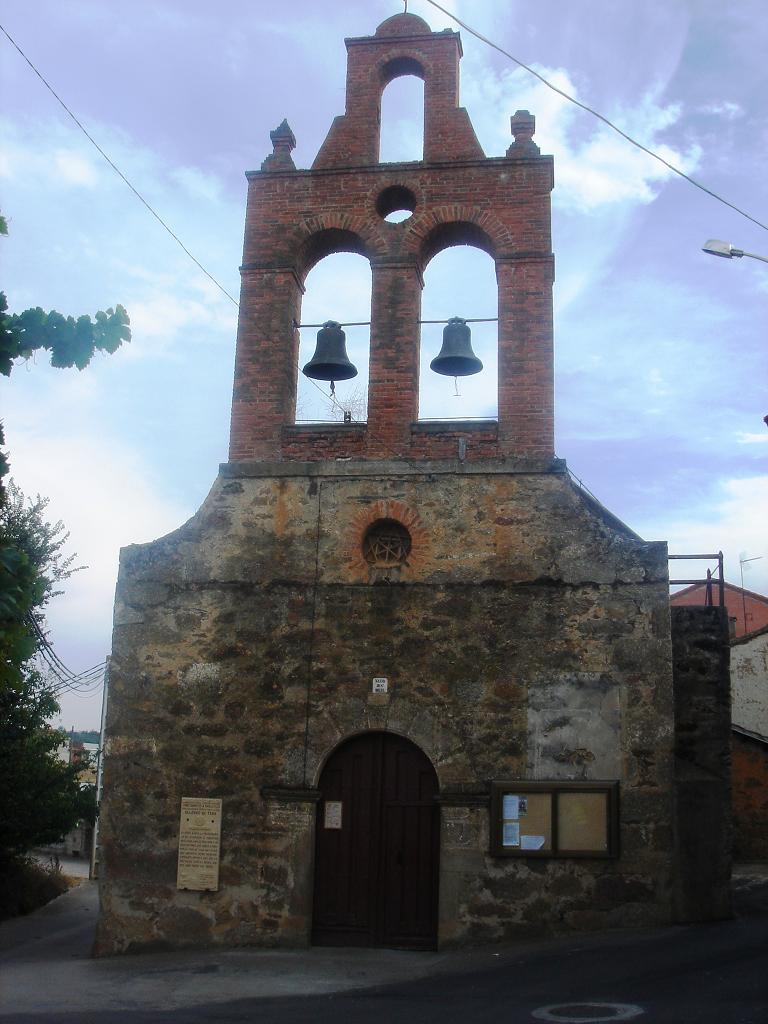
Iglesia de Olleros de Tera (Zamora)

Olleros de Tera is a locality in Calzadilla de Tera, Zamora province, Castile and León, Spain. As of 2014 it had a population of 179.
