= Pre-Columbian agriculture in the Amazon Basin =

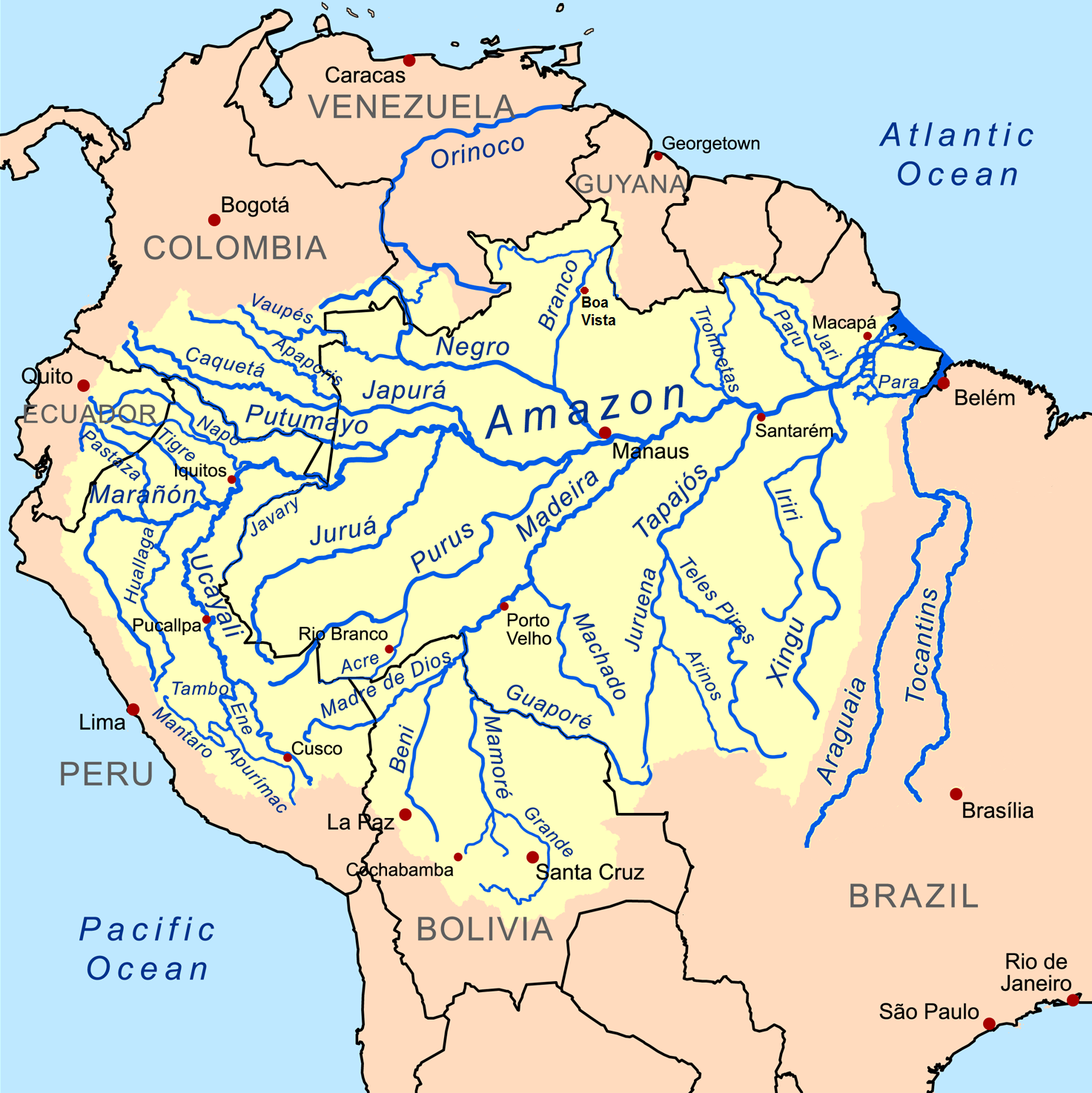
The Amazon river basin.

Pre-Columbian agriculture in the Amazon basin refers to the farming practices developed by the indigenous communities of the Amazon rainforest before the European conquest. Contrary to the common misconception of the pre-Columbian rainforest as a pristine wilderness untouched by human influence, agricultural communities in the Amazon Basin actively shaped and managed their environment prior to the arrival of European colonists. Eyewitness accounts by early Spanish and Portuguese explorers describe populous cities and flourishing agriculture. Population estimates for the pre-Columbian Amazon Basin range from a few million people to up to 10 million. After the population collapse following the European conquest, these communities were largely forgotten. Recent scientific research has helped to reconstruct the story of these lost settlements.

== Agriculture in the pre-Columbian period ==
The slow transition from small foraging and hunter/gathering groups to more advanced agricultural societies began over 10,000 years ago in the Amazon Basin, with the exact timing varying by sub-region. This evolved into more advanced farming systems with arboriculture as well as production of staple root and seed crops. These systems supported stable settlements with relatively large populations. Reports by early European explorers described large "well-fed populations along the bluffs, surrounded by orchards on the uplands and seasonal fields in the floodplains."

As elsewhere in the Americas, the European conquest brought the collapse of indigenous populations and their advanced agricultural systems were largely forgotten. Starting in roughly the year 2000, formal research projects (using molecular data, microfossil botanical techniques, remote sensing, and plant genetics) have resurrected the story of human settlement of the Amazon Basin – the Basin is no longer thought to have been a primeval forest at the time of European contact and can now be considered, along with Mesoamerica, as an "early and independent cradle of agriculture".

The principal features of these agricultural practices are as follows:

=== Forest and plant domestication ===
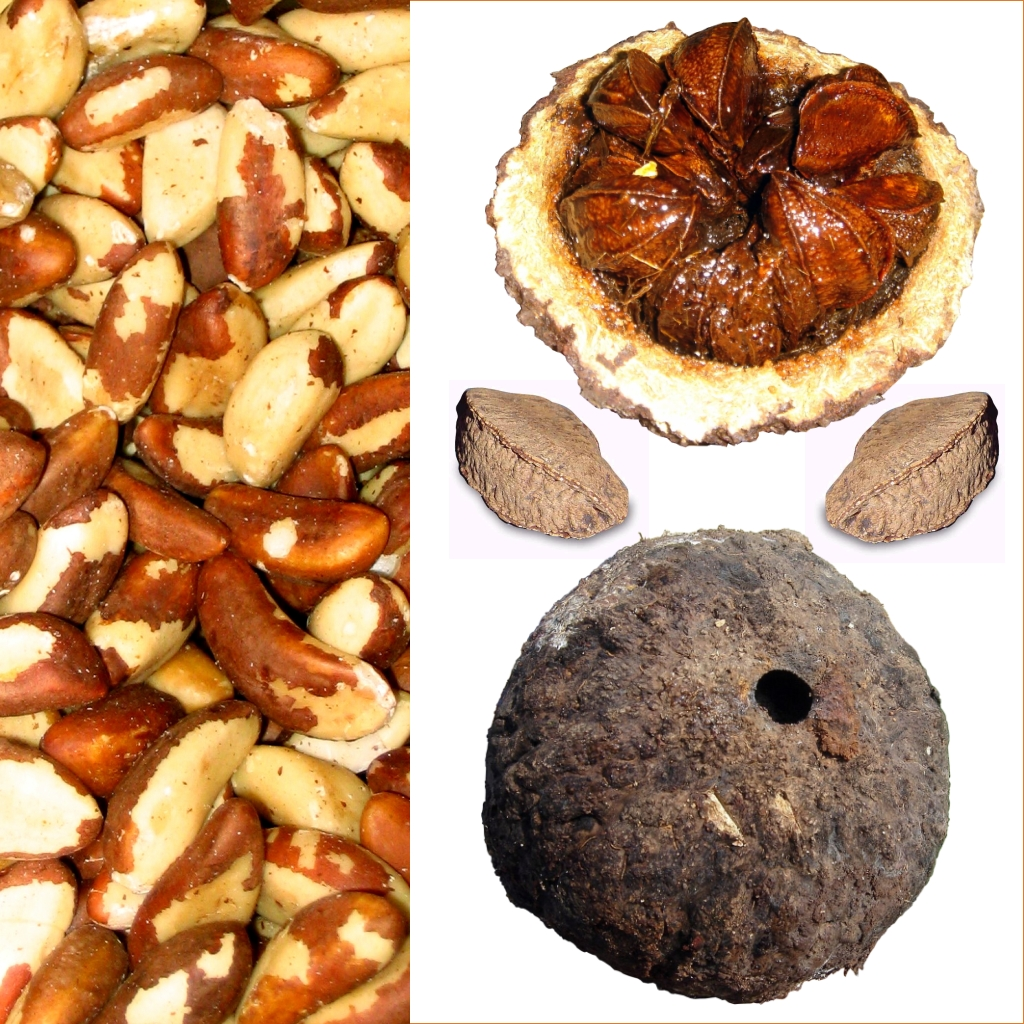
Brazil nuts: Shelled Brazil nuts on left; on upper right, a freshly cut Brazil nut fruit and 2 Brazil nut seeds in their shell; lower right, the Brazil nut capsule

By 15,000 years ago, human colonization had reached most of the western South American landmass. The earliest solid evidence of human presence in the tropical forests of eastern Brazil dates to about 13,000 years ago. By about 11,000 years ago, evidence points to longer term stays at fixed locations within the tropical forest – "people settled into their landscapes, staying for longer and/or more frequently returning to specific locations, and they frequently manipulated and altered their environments by creating clearings in forests and/or burning them."

Through diverse activities seeking to favor useful species, indigenous peoples engaged in 'forest domestication' that altered the plant composition of the Amazon Rainforest, permanently changing the distribution and density of useful tree species (e.g. Brazil nuts). The spatial pattern of this forest transformation radiated outward from human activity (which was concentrated on rivers), with spaces near settlements, campsites and trails undergoing more intensive change than remote spaces. Recent data for the region between the Purus and Madeira rivers indicates that the concentrations of useful species are detectable as much as 40km from major and even minor rivers.

Archeo-botanical evidence indicates that food cultivation began in South America between 11,000 and 7,600 years ago. The earliest crops were lerén (Goeppertia allouia) and arrowroot, but over time a more diverse array of plants were cultivated. Within this context of primitive agricultural practice, plant domestication is thought to have been a slow and gradual process. About 6,000 years ago, the transition from foraging and small-scale farming to larger scale and more sophisticated farming practice accelerated the process of plant domestication. In this context, plant domestication was rapid and diverse, making the Amazon a major source of domesticated plant species. Prior to European contact, domestication had influenced at least 83 plant species in pre-Columbian Amazon Basin, including cacao, hot peppers, manioc, pineapple, sweet potato and tobacco and "as well as numerous fruit trees and palms at least another 55 imported neo-tropical species."

=== Soil management ===
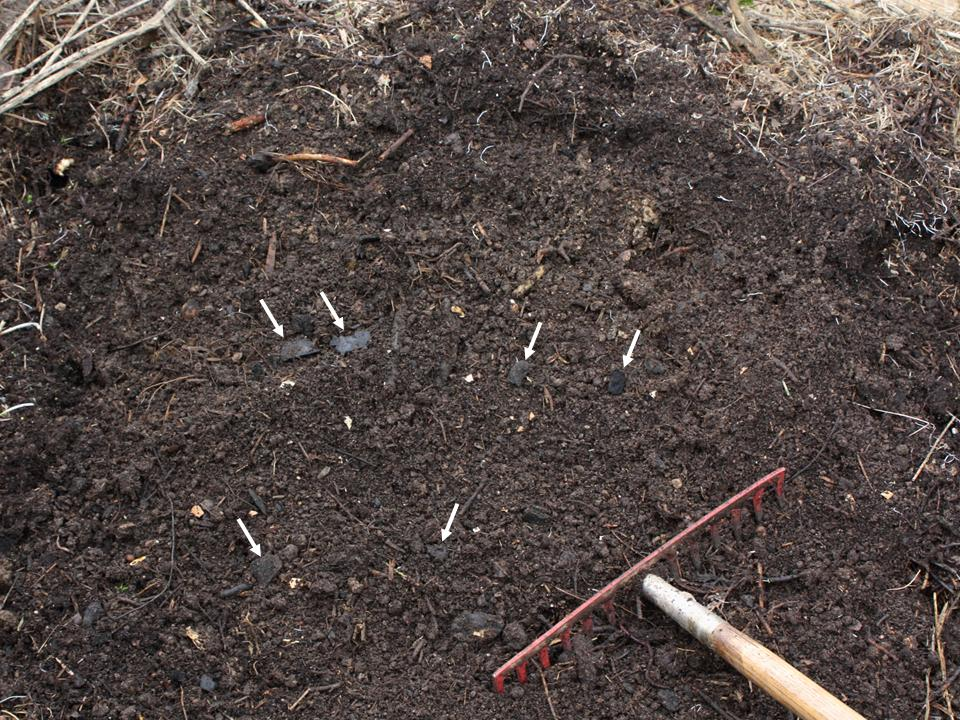
Homemade Terra Preta. Charcoal pieces are indicated with white arrows.

Amazonian soils are generally nutrient-poor in central and northwestern Amazon and are moderately rich in southwestern Amazon. Anthrosols are soils whose fertility has been enhanced by humans. Pre-Columbian settlements appear to have been active over the centuries in enhancing certain soils, which are now known as terra preta (dark earth in Portuguese), or Amazon Dark Earths (ADEs). These soils are relatively common in the Amazon Basin. However, scientists disagree on the relative roles of human intervention versus natural phenomena (e.g., flooding) in generating these soils. Some believe that they are largely human-made. Others believe that "indigenous people harnessed natural processes of landscape formation, which led to the unique properties of ADEs, but were not responsible for their genesis."

Terra preta contains microscopic charcoal particles in high concentrations (which gives the soil its distinctive black coloration) as well as pottery shards; organic matter such as plant residues; animal and human feces; and fish and animal bones. The soils were established close to and in indigenous settlements through activities including discarding of refuse, burning of vegetation, management of soil for crop cultivation. Thus, terra preta is hypothesised to have been formed over many years primarily or in part by the agricultural activities and refuse disposal, forming middens, by sedentary Amazonian peoples.

The durable presence of charcoal particles in the soil enhanced the soil's ability to retain nutrients essential for plant growth. The charcoal is stable and remains in the soil for thousands of years, binding and retaining minerals and other nutrients.

=== Agroforestry and intercropping ===
Pre-Columbian indigenous peoples practiced agroforestry, which combined tree cultivation with other crops. This approach created a diverse ecosystem that offered both food and other resources, such as timber, fibers, and medicinal plants. Intercropping, or the cultivation of multiple crops within the same plot, was another practice used to maximize resources and yield. According to one study, lake and terrestrial fossil records from the pre-Columbian eastern Amazon show an abrupt enrichment of edible forest species. The study indicates that, about 4,500 years ago, pre-Columbians adopted a "polyculture agroforestry subsistence strategy" that intensified with the development of ADE soils some 2,000 years ago. Over a period of several thousand years, crops were introduced, including, first, maize, sweet potato, cereals and tuber crops and, later, manioc. This combination of intercropping plus agroforestry is thought to have left a "modern enrichment of edible plants, demonstrating the important role of past indigenous land management in shaping modern forest ecosystems in the eastern Amazon."

=== Infrastructure and water management ===
Major pre-Columbian earthworks have been discovered, including ceremonial sites, fortified settlements, mounded ring villages and agricultural and transport infrastructure. Thanks to the development of remote sensing technology (and also due to deforestation), it has been possible to document the pre-Columbian period's extensive agricultural infrastructure. These include tens of thousands of raised agricultural beds, as well as hundreds of kilometers of causeways, roads and canals; artificial cuts between river meander bends; artificial ponds and fish weirs. In addition, many indigenous groups developed techniques for cultivating aquatic resources. They constructed raised fields and mounds in marshes and floodplains. These were designed to withstand or manage seasonal flooding and provided a consistent source of crops such as water chestnuts and arrowroot.

== Pre-Columbian population, population collapse and renewal of interest ==
Several Spanish and Portuguese explorers from the 16th and 17th century noted the flourishing communities along the Amazon and its tributaries. However, little historical documentation exists on the pre-Columbian population of the region and current estimates rely on estimation techniques that produce highly variable results: conservative estimates place the population at 1 or 2 million people, whereas the highest estimates fix it at between 8 and 10 million people. The arrival of European settlers brought about the collapse of these agricultural systems and the populations they supported — they would not survive the introduction of European diseases and forced labor, and pre-Columbian farming practices were largely forgotten.

Today, there is growing interest in expanding and preserving knowledge of pre-Columbian agricultural practices in the Amazon Basin (the nascent biochar industry is one example of this interest). Much of the region remains unexplored from this point of view. Indigenous communities, researchers, and environmentalists are working together to study, revive and adapt these methods to modern challenges such as deforestation, climate change, and food security.
