= Necrosol =

Soil type

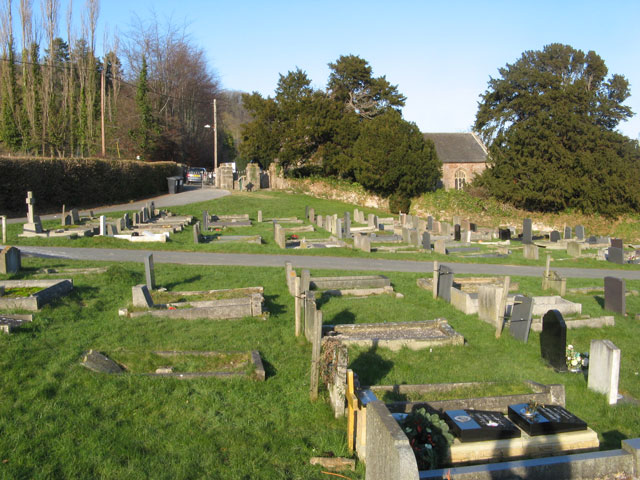
Location of a necrosol: a graveyard

A necrosol is a type of anthropogenic soil which is commonly found in cemeteries or other burial sites, and is characterized by the presence of human remains in the soil. The term necrosol was first introduced by Graf during his study of flora and vegetation at a cemetery in Berlin, Germany, in 1986.

Necrosols form during the interaction of the soil with human remains and other materials included in the burial, such as coffins, textiles and other human-made materials. This soil was included under urban soils in a classification system proposed by Burghardt in 1994, but are present in both urban and rural environments. Future research on Necrosols can support the field of archeology and enhance our understanding of past burial practices.

== Distribution ==
Necrosols are present across the globe, wherever humans have buried their dead. However, there is large variation in the natural soils which these soils developed on, based on climate, topography, time, parent material and vegetation, leading to heterogeneity among necrosols.

== Classification ==
Necrosols are compared to a “background” or “reference” soil, which is a soil near the site but outside the burial location. This provides a reference for the type of soil that would naturally occur at the study area, without human disturbance.

Necrosols are divided into two sub-groups: burial Necrosol and non-disturbed Necrosol.

- Burial Necrosols have undergone direct mechanical disturbance to the soil profile as a result of excavating soil to make space for human remains.
- Non-disturbed Necrosols are located in direct proximity to the burial site but have not undergone direct mechanical alteration from the burial, and therefore still have naturally occurring soil horizons.

== Composition ==
The addition of human remains and other materials change the soil horizon sequence of the original soil, and alter its physical, chemical and biological properties. Soil properties or formation will vary depending on the properties of the natural soil and what the burial process is, including burial depth, number of remains buried and proximity of remains to each other. These conditions are based on specific regulatory or cultural requirements, or major death events such as war, genocide or natural disasters which can result in mass graves.

Necrosol characteristics are also dependent on burial practices involving how the human remains are treated before deposited in the soil. For example, the deposit of cremated remains will result in fewer decomposition processes in soil compared to a process like traditional burial. Other burial procedures, like embalming or mummification, are designed to slow the body decomposition process of the remains.

Despite this variability, Necrosols have several shared diagnostic features that differentiate it from other soil types.

=== Mixed or disturbed horizons ===
In some Necrosols the natural soil horizons are absent due to disturbance as a result of the digging of graves in the soil profile. These natural horizons are mixed, and so the unique properties that characterize each horizon, like soil texture and organic matter content, will be dispersed throughout the different profiles. This feature is unique to, and what characterizes, the burial necrosols sub-group.

=== Presence of human remains and burial artifacts ===
These soils may also contain human remains and artifacts, which are materials in the soil that are created by humans such as materials from coffins, clothes or other belongings.

=== Higher organic carbon, phosphorus and nitrogen concentrations ===
All Necrosols contain high phosphorus, nitrogen and organic carbon. The higher levels of these nutrients compared to the natural soil nearby is due to the presence of human remains. The organic carbon, phosphorus, nitrogen and other nutrients are transferred into the soil as human remains decompose. Phosphorus is the most important soil indicator for classifying Necrosols, because it is least susceptible to change and leaching. High phosphorus concentrations come from the addition of human remains to the soil. This occurs through chemical weathering of soft tissue and bone in inhumation, or the addition of ash from cremation. In fact, the reports in 1815 from the Battle of Waterloo indicated that bones from the war, high in phosphorus, were taken from the site and ground up to use as fertilizer back in England.

=== Presence of toxics and heavy metals based on burial preparation ===
Depending on the burial procedure, human remains and artifacts may bring the addition of certain chemicals to the soil. This includes higher concentrations of heavy metals which come from paints or metals on artifacts like coffins. Additionally, chemicals used on human remains during burial processes, like formaldehyde, may be present in the soils within the first 14 weeks of burial.
