= Forest island =

Isolated strand of tropical forest on the Amazonian savanna

A forest island is an atypical isolated strand of tropical forest on the Amazonian savanna. Their origin is largely unknown. One hypothesis suggests anthropomorphic origins, those forest islands being earlier human farming of diverse useful, food-producing tropical plants and trees, collected and willfully inserted in suitable points of the grassland.

== Characteristics ==
Forest islands are found in between the Andes and the Amazonia forest, in large, rather flat grassland areas with savannah vegetation as the dominant biological feature. These plains are irrigated by yearly Spring melting of Andes snow cover. Within this grassland landscape, thousands of tree-covered mounds are known, standing above the nearby grasslands. Forest islands are typically described as raised, wooded areas of about 70 meters in diameter.

== Origin ==
These atypical mounts were first assumed to be the differential results of modern extensive animal farming on surrounding grasslands, loosening soil materials each year during recent centuries, while those tropical forest islands retained their initial elevation.

The ability of local Amazonia inhabitants to engineer their forest ecosystem has been previously defended. Darrell Posey, among the Gorotire Kayaps Indians of the Brazilian Amazon, described wilful, astute engineering of the forest. Defecations along circulation lines as well as active collection and spread of beneficial plants to increase future generation harvests and repel pests are documented. Others argue for other materials, such as termite nests, being used as fertilizer.

Lombardo & et al. identified over 6600 forest islands in their target area of Llanos de Moxos. On examining 82 of those mounts, 60 shown visible traces of human occupation. Radiocarbon dating returns human occupation from as far as 10,850 years ago. It is now believed that the raised areas are the result of thousands of years of accumulation of biological wastes. As the deposits of soil grew, trees eventually occupied the raised areas.

== Implications ==
Lombardo's dating of early forest islands to over 10,000 years ago puts South West Amazonia among early adopters of agriculture, together with the Middle East, China, south-west Mexico and north-west South America. Lombardo study shows the oldest evidence for squash and maize cultivation from human activity in the Amazon basin. It also changed the view about historical human impact on the Amazonia. Although this impact was previously thought to be minimal, Lombardo's study and dating shows over 10,000 years of extensive forestry engineering in this marginal area of Amazonia.

Posey argued for the apêtê, or forest islands, composed of useful plant species, to be used as a viable locally-based model for reforestation of Amazonia.

== See also ==
- Forest gardening
- Forest farming
- Pekarangan
- Hügelkultur
- Terra preta
