= Slash-and-char =

Farming method for clearing vegetation

Slash-and-char is an alternative to slash-and-burn that has a lesser effect on the environment. It is the practice of charring the biomass resulting from the slashing instead of burning it. Due to incomplete combustion (pyrolysis) the resulting residue matter charcoal can be utilized as biochar to improve the soil fertility.

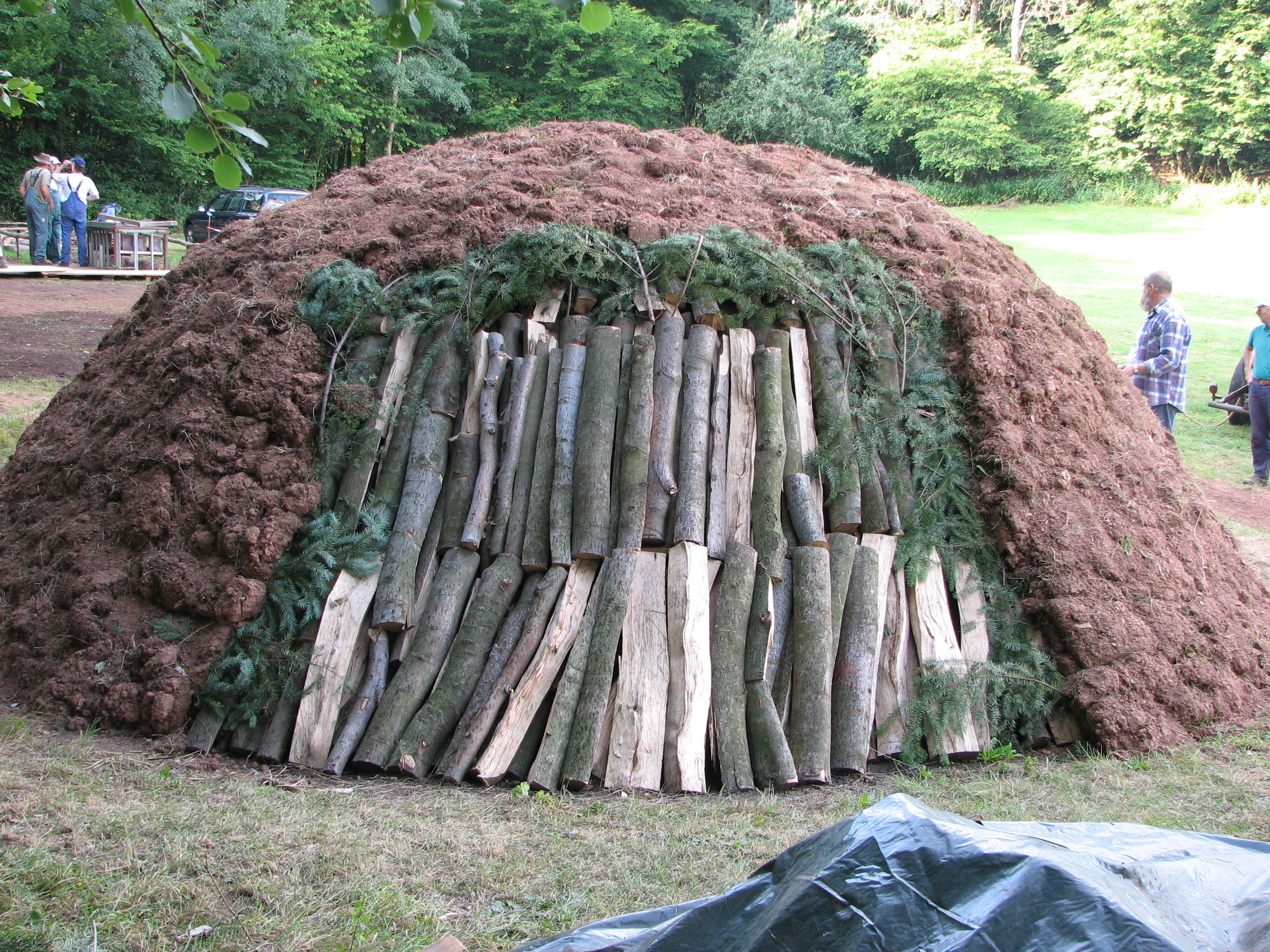
Charcoal production under an earth cover

In that context, charcoal can be made using numerous and varied methods. The simplest, used historically in charcoal production, involves burning a pile of biomass by lighting it on the top (known as "top down burn" or "conservation burn") or an earth cover on the pile of wood, with strategically placed vents. A more sophisticated modern method involves equipment that recuperates and processes strictly all exhaust gases into pyroligneous acid and syngas.

Slash-and-char offers benefits to the environment when compared to slash-and-burn.

It results in the creation of biochar, which can then be mixed with biomass such as crop residues, food waste, or manure and buried in the soil to bring about the formation of terra preta. Terra preta is one of the richest soils on the planet – and the only one known to regenerate itself.

It moreover sequesters considerable quantities of carbon safely and beneficially, as opposed to the adverse effects of the slash-and-burn. Switching to slash-and-char can sequester up to 50% of the carbon in a highly stable form. The nascent carbon trading market that sponsors CO_{2} sequestration projects could therefore help supplement the farmers' income while supporting a decrease in the pace of deforestation and the development of a more sustainable agriculture.

== See also ==
- Biomass, explaining some of these methods and advantages.
