= Terra preta =

Very dark, fertile Amazonian anthropogenic soil

Terra preta (Portuguese pronunciation: [ˈtɛʁɐ ˈpɾetɐ], literally "black earth" in Portuguese), also known as Amazonian dark earth or Indian black earth, is a type of very dark, fertile anthropogenic soil (anthrosol) found in the Amazon Basin. In Portuguese its full name is terra preta do índio or terra preta de índio ("black soil of the Indian", "Indians' black earth"). Terra mulata ("mulatto earth") is lighter or brownish in color.

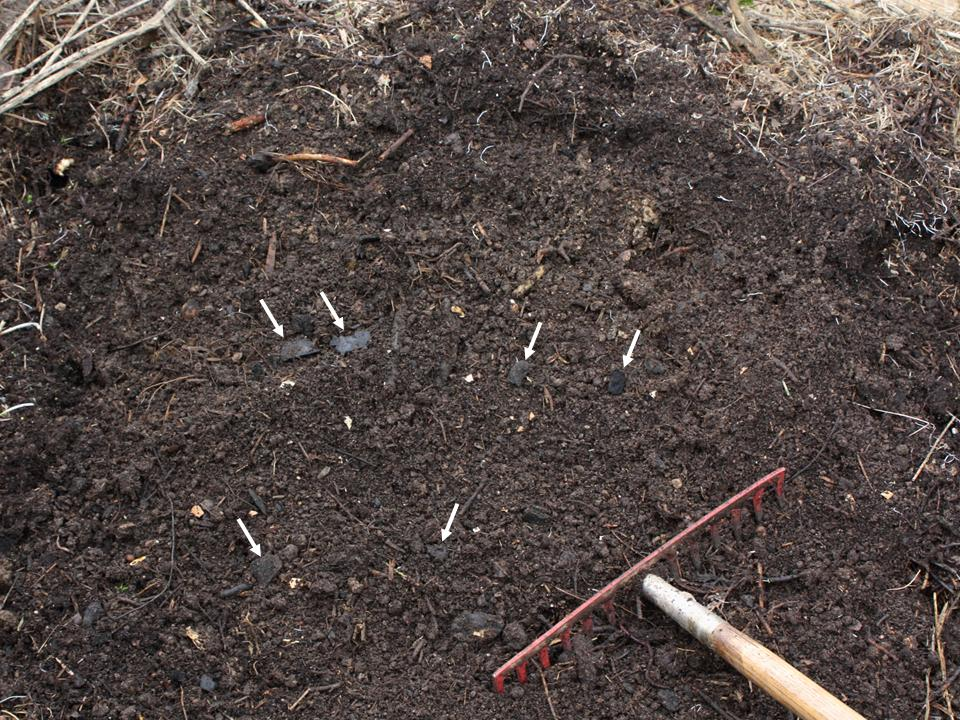
Homemade terra preta, with charcoal pieces indicated by white arrows

Terra preta owes its characteristic black color to its weathered charcoal content, and was made by adding a mixture of charcoal, bones, broken pottery, compost and manure to the low fertility Amazonian soil. A product of indigenous Amazonian soil management and slash-and-char agriculture, the charcoal is stable and remains in the soil for thousands of years, binding and retaining minerals and nutrients.

Terra preta is characterized by the presence of low-temperature charcoal residues in high concentrations; of high quantities of tiny pottery shards; of organic matter such as plant residues, animal feces, fish and animal bones, and other material; and of nutrients such as nitrogen, phosphorus, calcium, zinc and manganese. Fertile soils such as terra preta show high levels of microorganic activities and other specific characteristics within particular ecosystems.

Terra preta zones are generally surrounded by terra comum ([ˈtɛʁɐ koˈmũ, ku-]), or "common soil"; these are infertile soils, mainly acrisols, but also ferralsols and arenosols. Deforested arable soils in the Amazon are productive for a short period of time before their nutrients are consumed or leached away by rain or flooding. This forces farmers to migrate to an unburned area and clear it (by fire). Terra preta is less prone to nutrient leaching because of its high concentration of charcoal, microbial life and organic matter. The combination accumulates nutrients, minerals and microorganisms and withstands leaching.

Terra preta soils were created by the pre-Columbian farming communities between 450 BCE and 950 CE. Soil depths can reach 2 meters (6.6 ft). It is reported to regenerate itself at the rate of 1 centimeter (0.4 in) per year.

== History ==
=== Early theories ===
The origins of the Amazonian dark earths were not immediately clear to later settlers. One idea was that they resulted from ashfall from volcanoes in the Andes, since they occur more frequently on the brows of higher terraces. Another theory considered its formation to be a result of sedimentation in tertiary lakes or in recent ponds.

=== Anthropogenic roots ===
Soils with elevated charcoal content and a common presence of pottery remains can accrete accidentally near living quarters as residues from food preparation, cooking fires, animal and fish bones, broken pottery, etc., accumulated. Many terra preta soil structures are now thought to have formed under kitchen middens, as well as being manufactured intentionally on larger scales. Farmed areas around living areas are referred to as terra mulata. Terra mulata soils are more fertile than surrounding soils but less fertile than terra preta, and were most likely intentionally improved using charcoal.

This type of soil appeared between 450 BCE and 950 CE at sites throughout the Amazon Basin. Recent research has reported that terra preta may be of natural origin, suggesting that pre-Columbian people intentionally utilized and improved existing areas of soil fertility scattered among areas of lower fertility.

=== Amazonia ===
Amazonians formed complex, large-scale social formations, including chiefdoms (particularly in the inter-fluvial regions) and even large towns and cities. For instance, the culture on the island of Marajó may have developed social stratification and supported a population of 100,000. Amazonians may have used terra preta to make the land suitable for large-scale agriculture.

Spanish explorer Francisco de Orellana was the first European to traverse the Amazon River in the 16th century. He reported densely populated regions extending hundreds of kilometres along the river, suggesting population levels exceeding even those of today. Orellana may have exaggerated the level of development, although that is disputed. The evidence to support his claim comes from the discovery of geoglyphs dating between 0–1250 CE and from terra preta. Beyond the geoglyphs, these populations left no lasting monuments, possibly because they built with wood, which would have rotted in the humid climate, as stone was unavailable.

Whatever its extent, this civilization vanished after the demographic collapse of the 16th and 17th centuries, due to European-introduced diseases such as smallpox and bandeirante slave-raiding. The settled agrarians again became nomads, while still maintaining specific traditions of their settled forebears. Their semi-nomadic descendants have the distinction among tribal indigenous societies of a hereditary, yet landless, aristocracy, a historical anomaly for a society without a sedentary, agrarian culture.

Moreover, many indigenous peoples adapted to a more mobile lifestyle to escape colonialism. This might have made the benefits of terra preta, such as its self-renewing capacity, less attractive: farmers would not have been able to cultivate the renewed soil as they migrated. Slash-and-char agriculture may have been an adaptation to these conditions. For 350 years after the European arrival, the Portuguese portion of the basin remained untended.

== Location ==
Terra preta soils are found mainly in the Brazilian Amazon, where Sombroek et al. estimate that they cover at least 0.1–0.3%, or 6,300 to 18,900 square kilometres (2,400 to 7,300 sq mi) of low forested Amazonia; but others estimate this surface at 10.0% or more (twice the area of Great Britain). Recent model-based predictions suggest that the extent of terra preta soils may be of 3.2% of the forest.

Terra preta exists in small plots averaging 20 hectares (49 acres), but areas of almost 360 hectares (890 acres) have also been reported. They are found among various climatic, geological, and topographical situations. Their distributions either follow main water courses, from East Amazonia to the central basin, or are located on interfluvial sites (mainly of circular or lenticular shape) and of a smaller size averaging some 1.4 hectares (3.5 acres) (see distribution map of terra preta sites in Amazon basin). The spreads of tropical forest between the savannas could be mainly anthropogenic—a notion with dramatic implications worldwide for agriculture and conservation.

Terra preta sites are also known in the Llanos de Moxos of Bolivia, Ecuador, Peru and French Guiana, and on the African continent in Benin, Liberia, and the South African savannas.

== Pedology ==
In the international soil classification system World Reference Base for Soil Resources (WRB) Terra preta is called Pretic Anthrosol. The most common original soil before transformed into a terra preta is the Ferralsol. Terra preta has a carbon content ranging from high to very high (more than 13–14% organic matter) in its A horizon, but without hydromorphic characteristics. Terra preta presents important variants. For instance, gardens close to dwellings received more nutrients than fields farther away. The variations in Amazonian dark earths prevent clearly determining whether all of them were intentionally created for soil improvement or whether the lightest variants are a by-product of habitation.

Terra preta's capacity to increase its own volume—thus to sequester more carbon—was first documented by pedologist William I. Woods of the University of Kansas. This remains the central mystery of terra preta.

The processes responsible for the formation of terra preta soils are:

- Incorporation of wood charcoal
- Incorporation of organic matter and of nutrients
- Growth of microorganisms and animals in the soil

=== Wood charcoal ===
The transformation of biomass into charcoal produces a series of charcoal derivatives known as pyrogenic or black carbon, the composition of which varies from lightly charred organic matter, to soot particles rich in graphite formed by recomposition of free radicals. All types of carbonized materials are called charcoal. By convention, charcoal is considered to be any natural organic matter transformed thermally or by a dehydration reaction with an oxygen/carbon (O/C) ratio less than 60; smaller values have been suggested. Because of possible interactions with minerals and organic matter from the soil, it is almost impossible to identify charcoal by determining only the proportion of O/C. The hydrogen/carbon percentage or molecular markers such as benzenepolycarboxylic acid, are used as a second level of identification.

Indigenous people added low temperature charcoal to poor soils. Up to 9% black carbon has been measured in some terra preta (against 0.5% in surrounding soils). Other measurements found carbon levels 70 times greater than in surrounding ferralsols, with approximate average values of 50 Mg/ha/m.

The chemical structure of charcoal in terra preta soils is characterized by poly-condensed aromatic groups that provide prolonged biological and chemical stability against microbial degradation; it also provides, after partial oxidation, the highest nutrient retention. Low temperature charcoal (but not that from grasses or high cellulose materials) has an internal layer of biological petroleum condensates that the bacteria consume, and is similar to cellulose in its effects on microbial growth. Charring at high temperature consumes that layer and brings little increase in soil fertility. The formation of condensed aromatic structures depends on the method of manufacture of charcoal. The slow oxidation of charcoal creates carboxylic groups; these increase the cation exchange capacity of the soil. The nucleus of black carbon particles produced by the biomass remains aromatic even after thousands of years and presents the spectral characteristics of fresh charcoal. Around that nucleus and on the surface of the black carbon particles are higher proportions of forms of carboxylic and phenolic carbons spatially and structurally distinct from the particle's nucleus. Analysis of the groups of molecules provides evidences both for the oxidation of the black carbon particle itself, as well as for the adsorption of non-black carbon.

This charcoal is thus decisive for the sustainability of terra preta. Amending ferralsol with wood charcoal greatly increases productivity. Globally, agricultural lands have lost on average 50% of their carbon due to intensive cultivation and other damage of human origin.

Fresh charcoal must be "charged with nutrients" before it can function as a biotope. Several experiments demonstrate that uncharged charcoal can bring a temporary depletion of available nutrients when first put into the soil, that is until its pores fill with nutrients. This is overcome by soaking the charcoal for two to four weeks in any liquid nutrient (urine, plant tea, worm tea, etc.).

=== Organic matter and nutrients ===
Charcoal's porosity brings better retention of organic matter, of water and of dissolved nutrients, as well as of pollutants such as pesticides and aromatic poly-cyclic hydrocarbons.

==== Organic matter ====
Charcoal's high absorption potential of organic molecules (and of water) is due to its porous structure. Terra preta's high concentration of charcoal supports a high concentration of organic matter (on average three times more than in the surrounding poor soils), up to 150 g/kg. Organic matter can be found at 1 to 2 metres (3 ft 3 in to 6 ft 7 in) deep.

Bechtold proposes to use terra preta for soils that show, at 50 centimeters (20 in) depth, a minimum proportion of organic matter over 2.0–2.5%. The accumulation of organic matter in moist tropical soils is a paradox, because of optimum conditions for organic matter degradation. It is remarkable that anthrosols regenerate in spite of these tropical conditions' prevalence and their fast mineralisation rates. The stability of organic matter is mainly because the biomass is only partially consumed.

==== Nutrients ====
Terra preta soils also show higher quantities of nutrients, and a better retention of these nutrients, than surrounding infertile soils. The proportion of P reaches 200–400 mg/kg. The quantity of N is also higher in anthrosol, but that nutrient is immobilized because of the high proportion of C over N in the soil.

Anthrosol's availability of P, Ca, Mn and Zn is higher than ferralsol. The absorption of P, K, Ca, Zn, and Cu by the plants increases when the quantity of available charcoal increases. The production of biomass for two crops (rice and Vigna unguiculata) increased by 38–45% without fertilization (P < 0.05), compared to crops on fertilized ferralsol.

Amending with charcoal pieces approximately 20 millimeters (0.79 in) in diameter, instead of ground charcoal, did not change the results except for manganese (Mn), for which absorption considerably increased.

Nutrient leaching is minimal in this anthrosol, despite their abundance, resulting in high fertility. When inorganic nutrients are applied to the soil, however, the nutrients' drainage in anthrosol exceeds that in fertilized ferralsol.

As potential sources of nutrients, only C (via photosynthesis) and N (from biological fixation) can be produced in situ. All the other elements (P, K, Ca, Mg, etc.) must be present in the soil. In Amazonia, the provisioning of nutrients from the decomposition of naturally available organic matter fails as the heavy rainfalls wash away the released nutrients and the natural soils (ferralsols, acrisols, lixisols, arenosols, uxisols, etc.) lack the mineral matter to provide those nutrients. The clay matter that exists in those soils is capable of holding only a small fraction of the nutrients made available from decomposition. In the case of terra preta, the only possible nutrient sources are primary and secondary. The following components have been found:

- Human and animal excrements (rich in P and N);
- Kitchen refuse, such as animal bones and tortoise shells (rich in P and Ca);
- Ash residue from incomplete combustion (rich in Ca, Mg, K, P and charcoal);
- Biomass of terrestrial plants (e.g. compost); and
- Biomass of aquatic plants (e.g. algae).

Saturation in pH and in base is more important than in the surrounding soils.

=== Microorganisms and animals ===
The peregrine earthworm Pontoscolex corethrurus (Oligochaeta: Glossoscolecidae) ingests charcoal and mixes it into a finely ground form with the mineral soil. P. corethrurus is widespread in Amazonia and notably in clearings after burning processes thanks to its tolerance of a low content of organic matter in the soil. This as an essential element in the generation of terra preta, associated with agronomic knowledge involving layering the charcoal in thin regular layers favorable to its burying by P. corethrurus.

Some ants are repelled from fresh terra preta; their density is found to be low about 10 days after production compared to that in control soils.

== Modern research on creating terra preta ==
=== Synthetic terra preta ===
A newly coined term is 'synthetic terra preta'. STP is a fertilizer consisting of materials thought to replicate the original materials, including crushed clay, blood and bone meal, manure and biochar is of particulate nature and capable of moving down the soil profile and improving soil fertility and carbon in the current soil peds and aggregates over a viable time frame. Such a mixture provides multiple soil improvements reaching at least the quality of terra mulata. Blood, bone meal and chicken manure are useful for short term organic manure addition. Perhaps the most important and unique part of the improvement of soil fertility is carbon, thought to have been gradually incorporated 4 to 10 thousand years ago. Biochar is capable of decreasing soil acidity and if soaked in nutrient rich liquid can slowly release nutrients and provide habitat for microbes in soil due to its high porosity surface area.

The goal is an economically viable process that could be included in modern agriculture. Average poor tropical soils are easily enrichable to terra preta nova by the addition of charcoal and condensed smoke. Terra preta may be an important avenue of future carbon sequestration while reversing the current worldwide decline in soil fertility and associated desertification. Whether this is possible on a larger scale has yet to be proven. Tree Lucerne (tagasaste or Cytisus proliferus) is one type of fertilizer tree used to make terra preta. Efforts to recreate these soils are underway by companies such as Embrapa and other organizations in Brazil. A growing number of startups offer to scale biochar production in the Global South via the sale of carbon credits. Examples include Tanzanian startup Dark Earth Carbon (DEC), which is supported through the UK Foreign, Commonwealth & Development Office's Green Growth Facility (International Climate Finance). A growing number of active initiatives around the world are marketing biochar projects and carbon credits.

Synthetic terra preta is produced at the Sachamama Center for Biocultural Regeneration in High Amazon, Peru. This area has many terra preta soil zones, demonstrating that this anthrosol was created not only in the Amazon basin, but also at higher elevations.

A synthetic terra preta process was developed by Alfons-Eduard Krieger to produce a high humus, nutrient-rich, water-adsorbing soil.

=== Terra preta sanitation ===
Terra preta sanitation (TPS) systems have been studied as an alternative sanitation option by using the effects of lactic-aid conditions in urine-diverting dry toilets and a subsequent treatment by vermicomposting.

== See also ==
- 1491: New Revelations of the Americas Before Columbus – 2005 non-fiction book by Charles C. Mann
- Agroforestry – Land use management system
- Belterra, Pará
- Forest islands – Isolated strand of tropical forest on the Amazonian savanna
- Pre-Columbian agriculture in the Amazon Basin
- Texas Blackland Prairies – Temperate grassland region of Texas, US
