= Calzadilla de Tera =

Coordinates: 41°59′N 6°05′W

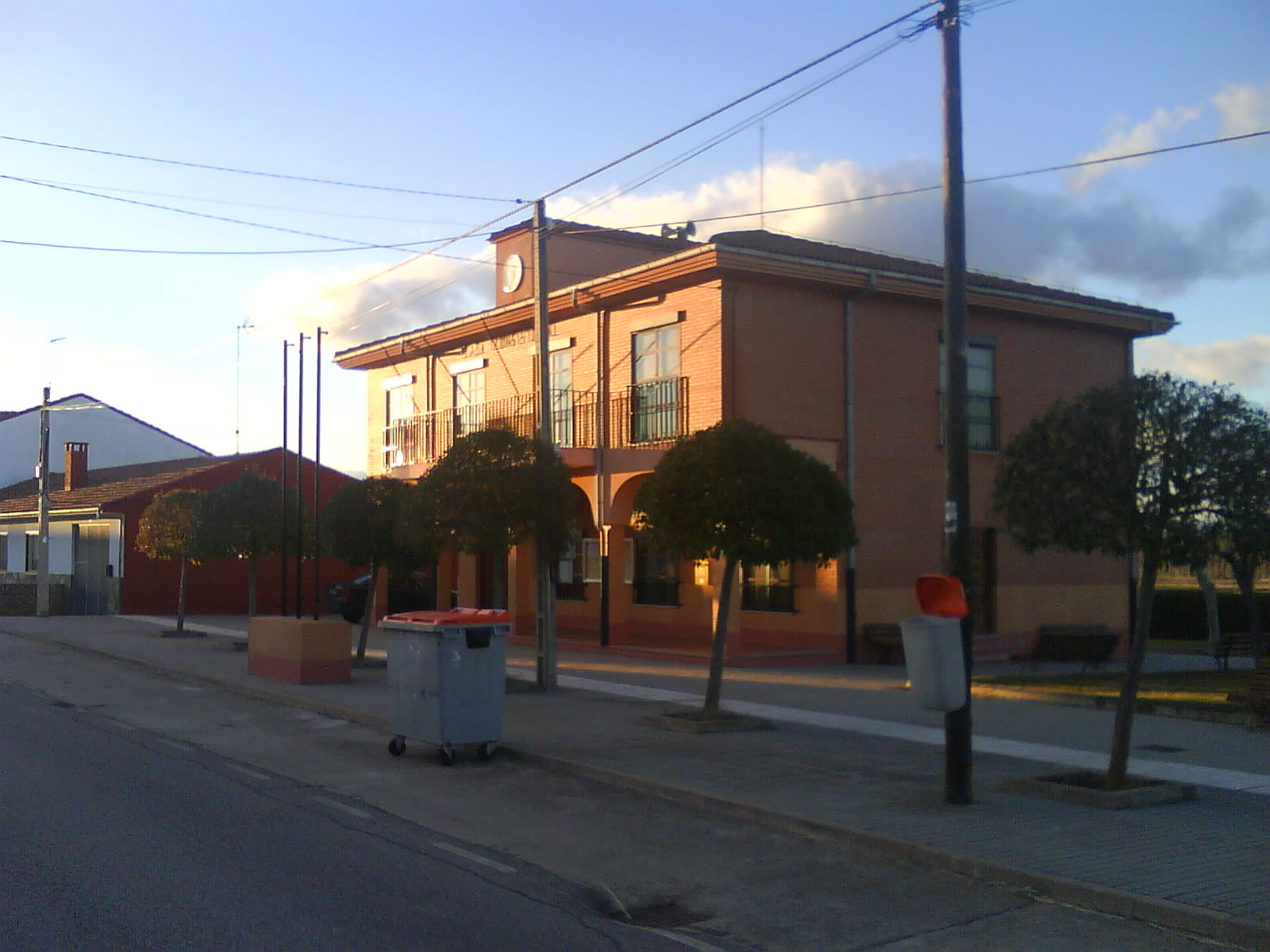
- Calzadilla de Tera town hall

- Flag Coat of arms
- Interactive map of Calzadilla de Tera
- Country: Spain
- Autonomous community: Castile and León
- Province: Zamora
- Municipality: Calzadilla de Tera

Area
  - Total: 27 km^{2} (10 sq mi)

Population (2025-01-01)
  - Total: 278
  - Density: 10/km^{2} (27/sq mi)
- Time zone: UTC+1 (CET)
  - Summer (DST): UTC+2 (CEST)
- Website: Official website

Calzadilla de Tera is a municipality located in the province of Zamora, Castile and León, Spain. According to the 2004 census (INE), the municipality has a population of 467 inhabitants.

The municipality is crossed by the route of the Roman Via XVII, from which it derives its name, and preserves a Roman milestone.
