= Solid sorbents for carbon capture =

Materials that absorb carbon dioxide

Solid sorbents for carbon capture include a diverse range of porous, solid-phase materials, including mesoporous silicas, zeolites, and metal-organic frameworks. These have the potential to function as more efficient alternatives to amine gas treating processes for selectively removing CO_{2} from large, stationary sources including power stations. While the technology readiness level of solid adsorbents for carbon capture varies between the research and demonstration levels, solid adsorbents have been demonstrated to be commercially viable for life-support and cryogenic distillation applications. While solid adsorbents suitable for carbon capture and storage are an active area of research within materials science, significant technological and policy obstacles limit the availability of such technologies.

== Overview ==
The combustion of fossil fuels generates over 13 gigatons of CO_{2} per year. Concern over the effects of CO_{2} with respect to climate change and ocean acidification led governments and industries to investigate the feasibility of technologies that capture the resultant CO_{2} from entering the carbon cycle. For new power plants, technologies such as pre-combustion and oxy-fuel combustion may simplify the gas separation process.

However, existing power plants require the post-combustion separation of CO_{2} from the flue gas with a scrubber. In such a system, fossil fuels are combusted with air and CO_{2} is selectively removed from a gas mixture also containing N_{2}, H_{2}O, O_{2} and trace sulphur, nitrogen and metal impurities. While exact separation conditions are fuel and technology dependent, in general CO_{2} is present at low concentrations (4-15% v/v) in gas mixtures near atmospheric pressure and at temperatures of approximately -60 °C. Sorbents for carbon capture are regenerated using temperature, pressure or vacuum, so that CO_{2} can be collected for sequestration or utilization and the sorbent can be reused.

The most significant impediment to carbon capture is the large amount of electricity required. Without policy or tax incentives, the production of electricity from such plants is not competitive with other energy sources. The largest operating cost for power plants with carbon capture is the reduction in the amount of electricity produced, because energy in the form of steam is diverted from making electricity in the turbines to regenerating the sorbent. Thus, minimizing the amount of energy required for sorbent regeneration is the primary goal behind much carbon capture research.

== Metrics ==
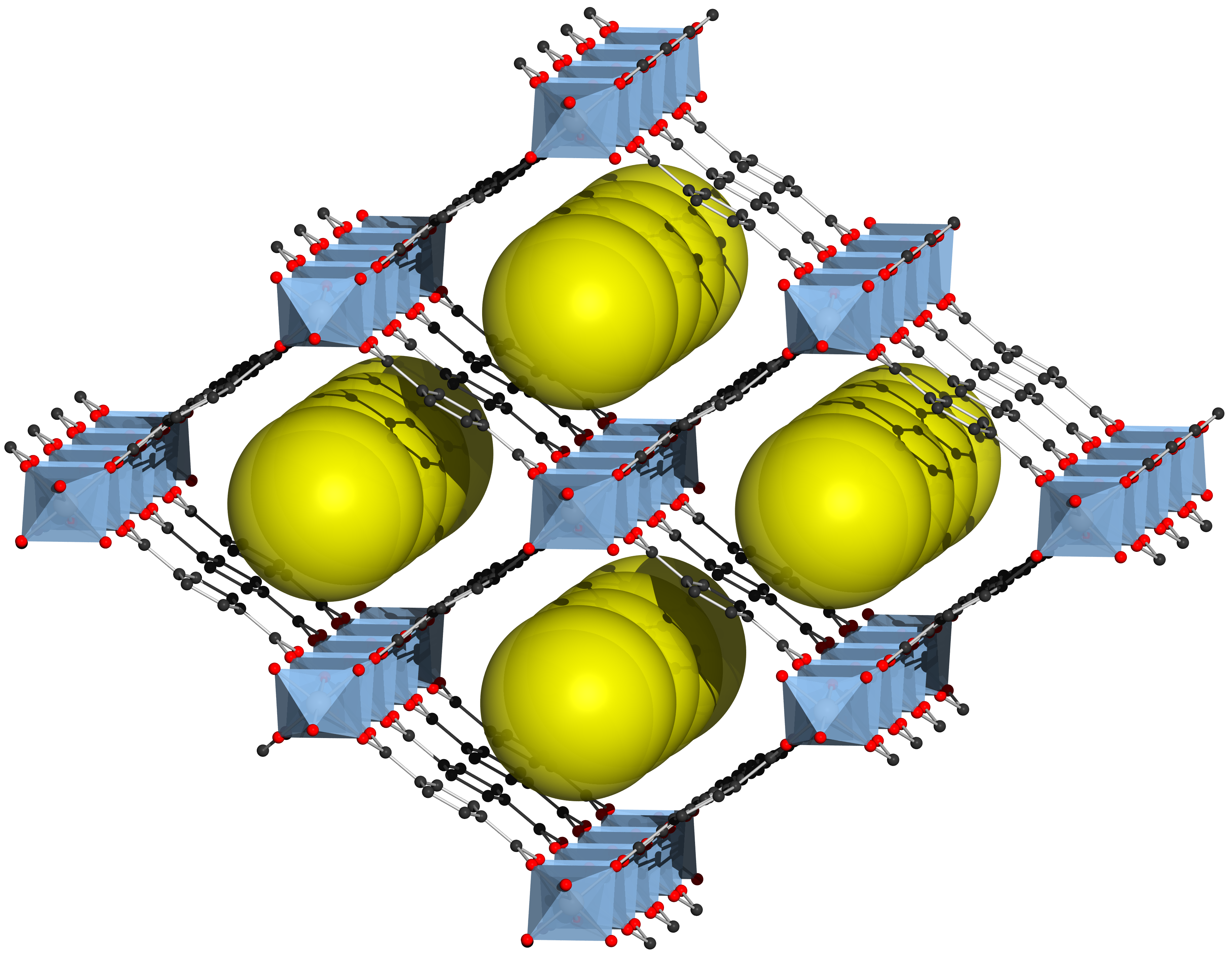
MIL-53 is a metal-organic framework which shows very strong selectivity for adsorbing CO_{2} into its pores (visualized as yellow spheres) from a mixture of CO_{2}/N_{2} when mechanical pressure is applied to influence the pore size aperture.

Significant uncertainty exists around the total cost of post-combustion CO_{2} capture because full-scale demonstrations of the technology have yet to come online. Thus, individual performance metrics are generally relied upon when comparisons are made between different adsorbents.

Regeneration energy—Generally expressed in energy consumed per weight of CO_{2} captured (e.g. 3,000 kJ/kg). These values, if calculated directly from the latent and sensible heat components of regeneration, measure the total amount of energy required for regeneration.

Parasitic energy—Similar to regeneration energy, but measures how much usable energy is lost. Owing to the imperfect thermal efficiency of power plants, not all of the heat required to regenerate the sorbent would actually have produced electricity.

Adsorption capacity—The amount of CO_{2} adsorbed onto the material under the relevant adsorption conditions.

Working capacity—The amount of CO_{2} that can be expected to be captured by a specified amount of adsorbent during one adsorption–desorption cycle. This value is generally more relevant than the total adsorption capacity.

Selectivity—The calculated ability of an adsorbent to preferentially adsorb one gas over another gas. Multiple methods of reporting selectivity have been reported and in general values from one method are not comparable to values from another method. Similarly, values are highly correlated to temperature and pressure.

== Comparison to aqueous amine absorbents ==
Aqueous amine solutions absorb CO_{2} via the reversible formation of ammonium carbamate, ammonium carbonate and ammonium bicarbonate. The formation of these species and their relative concentration in solution is dependent upon the specific amine or amines as well as the temperature and pressure of the gas mixture. At low temperatures, CO_{2} is preferentially absorbed by the amines and at high temperatures CO_{2} is desorbed. While liquid amine solutions have been used industrially to remove acid gases for nearly a century, amine scrubber technology is still under development at the scale required for carbon capture.

=== Advantages ===
Multiple advantages of solid sorbents have been reported. Unlike amines, solid sorbents can selectively adsorb CO_{2} without the formation of chemical bonds (physisorption). The significantly lower heat of adsorption for solids requires less energy for the CO_{2} to desorb from the material surface. Also, two primary or secondary amine molecules are generally required to absorb a single CO_{2} molecule in liquids. For solid surfaces, large capacities of CO_{2} can be adsorbed. For temperature swing adsorption processes, the lower heat capacity of solids has been reported to reduce the sensible energy required for sorbent regeneration. Many environmental concerns over liquid amines can be eliminated by the use of solid adsorbents.

=== Disadvantages ===
Manufacturing costs are expected to be significantly greater than the cost of simple amines. Because flue gas contains trace impurities that degrade sorbents, solid sorbents may prove to be prohibitively expensive. Significant engineering challenges must be overcome. Sensible energy required for sorbent regeneration cannot be effectively recovered if solids are used, offsetting their significant heat capacity savings. Additionally, heat transfer through a solid bed is slow and inefficient, making it difficult and expensive to cool the sorbent during adsorption and heat it during desorption. Lastly, many promising solid adsorbents have been measured only under ideal conditions, which ignores the potentially significant effects H_{2}O can have on working capacity and regeneration energy.

== Physical adsorbents ==
Carbon dioxide adsorbs in appreciable quantities onto many porous materials through van der Waals interactions. Compared to N_{2}, CO_{2} adsorbs more strongly because the molecule is more polarizabable and possesses a larger quadrupole moment. However, stronger adsorptives including H_{2}O often interfere with the physical adsorption mechanism. Thus, discovering porous materials that can selectively bind CO_{2} under flue gas conditions using only a physical adsorption mechanism is an active research area.

=== Zeolites ===
Zeolites, a class of porous aluminosilicate solids, are currently used in a wide variety of industrial and commercial applications including CO_{2} separation. The capacities and selectivities of many zeolites are among the highest for adsorbents that rely upon physisorption. For example, zeolite Ca-A (5A) has been reported to display both a high capacity and selectivity for CO_{2} over N_{2} under conditions relevant for carbon capture from coal flue gas, although it has not been tested in the presence of H_{2}O. Industrially, CO_{2} and H_{2}O can be co-adsorbed on a zeolite, but high temperatures and a dry gas stream are required to regenerate the sorbent.

=== Metal-organic frameworks ===
Metal-organic frameworks (MOFs) are promising adsorbents. Sorbents displaying a diverse set of properties have been reported. MOFs with extremely large surface areas are generally not among the best for CO_{2} capture compared to materials with at least one adsorption site that can polarize CO_{2}. For example, MOFs with open metal coordination sites function as Lewis acids and strongly polarize CO_{2}. Owing to CO_{2}'s greater polarizability and quadrupole moment, CO_{2} is preferentially adsorbed over many flue gas components such as N_{2}. However, flue gas contaminants such as H_{2}O often interfere. MOFs with specific pore sizes, tuned specifically to preferentially adsorb CO_{2} have been reported.

== Chemical adsorbents ==
=== Amine impregnated solids ===
Frequently, porous adsorbents with large surface areas, but only weak adsorption sites, lack sufficient capacity for CO_{2} under realistic conditions. To increase low pressure CO_{2} adsorption capacity, adding amine functional groups to highly porous materials has been reported to result in new adsorbents with higher capacities. This strategy has been analyzed for polymers, silicas, activated carbons and metal-organic frameworks. Amine impregnated solids utilize the well-established acid-base chemistry of CO_{2} with amines, but dilute the amines by containing them within the pores of solids rather than as H_{2}O solutions. Amine impregnated solids are reported to maintain their adsorption capacity and selectivity under humid test conditions better than alternatives. For example, a 2015 study of 15 solid adsorbent candidates for CO_{2} capture found that under multicomponent equilibrium adsorption conditions simulating humid flue gas, only adsorbents functionalized with alkylamines retained a significant capacity for CO_{2}.

== Notable adsorbents ==
Name	Type	0.15 bar Capacity (% weight)	Reference
PEI-MIL-101	Amine–MOF	17.7	
mmen-Mg_{2}(dobpdc)	Amine–MOF	13.7	
dmen-Mg_{2}(dobpdc)	Amine–MOF	13.3	
dmpn–Mg_{2}(dobpdc)	Amine–MOF	11.0	
mmen-CuBTTri	Amine–MOF	9.5	
NH_{2}-MIL-53(Al)	Amine–MOF	3.1	
en-CuBTTri	Amine–MOF	2.3	
Mg-MOF-74	MOF	20.6	
Ni-MOF-74	MOF	16.9	
Co-MOF-74	MOF	14.2	
HKUST-1	MOF	11.6	
SIFSIX-3(Zn)	MOF	10.7	
Zn(ox)(atz)_{2}	MOF	8.3	
Zn-MOF-74	MOF	7.6	
CuTATB-60	MOF	5.8	
bio-MOF-11	MOF	5.4	
FeBTT	MOF	5.3	
MOF-253-Cu(BF4)	MOF	4.0	
ZIF-78	MOF	3.3	
CuBTTri	MOF	2.9	
SNU-50	MOF	2.9	
USO-2-Ni-A	MOF	2.1	
MIL-53(Al)	MOF	1.7	
MIL-47	MOF	1.1	
UMCM-150	MOF	1.8	
MOF-253	MOF	1.0	
ZIF-100	MOF	1.0	
MTV-MOF-EHI	MOF	1.0	
ZIF-8	MOF	0.6	
IRMOF-3	MOF	0.6	
MOF-177	MOF	0.6	
UMCM-1	MOF	0.5	
MOF-5	MOF	0.5	
13X	Zeolite	15.3	
Ca-A	Zeolite	18.5	
