= Bioenergy with carbon capture and storage =

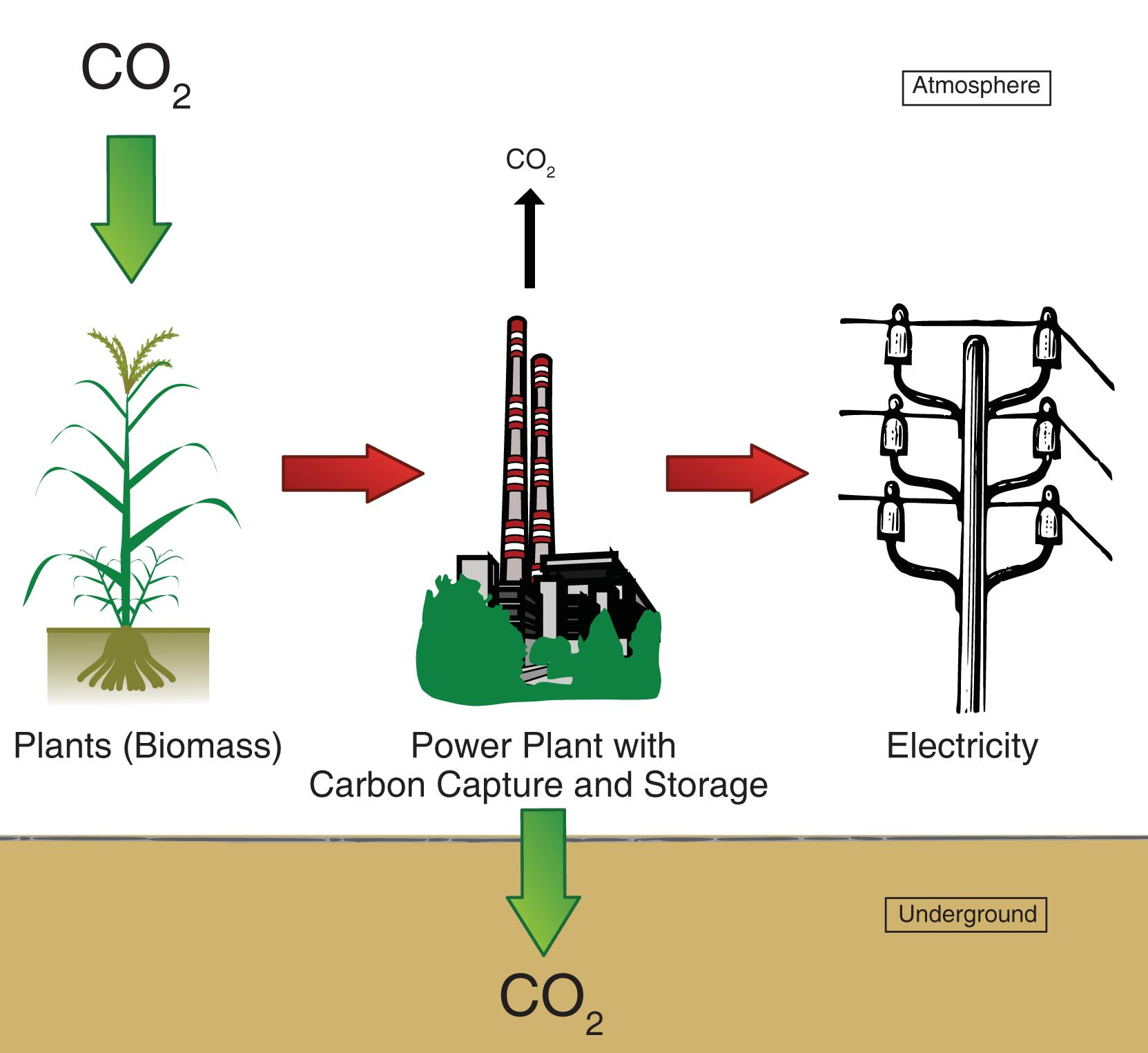
Example of BECCS: Diagram of bioenergy power plant with carbon capture and storage.

Bioenergy with carbon capture and storage (BECCS) is the process of extracting bioenergy from biomass and capturing and storing the carbon dioxide (CO_{2}) that is produced.

Greenhouse gas emissions from bioenergy can be low because when vegetation is harvested for bioenergy, new vegetation can grow that will absorb CO_{2} from the air through photosynthesis. After the biomass is harvested, energy ("bioenergy") is extracted in useful forms (electricity, heat, biofuels, etc.) as the biomass is utilized through combustion, fermentation, pyrolysis or other conversion methods. Using bioenergy releases CO_{2}. In BECCS, some of the CO_{2} is captured before it enters the atmosphere and stored underground using carbon capture and storage technology. Under some conditions, BECCS can remove carbon dioxide from the atmosphere.

The potential range of negative emissions from BECCS was estimated to be zero to 22 giga tonnes per year. As of 2024, there are large-scale 3 BECCS projects operating in the world. Wide deployment of BECCS is constrained by cost and availability of biomass. Since biomass production is land-intensive, deployment of BECCS can pose major risks to food production, human rights, and biodiversity.

== Negative emission ==
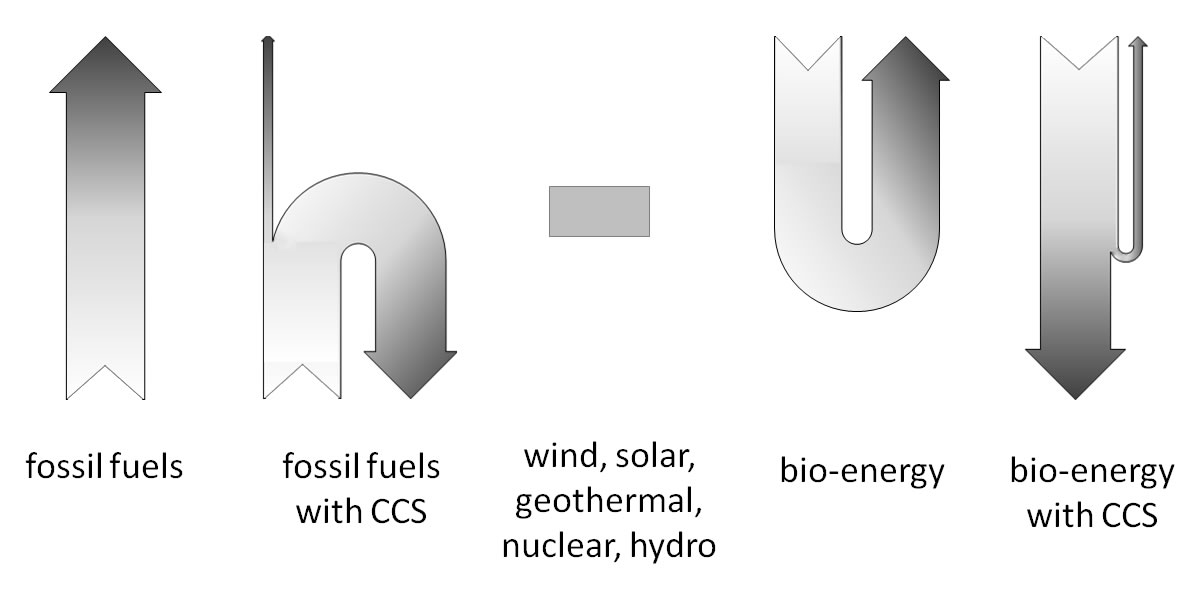
Carbon flow schematic for different energy systems.

The main appeal of BECCS is in its ability to result in negative emissions of CO_{2}. The capture of carbon dioxide from bioenergy sources effectively removes CO_{2} from the atmosphere.

Bioenergy is derived from biomass which is a renewable energy source and serves as a carbon sink during its growth. Carbon capture and storage (CCS) technology is to intercept the release of CO_{2} released from the combustion of biofuels and redirect it into semi-permanent storage locations such as geological storage locations or concrete. The result is a net removal of carbon dioxide from the atmosphere into sequestration sites. In practice, the net effects of sequestration can be reduced as a result of emissions from biomass transport, from energy use in the process, and from emissions from cultivation of biomass. Not all BECCS involves the capture of biogenic CO_{2} released from combustion. CO2 can also be capture from non-combustion biogenic sources such as the kraft pulping process or that is separated in the upgrading of biogas and ethanol.

BECCS technologies trap carbon dioxide in geologic formations in a semi-permanent way, allowing the cultivation of biomass to be used to capture carbon dioxide from the atmosphere. Duration of storage varies by the method used. Storage in natural reservoirs has a release fraction on the order of 10^{−7}/year while storage in depleted natural gas wells has a release fraction on the order of 10^{−4}-10^{−6}/year. In 2005, the IPCC estimated that BECCS technology would provide a "better permanence" by storing CO_{2} in geological formations underground, relative to other types of carbon sinks. Carbon sinks such as the ocean, trees, and soil involve a risk of adverse climate change feedback at increased temperature s.

Decreasing the concentration CO_{2} in the atmosphere through absorption by conventional sinks such as trees and soil alone will be to reach low emission targets. In addition to the presently accumulated emissions, there will be significant additional emissions during this century, even in the most ambitious low-emission scenarios. BECCS and Direct Air Carbon Capture are the only two methods of creating negative emissions that could reduce the concentration of carbon dioxide in the atmosphere. This implies that the emissions would not only be zero, but negative, so that not only the emissions, but the absolute amount of CO_{2} in the atmosphere would be reduced.

== Cost ==
Cost estimates for BECCS range from $60-$250 per ton of CO_{2}.

It was estimated that electrogeochemical methods of combining saline water electrolysis with mineral weathering powered by non-fossil fuel-derived electricity could, on average, increase both energy generation and CO_{2} removal by more than 50 times relative to BECCS, at equivalent or even lower cost, but further research is needed to develop such methods.

== Technology ==
The main technology for CO_{2} capture from biotic sources generally employs the same technology as carbon dioxide capture from conventional fossil fuel sources. Broadly, three different types of technologies exist: post-combustion, pre-combustion, and oxy-fuel combustion.

=== Oxy-combustion ===
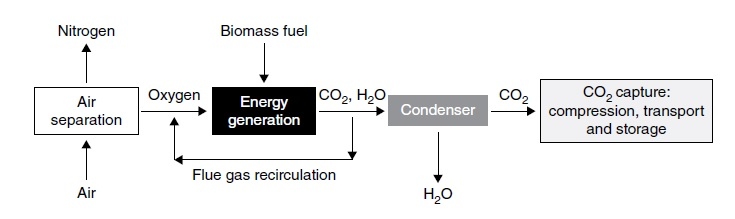
Overview of oxy-fuel combustion for carbon capture from biomass, showing the key processes and stages; some purification is also likely to be required at the dehydration stage.

Oxy-fuel combustion has been a common process in the glass, cement and steel industries. It is also a promising technological approach for CCS. In oxy-fuel combustion, the main difference from conventional air firing is that the fuel is burned in a mixture of O_{2} and recycled flue gas. The O_{2} is produced by an air separation unit (ASU), which removes the atmospheric N_{2} from the oxidizer stream. By removing the N_{2} upstream of the process, a flue gas with a high concentration of CO_{2} and water vapor is produced, which eliminates the need for a post-combustion capture plant. The water vapor can be removed by condensation, leaving a product stream of relatively high-purity CO_{2} which, after subsequent purification and dehydration, can be pumped to a geological storage site.

Key challenges of BECCS implementation using oxy-combustion are associated with the combustion process. For the high volatile content biomass, the mill temperature has to be kept at a low temperature to reduce the risk of fire and explosion. In addition, the flame temperature is lower. Therefore, the concentration of oxygen needs to be increased up to 27-30%.

=== Pre-combustion ===
"Pre-combustion carbon capture" describes processes that capture CO_{2} before generating energy. This is often accomplished in five operating stages: oxygen generation, syngas generation, CO_{2} separation, CO_{2} compression, and power generation. The fuel first goes through a gasification process by reacting with oxygen to form a stream of CO and H_{2}, which is syngas. The products will then go through a water-gas shift reactor to form CO_{2} and H_{2}. The CO_{2} that is produced will then be captured, and the H_{2}, which is a clean source, will be used for combustion to generate energy. The process of gasification combined with syngas production is called Integrated Gasification Combined Cycle (IGCC). An Air Separation Unit (ASU) can serve as the oxygen source, but some research has found that with the same flue gas, oxygen gasification is only slightly better than air gasification. Both have a thermal efficiency of roughly 70% using coal as the fuel source. Thus, the use of an ASU is not really necessary in pre-combustion.

Biomass is considered "sulfur-free" as a fuel for the pre-combustion capture. However, there are other trace elements in biomass combustion such as K and Na that could accumulate in the system and finally cause the degradation of the mechanical parts. Thus, further developments of the separation techniques for those trace elements are needed. And also, after the gasification process, CO_{2} takes up to 13% - 15.3% by mass in the syngas stream for biomass sources, while it is only 1.7% - 4.4% for coal. This limit the conversion of CO to CO_{2} in the water gas shift, and the production rate for H_{2} will decrease accordingly. However, the thermal efficiency of the pre-combustion capture using biomass resembles that of coal which is around 62% - 100%. Some research found that using a dry system instead of a biomass/water slurry fuel feed was more thermally efficient and practical for biomass.

=== Post-combustion ===
In addition to pre-combustion and oxy-fuel combustion technologies, post-combustion is a promising technology which can be used to extract CO_{2} emission from biomass fuel resources. During the process, CO_{2} is separated from the other gases in the flue gas stream after the biomass fuel is burnt and undergo separation process. Because it has the ability to be retrofitted to some existing power plants such as steam boilers or other newly built power stations, post-combustion technology is considered as a better option than pre-combustion technology. According to the fact sheets U.S. CONSUMPTION OF BIO-ENERGY WITH CARBON CAPTURE AND STORAGE released in March 2018, the efficiency of post-combustion technology is expected to be 95% while pre-combustion and oxy-combustion capture CO_{2} at an efficient rate of 85% and 87.5% respectively.

Development for current post-combustion technologies has not been entirely done due to several problems. One of the major concerns using this technology to capture carbon dioxide is the parasitic energy consumption. If the capacity of the unit is designed to be small, the heat loss to the surrounding is great enough to cause too many negative consequences. Another challenge of post-combustion carbon capture is how to deal with the mixture's components in the flue gases from initial biomass materials after combustion. The mixture consists of a high amount of alkali metals, halogens, acidic elements, and transition metals which might have negative impacts on the efficiency of the process. Thus, the choice of specific solvents and how to manage the solvent process should be carefully designed and operated.

== Biomass feedstocks ==
Biomass sources used in BECCS include agricultural residues & waste, forestry residue & waste, industrial & municipal wastes, and energy crops specifically grown for use as fuel.

A variety of challenges must be faced to ensure that biomass-based carbon capture is feasible and carbon neutral. Biomass stocks require availability of water and fertilizer inputs, which themselves exist at a nexus of environmental challenges in terms of resource disruption, conflict, and fertilizer runoff. A second major challenge is logistical: bulky biomass products require transportation to geographical features that enable sequestration.

== Projects and commercial plants ==
As of 2024, there are 3 large-scale BECCS projects operating in the world. All of these are ethanol plants. Between 1972 and 2017, plans were announced to sequester a total of 2.2 million tonnes of CO_{2} per year using CCS in biomass and waste power plants. None of these plans had come to fruition by 2022.

=== At ethanol plants ===
The Illinois Industrial Carbon Capture and Storage (IL-CCS) project, initiated in the early 21st century, is the first industrial-scale Bioenergy with Carbon Capture and Storage (BECCS) project. Located in Decatur, Illinois, USA, IL-CCS captures carbon dioxide (CO_{2}) from the Archer Daniels Midland (ADM) ethanol plant and injects it into the Mount Simon Sandstone, a deep saline formation. The IL-CCS project is divided into two phases. The pilot phase, running from November 2011 to November 2014, had a capital cost of approximately $84 million. During this period, the project successfully captured and sequestered 1 million tonnes of CO_{2} without any detected leakage from the injection zone. Monitoring continues for future reference. Phase 2 began in November 2017, utilizing the same injection zone with a capital cost of about $208 million, including $141 million in funding from the Department of Energy. This phase has a capture capacity three times larger than the pilot project, allowing IL-CCS to capture over 1 million tonnes of CO_{2} annually. As of 2019, IL-CCS was the largest BECCS project in the world.

In addition to IL-CCS, several other projects capture CO_{2} from ethanol plants on a smaller scale. Examples include:

- Arkalon in Kansas, USA: 0.18-0.29 MtCO2/year
- OCAP in the Netherlands: 0.1-0.3 MtCO2/year
- Husky Energy in Canada: 0.09-0.1 MtCO2/year

== Challenges ==
=== Environmental considerations ===
Some of the environmental considerations and other concerns about the widespread implementation of BECCS are similar to those of CCS. However, much of the critique towards CCS is that it may strengthen the dependency on depletable fossil fuels and environmentally invasive coal mining. This is not the case with BECCS, as it relies on renewable biomass. There are however other considerations which involve BECCS and these concerns are related to the possible increased use of biofuels. Biomass production is subject to a range of sustainability constraints, with widespread adoption of BECCS risking transgression of planetary boundaries, such as scarcity of arable land and fresh water, loss of biodiversity, competition with food production and deforestation. It is important to make sure that biomass is used in a way that maximizes both energy and climate benefits. There has been criticism to some suggested BECCS deployment scenarios, where there would be a very heavy reliance on increased biomass input.

Large areas of land would be required to operate BECCS on an industrial scale. To remove 10 billion tonnes of CO_{2}, upwards of 300 million hectares of land area (larger than India) would be required. As a result, BECCS risks using land that could be better suited to agriculture and food production, especially in developing countries.

These systems may have other negative side effects. There is however presently no need to expand the use of biofuels in energy or industry applications to allow for BECCS deployment. There is already today considerable emissions from point sources of biomass derived CO_{2}, which could be utilized for BECCS. Though, in possible future bioenergy system upscaling scenarios, this may be an important consideration.

The IPCC Sixth Assessment Report says: "Extensive deployment of bioenergy with carbon capture and storage (BECCS) and afforestation would require larger amounts of freshwater resources than used by the previous vegetation, altering the water cycle at regional scales (high confidence) with potential consequences for downstream uses, biodiversity, and regional climate, depending on prior land cover, background climate conditions, and scale of deployment (high confidence)."

=== Technical challenges ===
A challenge for applying BECCS technology, as with other carbon capture and storage technologies, is to find suitable geographic locations to build combustion plant and to sequester captured CO_{2}. If biomass sources are not close by the combustion unit, transporting biomass emits CO_{2} offsetting the amount of CO_{2} captured by BECCS. BECCS also face technical concerns about efficiency of burning biomass. While each type of biomass has a different heating value, biomass in general is a low-quality fuel. Thermal conversion of biomass typically has an efficiency of 20-27%. For comparison, coal-fired plants have an efficiency of about 37%.

BECCS also faces a question whether the process is actually energy positive. Low energy conversion efficiency, energy-intensive biomass supply, combined with the energy required to power the CO_{2} capture and storage unit impose energy penalty on the system. This might lead to a low power generation efficiency.

== Alternative biomass sources ==
Source	CO_{2} Source	Sector
Ethanol production	Fermentation of biomass such as sugarcane, wheat or corn releases CO_{2} as a by-product.	Industry
Pulp and paper mills Cement production	CO_{2} produced in recovery boilers.; CO_{2} produced in lime kilns, such as when making cement.; For gasification technologies, CO_{2} is produced during the gasification of black liquor and biomass such as the tree bark and wood.; Huge amounts of CO_{2} are also released by the combustion of syngas, a product of gasification, in the combined cycle process.	Industry
Biogas production	In the biogas upgrading process, CO_{2} is separated from the methane to produce a higher quality gas.	Industry
Electrical power plants	Combustion of biomass or biofuel in steam or gas powered generators releases CO_{2} as a by-product.	Energy
Heat power plants	Combustion of biofuel for heat generation releases CO_{2} as a by-product. Usually used for district heating.	Energy

=== Agricultural and forestry residues ===
Globally, 14 Gt of forestry residue and 4.4 Gt residues from crop production (mainly barley, wheat, corn, sugarcane and rice) are generated every year. This is a significant amount of biomass which can be combusted to generate 26 EJ/year and achieve a 2.8 Gt of negative CO_{2} emission through BECCS. Utilizing residues for carbon capture will provide social and economic benefits to rural communities. Using waste from crops and forestry is a way to avoid the ecological and social challenges of BECCS.

Among the forest bioenergy strategies being promoted, forest residue gasification for electricity production has gained policy traction in many developing countries because of the abundance of forest biomass, and their affordability, given that they are a by-products of conventional forestry functioning. Additionally, unlike the sporadic nature of wind and solar, forest residue gasification for electricity can be uninterrupted, and modified to meet switch in energy demand. Forest industries are well positioned to play a prominent role in facilitating the adoption and upscale of forest bioenergy strategies in response to energy security and climate change challenges. However, the economic costs of forest residue utilization for bioelectricity production and its potential financial impact on conventional forestry operations are poorly represented in forest bioenergy studies. Exploring these opportunities, particularly in developing country contexts can be buttressed by investigations that assess the financial feasibility of joint production for timber and bioelectricity.

Despite the growing policy directives and mandates to produce electricity from woody biomass, the uncertainty around the financial feasibility and risks to investors continue to impede the transition to this renewable energy pathway, particularly in developing countries where the demand are the highest. This is because investments in forest bioenergy projects are exposed to high levels of financial risks. The high capital costs, operation costs, and maintenance costs of harvest residue-based gasification plant and their associated risks can keep the potential investor from investing in a forest-based bioelectricity project.

=== Municipal solid waste ===
Since municipal solid waste contains some biogenic substances like food, wood and paper, waste incineration can to a degree considered a source of bioenergy. Around 44% of waste globally is estimated to consist of food and green waste; a further 17% is paper and cardboard. It has been estimated that carbon capture would reduce the carbon emissions associated with waste incinerators by 700 kg CO_{2} per kg of waste, assuming an 85% capture rate. The specific waste composition does not greatly affect this.

=== Co-firing coal with biomass ===
As of 2017 there were roughly 250 cofiring plants in the world, including 40 in the US. Biomass cofiring with coal has efficiency near those of coal combustion. Instead of co-firing, full conversion from coal to biomass of one or more generating units in a plant may be preferred.

== Policy ==
Based on the Kyoto Protocol agreement, carbon capture and storage projects were not applicable as an emission reduction tool to be used for the Clean Development Mechanism (CDM) or for Joint Implementation (JI) projects. As of 2006, there had been growing support to have fossil CCS and BECCS included in the protocol and the Paris Agreement. Accounting studies on how this could be implemented, including BECCS, have also been done.

=== European Union ===
There were policies to incentivice to use bioenergy such as Renewable Energy Directive (RED) and Fuel Quality Directive (FQD), which require 20% of total energy consumption to be based on biomass, bioliquids and biogas by 2020.

Sweden

The Swedish Energy Agency was commissioned by the Swedish government to design a Swedish support system for BECCS to be implemented by 2022.

=== United Kingdom ===
In 2018 the Committee on Climate Change recommended that aviation biofuels should provide up to 10% of total aviation fuel demand by 2050, and that all aviation biofuels should be produced with CCS as soon as the technology is available.

=== United States ===
In 2018, the US congress increased and extended the section 45Q tax credit for sequestration of carbon oxides, a top priority of carbon capture and sequestration (CCS) supporters for several years. It increased $25.70 to $50 tax credit per tonnes of CO_{2} for secure geological storage and $15.30 to $35 tax credit per tonne of CO_{2} used in enhanced oil recovery.

== Public perception ==
Limited studies have investigated public perceptions of BECCS. Of those studies, most originate from developed countries in the northern hemisphere and therefore may not represent a worldwide view.

In a 2018 study involving online panel respondents from the United Kingdom, United States, Australia, and New Zealand, respondents showed little prior awareness of BECCS technologies. Measures of respondents perceptions suggest that the public associate BECCS with a balance of both positive and negative attributes. Across the four countries, 45% of the respondents indicated they would support small scale trials of BECCS, whereas only 21% were opposed. BECCS was moderately preferred among other methods of carbon dioxide removal like direct air capture or enhanced weathering, and greatly preferred over methods of solar radiation management.

A 2019 study in Oxfordshire, UK found that public perception of BECCS was significantly influenced by the policies used to support the practice. Participants generally approved of taxes and standards, but they had mixed feelings about the government providing funding support.

== See also ==
- Biosequestration
- Carbon dioxide removal
- Carbon negative
- Climate change mitigation scenarios
- Climate engineering
- List of emerging technologies
- Low-carbon economy
- United Nations Environment Programme
- Virgin Earth Challenge
