= Carbon dioxide scrubber =

Device which absorbs carbon dioxide from circulated gas

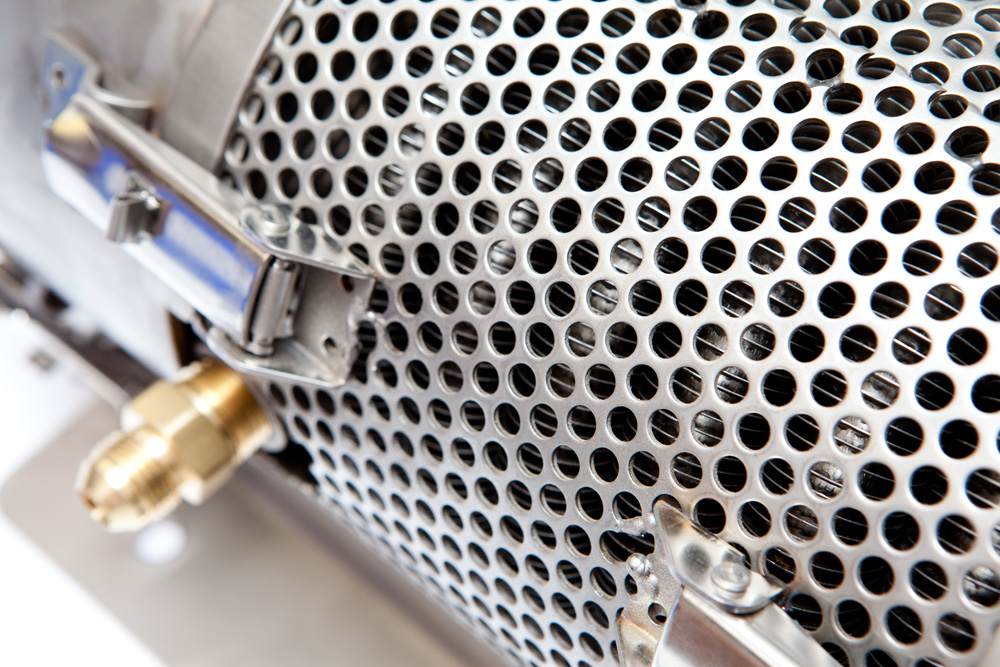
A carbon dioxide scrubber

A carbon dioxide scrubber is a piece of equipment that absorbs carbon dioxide (CO_{2}). It is used to treat exhaust gases from industrial plants or from exhaled air in life support systems such as rebreathers or in spacecraft, submersible craft or airtight chambers. Carbon dioxide scrubbers are also used in controlled atmosphere (CA) storage and carbon capture and storage processes. Some of them include an absorbent canister.

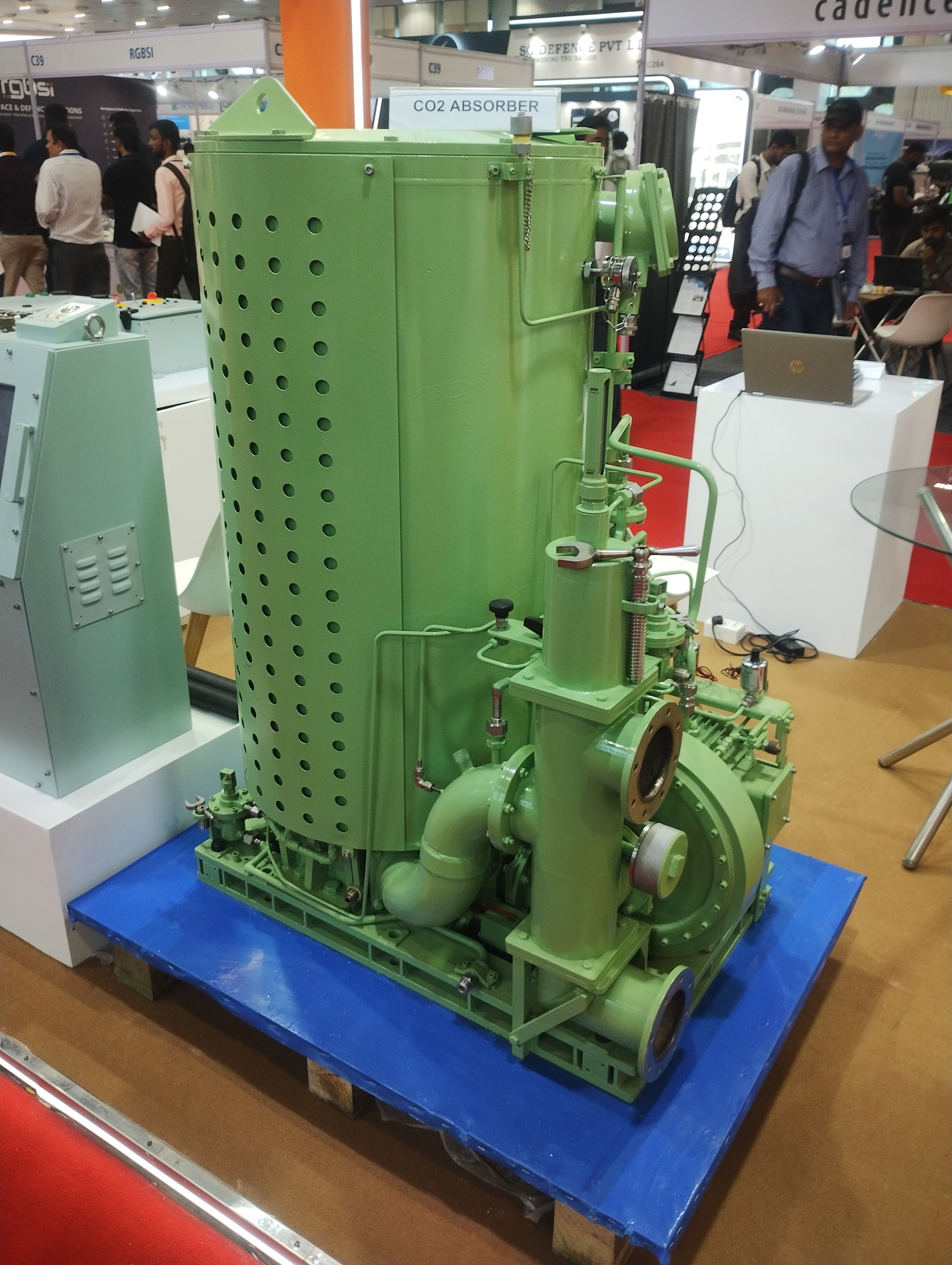
A CO2 absorber machine at DEF-TECH Bharat 2026 exhibition, KTPO, Bengaluru

== Amine scrubbing ==
The amine scrubbers use various organic amines, e.g. monoethanolamine. Cold solutions of these organic compounds bind CO_{2}, but the binding is reversed at higher temperatures:

CO_{2} + 2 HOCH_{2}CH_{2}NH_{2} ↔ HOCH_{2}CH_{2}NH^{+}_{3} + HOCH_{2}CH_{2}NHCO^{−}_{2}

As of 2009, this technology has only been lightly implemented in coal-fired power plants because of capital costs of installing the facility and the operating costs of utilizing it. However, the technology has been utilized as a primary part of atmosphere control in nuclear submarines since the late 1950s.

== Minerals and zeolites ==
Several minerals and mineral-like materials reversibly bind CO_{2}. Most often, these minerals are oxides or hydroxides, and often the CO_{2} is bound as carbonate. Carbon dioxide reacts with quicklime (calcium oxide) to form limestone (calcium carbonate), in a process called carbonate looping. Other minerals include serpentinite, a magnesium silicate hydroxide, and olivine. Molecular sieves also function in this capacity.

Various (cyclical) scrubbing processes have been proposed to remove CO_{2} from the air or from flue gases and release them in a controlled environment, reverting the scrubbing agent. These usually involve using a variant of the Kraft process which may be based on sodium hydroxide. The CO_{2} is absorbed into such a solution, transfers to lime (via a process called causticization) and is released again through the use of a kiln. With some modifications to the existing processes (mainly changing to an oxygen-fired kiln) the resulting exhaust becomes a concentrated stream of CO_{2}, ready for storage or use in fuels. An alternative to this thermo-chemical process is an electrical one which releases the CO_{2} through electrolyzing of the carbonate solution. While simpler, this electrical process consumes more energy as electrolysis also splits water. Early incarnations of environmentally motivated CO_{2} capture used electricity as the energy source and were therefore dependent on green energy. Some thermal CO_{2} capture systems use heat generated on-site, which reduces the inefficiencies resulting from off-site electricity production, but it still needs a source of (green) heat, which nuclear power or concentrated solar power could provide.

=== Sodium hydroxide ===
Zeman and Lackner outlined a specific method of air capture.

First, CO_{2} is absorbed by an alkaline NaOH solution to produce dissolved sodium carbonate. The absorption reaction is a gas liquid reaction, strongly exothermic, here:

2NaOH(aq) + CO_{2}(g) → Na_{2}CO_{3}(aq) + H_{2}O(l)

Na_{2}CO_{3}(aq) + Ca(OH)_{2}(s) → 2NaOH(aq) + CaCO_{3}(s)

ΔH° = −114.7 kJ/mol

Causticization is performed ubiquitously in the pulp and paper industry and readily transfers 94% of the carbonate ions from the sodium to the calcium cation. Subsequently, the calcium carbonate precipitate is filtered from solution and thermally decomposed to produce gaseous CO_{2}. The calcination reaction is the only endothermic reaction in the process and is shown here:

CaCO_{3}(s) → CaO(s) + CO_{2}(g)

ΔH° = +179.2 kJ/mol

The thermal decomposition of calcite is performed in a lime kiln fired with oxygen in order to avoid an additional gas separation step. Hydration of the lime (CaO) completes the cycle. Lime hydration is an exothermic reaction that can be performed with water or steam. Using water, it is a liquid/solid reaction as shown here:

CaO(s) + H_{2}O(l) → Ca(OH)_{2}(s)

ΔH° = −64.5 kJ/mol

=== Lithium hydroxide ===
Other strong bases such as soda lime, sodium hydroxide, potassium hydroxide, and lithium hydroxide are able to remove carbon dioxide by chemically reacting with it. In particular, lithium hydroxide was used aboard spacecraft, such as in the Apollo program, to remove carbon dioxide from the atmosphere. It reacts with carbon dioxide to form lithium carbonate. Recently lithium hydroxide absorbent technology has been adapted for use in anesthesia machines. Anesthesia machines which provide life support and inhaled agents during surgery typically employ a closed circuit necessitating the removal of carbon dioxide exhaled by the patient. Lithium hydroxide may offer some safety and convenience benefits over the older calcium based products.

2 LiOH(s) + 2 H_{2}O(g) → 2 LiOH·H_{2}O(s)
2 LiOH·H_{2}O(s) + CO_{2}(g) → Li_{2}CO_{3}(s) + 3 H_{2}O(g)

The net reaction being:

2LiOH(s) + CO_{2}(g) → Li_{2}CO_{3}(s) + H_{2}O(g)

Lithium peroxide can also be used as it absorbs more CO_{2} per unit weight with the added advantage of releasing oxygen.

In recent years lithium orthosilicate has attracted much attention towards CO_{2} capture, as well as energy storage. This material offers considerable performance advantages although it requires high temperatures for the formation of carbonate to take place.

== Regenerative carbon dioxide removal system ==
The regenerative carbon dioxide removal system (RCRS) on the Space Shuttle orbiter used a two-bed system that provided continuous removal of carbon dioxide without expendable products. Regenerable systems allowed a shuttle mission a longer stay in space without having to replenish its sorbent canisters. Older lithium hydroxide (LiOH)-based systems, which are non-regenerable, were replaced by regenerable metal-oxide-based systems. A system based on metal oxide primarily consisted of a metal oxide sorbent canister and a regenerator assembly. It worked by removing carbon dioxide using a sorbent material and then regenerating the sorbent material. The metal-oxide sorbent canister was regenerated by pumping air at approximately 200 °C (392 °F) through it at a standard flow rate of 3.5 L/s (7.4 cu ft/min) for 10 hours.

== Activated carbon ==
Activated carbon can be used as a carbon dioxide scrubber. Air with high carbon dioxide content, such as air from fruit storage locations, can be blown through beds of activated carbon and the carbon dioxide will adhere to the activated carbon [adsorption]. Once the bed is saturated it must then be "regenerated" by blowing low carbon dioxide air, such as ambient air, through the bed. This will release the carbon dioxide from the bed, and it can then be used to scrub again, leaving the net amount of carbon dioxide in the air the same as when the process was started.

== Metal-organic frameworks (MOFs) ==
Metal-organic frameworks are well-studied for carbon dioxide capture and sequestration via adsorption. No large-scale commercial technology exists. In one set of tests MOFs were able to separate 90% of the CO_{2} from the flue gas stream using a vacuum pressure swing process. The cost of energy is estimated to increase by 65% if MOFs were used vs an increase of 81% for amines as the capturing agent.

== Extend air cartridge ==
An extend air cartridge (EAC) is a make or type of pre-loaded one-use absorbent canister that can be fitted into a recipient cavity in a suitably-designed rebreather.

== Other methods ==
Many other methods and materials have been discussed for scrubbing carbon dioxide.

- Adsorption
- Regenerative carbon dioxide removal system (RCRS)
- Algae filled bioreactors
- Membrane gas separations
- Reversing heat exchangers

== See also ==
- Carbon capture and storage – Process of capturing and storing carbon dioxide from industrial flue gas
- Carbon dioxide removal – Removal of atmospheric carbon dioxide through human activity
- Greenhouse gas – Heat-trapping gas in an atmosphere
- Rebreather – Portable apparatus to recycle breathing gas
- Sabatier reaction – Methanation process of carbon dioxide with hydrogen
