= Bioenergy =

Renewable energy made from biomass

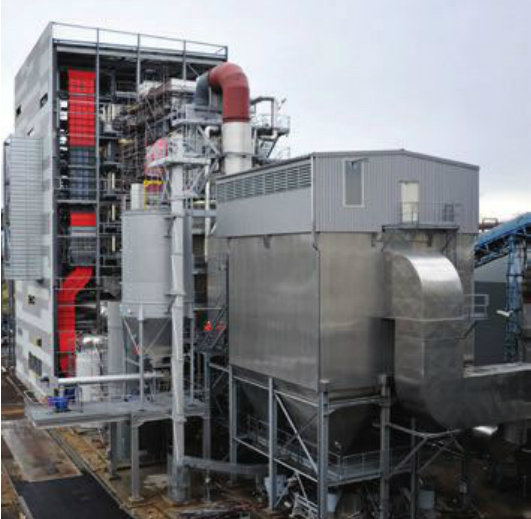
A CHP power station using wood to supply 30,000 households in France with bioenergy as a renewable energy source

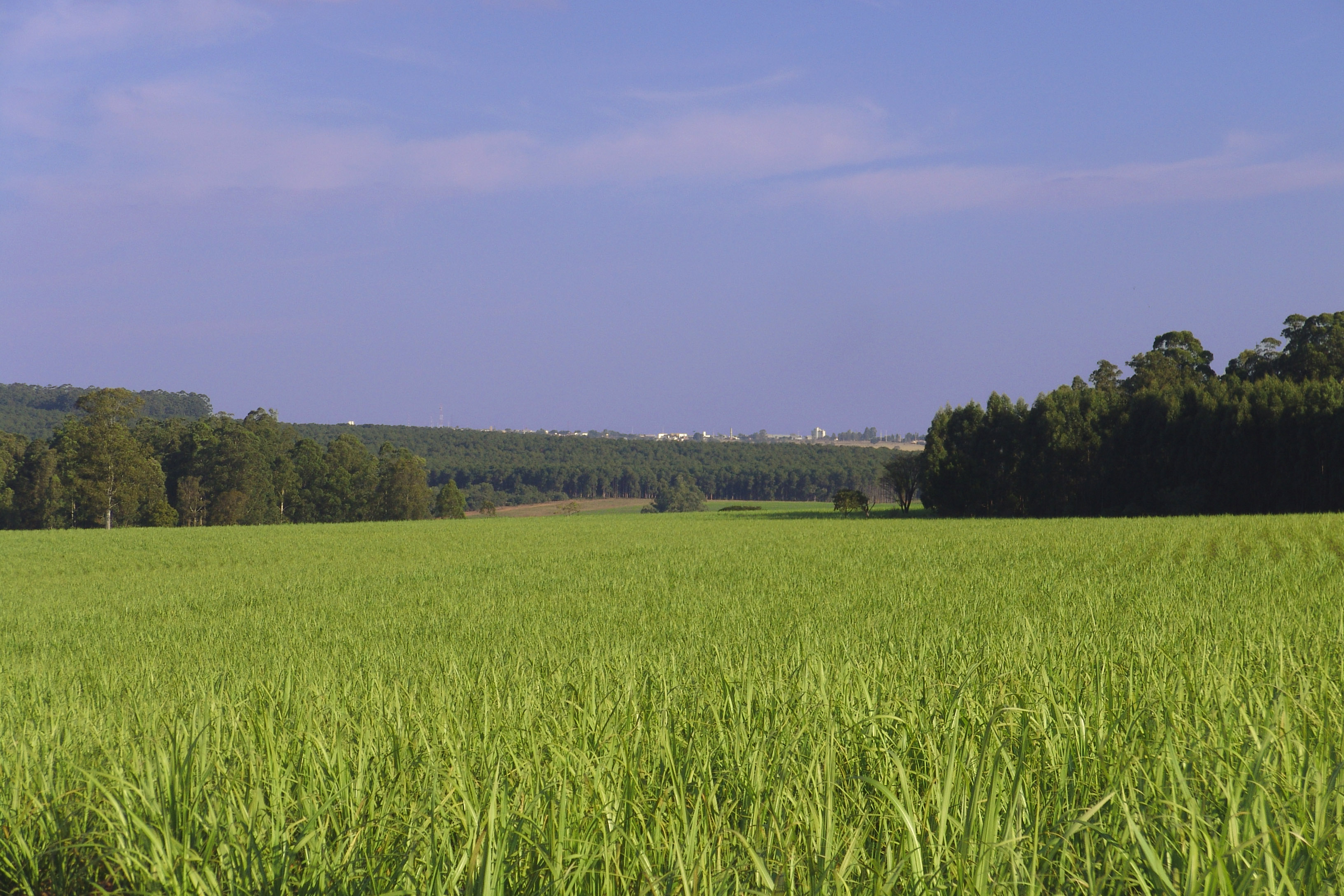
Sugarcane plantation to produce ethanol for bioenergy production in Brazil

Bioenergy is the renewable energy obtained by using biomass as fuel. The fuel may be wood or crops grown for energy, or it may come from harvest residues and other organic waste. Some households still cook and heat their homes by burning wood or other biomass in simple stoves or over open fires. Modern biomass systems range from boilers that heat buildings or supply process heat to factories to power plants that generate electricity. It can also be converted into biogas or liquid biofuels.

Burning biomass releases carbon dioxide. Over its life cycle, bioenergy can result in lower or higher greenhouse gas emissions than the energy source it replaces. Using wood for energy releases carbon dioxide when the wood is burned. Harvesting and transport can add to those emissions. For wood harvested as fuel, one factor is how much carbon the forest would have stored if the trees had stayed in the ground.

== Definition and terminology ==
The IPCC Sixth Assessment Report defines bioenergy as "energy derived from any form of biomass or its metabolic by-products". It goes on to define biomass in this context as "organic material excluding the material that is fossilised or embedded in geological formations". This means that coal or other fossil fuels is not a form of biomass in this context.

The term traditional biomass for bioenergy means "the combustion of wood, charcoal, agricultural residues and/or animal dung for cooking or heating in open fires or in inefficient stoves as is common in low-income countries".

Since biomass can also be used as a fuel directly (e.g. wood logs), the terms biomass and biofuel have sometimes been used interchangeably. However, the term biomass usually denotes the biological raw material the fuel is made of. The terms biofuel or biogas are generally reserved for liquid or gaseous fuels respectively.

== Input materials ==
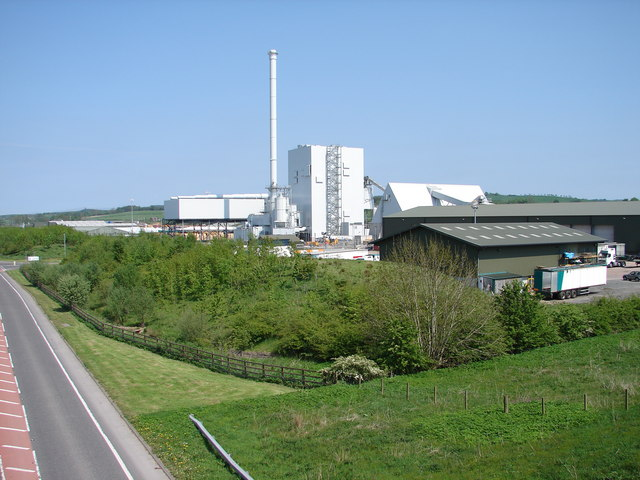
Biomass plant in Scotland.

Changes in consumption of bioenergy by type, 2010–2023.

Wood and wood residues is the largest biomass energy source today. Wood can be used as a fuel directly or processed into pellet fuel or other forms of fuels. Other plants can also be used as fuel, for instance maize, switchgrass, miscanthus and bamboo. The main waste feedstocks are wood waste, agricultural waste, municipal solid waste, and manufacturing waste. Upgrading raw biomass to higher grade fuels can be achieved by different methods, broadly classified as thermal, chemical, or biochemical:

Thermal conversion processes use heat as the dominant mechanism to upgrade biomass into a better and more practical fuel. The basic alternatives are torrefaction, pyrolysis, and gasification, these are separated mainly by the extent to which the chemical reactions involved are allowed to proceed (mainly controlled by the availability of oxygen and conversion temperature).

Many chemical conversions are based on established coal-based processes, such as the Fischer-Tropsch synthesis. Like coal, biomass can be converted into multiple commodity chemicals.

Biochemical processes have developed in nature to break down the molecules of which biomass is composed, and many of these can be harnessed. In most cases, microorganisms are used to perform the conversion. The processes are called anaerobic digestion, fermentation, and composting.

== Applications ==
=== Biomass for heating ===
Wood, charcoal, crop residues and animal dung are used for cooking and heating in open fires and simple stoves. Open fires and simple stoves burning wood, charcoal, crop residues or dung are still used for cooking and heating.

Modern biomass heating includes boilers that burn wood pellets or chips to heat buildings, and industrial systems that use biomass to provide process heat. Industries can also burn residues from their own operations. Crushing sugarcane leaves a fibrous residue called bagasse. Sugar mills can burn it to heat the juice during processing.

District heating networks can distribute heat from biomass boilers and combined heat and power plants. In the European Union, bioenergy accounted for about three-quarters of renewable heating and cooling and nearly one-fifth of total heating and cooling consumption in 2023.

=== Electricity and combined heat and power ===
Solid biomass, such as wood chips, can be burned in a boiler to produce steam that drives a turbine. Biogas can be burned in an engine connected to a generator. In combined heat and power (CHP) plants, heat from electricity generation is recovered for uses such as industrial processes or district heating.

In Jühnde, Germany, a biogas CHP plant was built to feed electricity into the public grid and supply heat to connected homes through a hot-water network. A separate wood-chip boiler covers additional heat demand in winter.

=== Biofuel for transportation ===
Based on the source of biomass, biofuels are classified broadly into two major categories, depending if food crops are used or not:

First-generation (or "conventional") biofuels are made from food sources grown on arable lands, such as sugarcane and maize. Sugars present in this biomass are fermented to produce bioethanol, an alcohol fuel which serves as an additive to gasoline, or in a fuel cell to produce electricity. Bioethanol is made by fermentation, mostly from carbohydrates produced in sugar or starch crops such as corn, sugarcane, or sweet sorghum. Bioethanol is widely used in the United States and in Brazil. Biodiesel is produced from the oils in for instance rapeseed or sugar beets and is the most common biofuel in Europe.

Second-generation biofuels (also called "advanced biofuels") utilize non-food-based biomass sources such as perennial energy crops and agricultural residues/waste. The feedstock used to make the fuels either grow on arable land but are byproducts of the main crop, or they are grown on marginal land. Waste from industry, agriculture, forestry and households can also be used for second-generation biofuels, using e.g. anaerobic digestion to produce biogas, gasification to produce syngas or by direct combustion. Cellulosic biomass, derived from non-food sources, such as trees and grasses, is being developed as a feedstock for ethanol production, and biodiesel can be produced from left-over food products like vegetable oils and animal fats.

=== Production of liquid fuels ===
- Biomass to liquid
- Bioconversion of biomass to mixed alcohol fuels

== Comparison with other renewable energy types ==
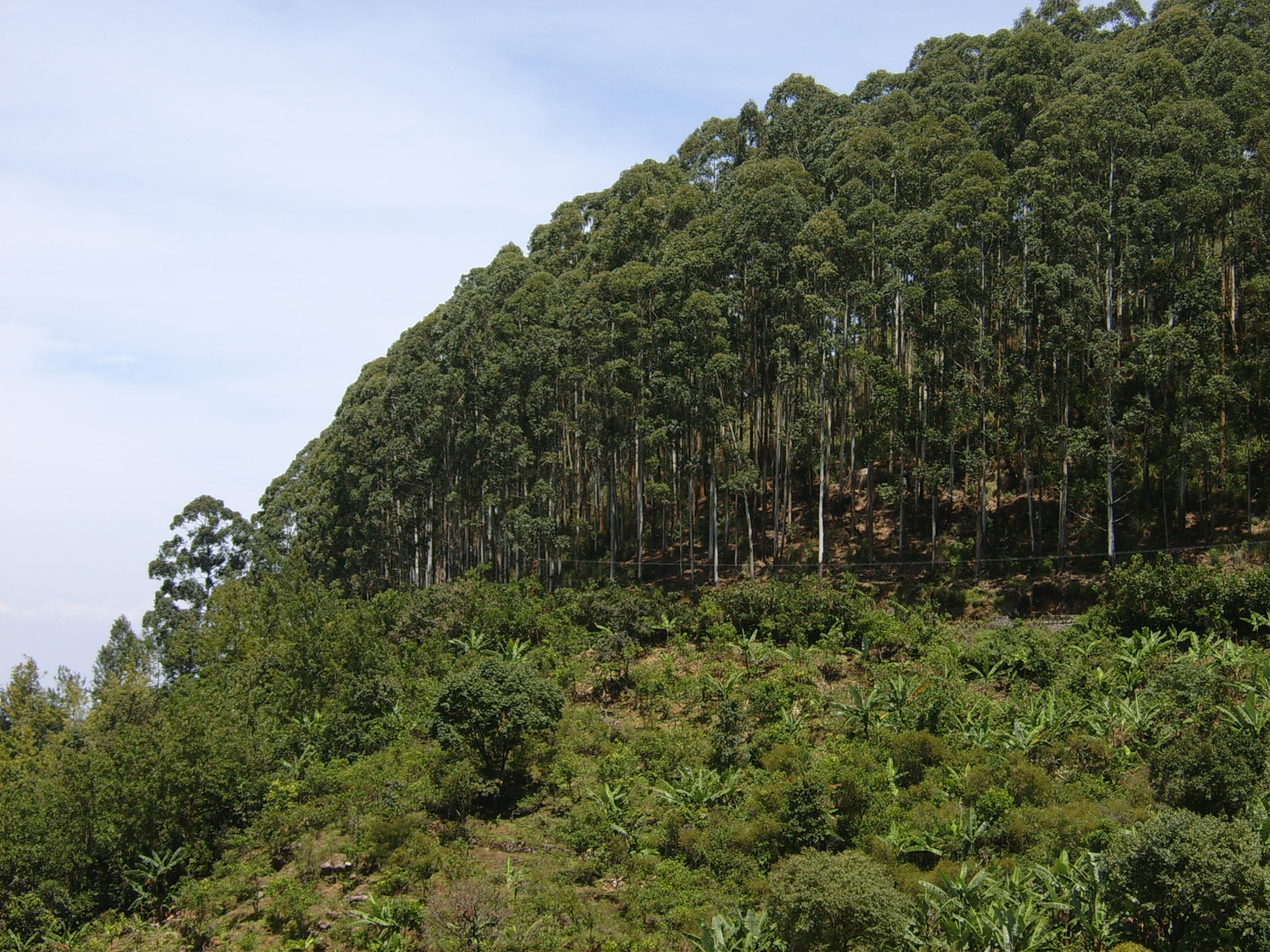
Eucalyptus plantation in India.

=== Land requirement ===
The surface power production densities of a crop will determine how much land is required for production. The average lifecycle surface power densities for biomass, wind, hydro and solar power production are 0.30 W/m^{2}, 1 W/m^{2}, 3 W/m^{2} and 5 W/m^{2}, respectively (power in the form of heat for biomass, and electricity for wind, hydro and solar). Lifecycle surface power density includes land used by all supporting infrastructure, manufacturing, mining/harvesting and decommissioning.

Another estimate puts the values at 0.08 W/m^{2} for biomass, 0.14 W/m^{2} for hydro, 1.84 W/m^{2} for wind, and 6.63 W/m^{2} for solar (median values, with none of the renewable sources exceeding 10 W/m^{2}).

== Related technologies ==
=== Bioenergy with carbon capture and storage (BECCS) ===
Carbon capture and storage technology can be used to capture emissions from bioenergy power plants. This process is known as bioenergy with carbon capture and storage (BECCS) and can result in net carbon dioxide removal from the atmosphere. However, BECCS can also result in net positive emissions depending on how the biomass material is grown, harvested, and transported. Deployment of BECCS at scales described in some climate change mitigation pathways would require converting large amounts of cropland.

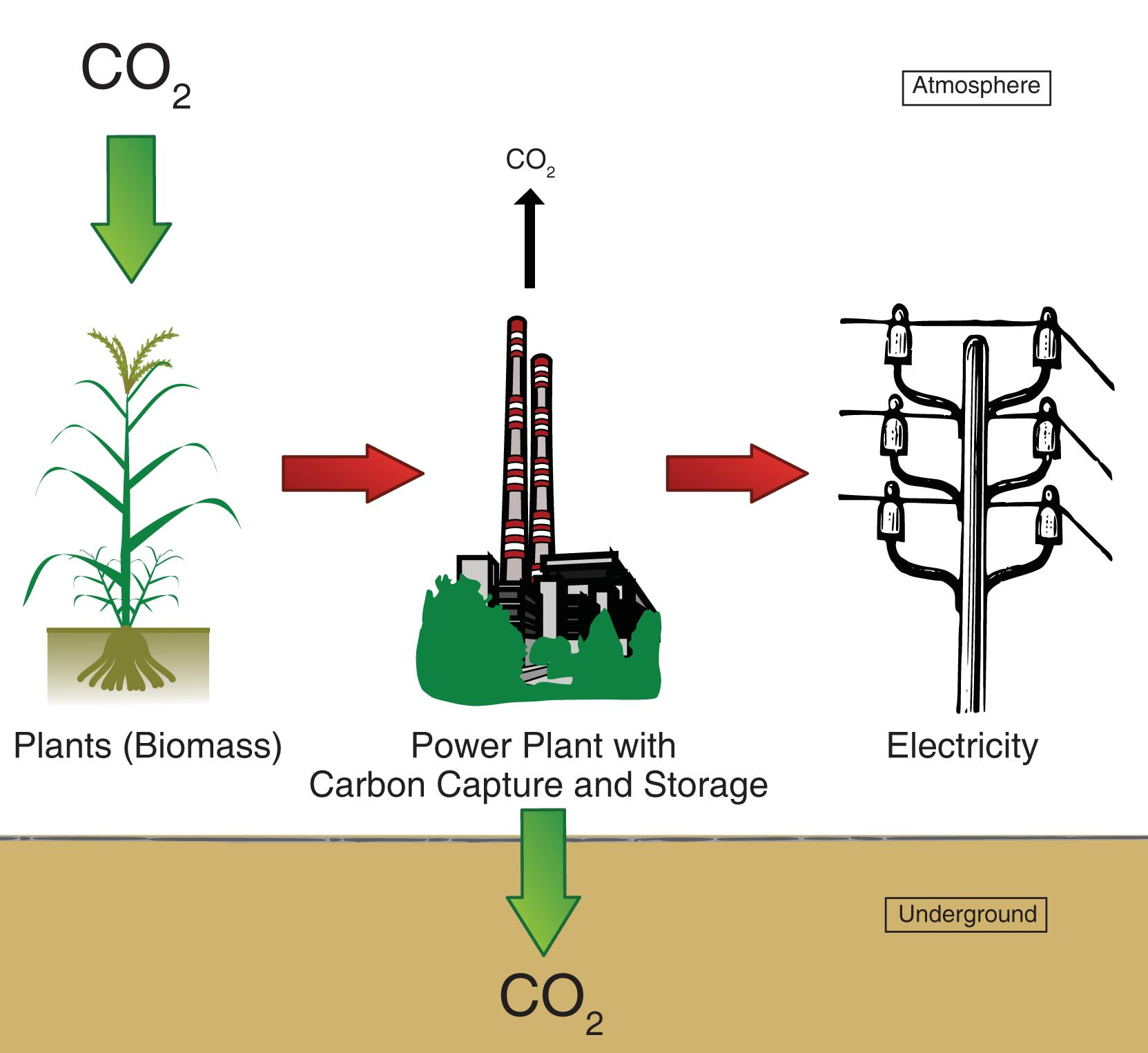
Example of BECCS: Diagram of bioenergy power plant with carbon capture and storage.

Bioenergy with carbon capture and storage (BECCS) is the process of extracting bioenergy from biomass and capturing and storing the carbon dioxide (CO_{2}) that is produced.

Greenhouse gas emissions from bioenergy can be low because when vegetation is harvested for bioenergy, new vegetation can grow that will absorb CO_{2} from the air through photosynthesis. After the biomass is harvested, energy ("bioenergy") is extracted in useful forms (electricity, heat, biofuels, etc.) as the biomass is utilized through combustion, fermentation, pyrolysis or other conversion methods. Using bioenergy releases CO_{2}. In BECCS, some of the CO_{2} is captured before it enters the atmosphere and stored underground using carbon capture and storage technology. Under some conditions, BECCS can remove carbon dioxide from the atmosphere.

The potential range of negative emissions from BECCS was estimated to be zero to 22 giga tonnes per year. As of 2024, there are large-scale 3 BECCS projects operating in the world. Wide deployment of BECCS is constrained by cost and availability of biomass. Since biomass production is land-intensive, deployment of BECCS can pose major risks to food production, human rights, and biodiversity.

== Climate and sustainability aspects ==
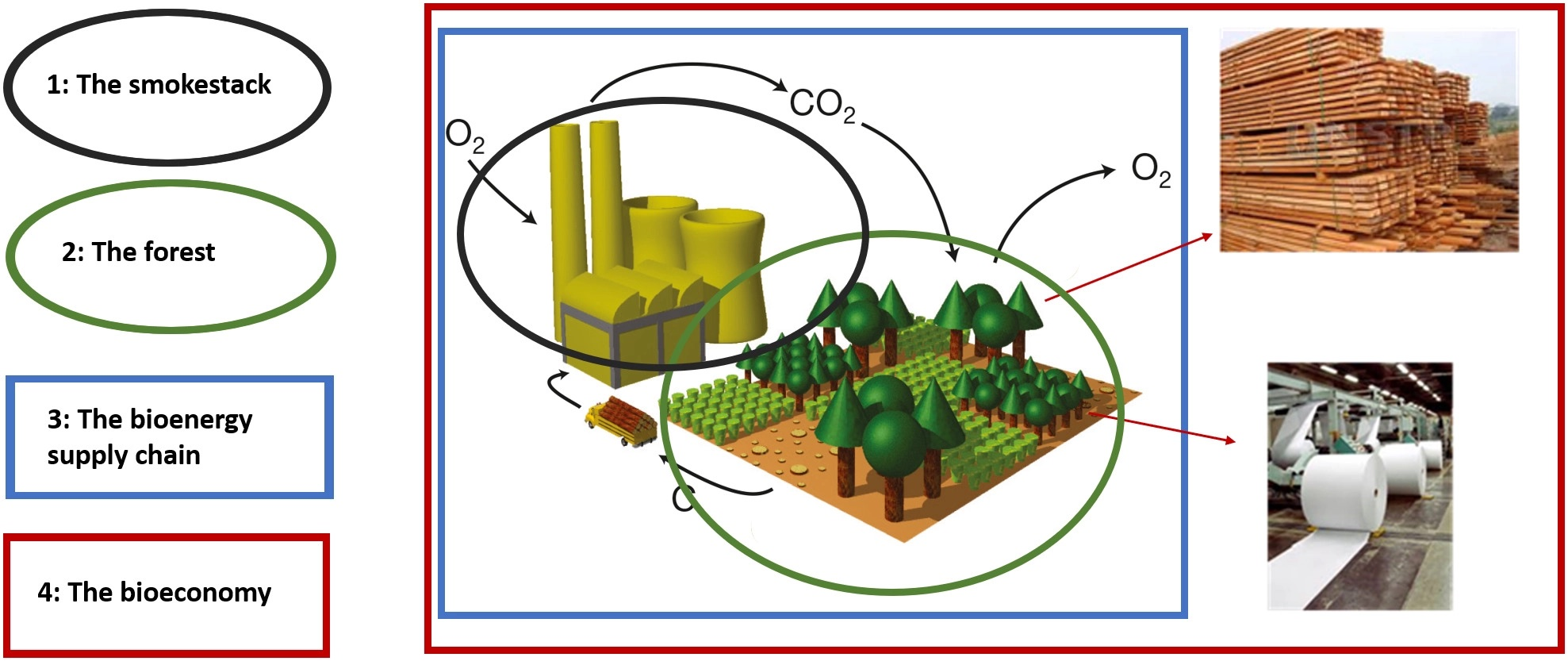
Alternative system boundaries for assessing climate effects of forest-based bioenergy. Option 1 (black) considers only the stack emissions; Option 2 (green) considers only the forest carbon stock; Option 3 (blue) considers the bioenergy supply chain; Option 4 (red) covers the whole bioeconomy, including wood products in addition to biomass.

The climate impact of bioenergy varies considerably depending on where biomass feedstocks come from and how they are grown. For example, burning wood for energy releases carbon dioxide; those emissions can be significantly offset if the trees that were harvested are replaced by new trees in a well-managed forest, as the new trees will absorb carbon dioxide from the air as they grow. However, the establishment and cultivation of bioenergy crops can displace natural ecosystems, degrade soils, and consume water resources and synthetic fertilisers.

Approximately one-third of all wood used for traditional heating and cooking in tropical areas is harvested unsustainably. Bioenergy feedstocks typically require significant amounts of energy to harvest, dry, and transport; the energy usage for these processes may emit greenhouse gases. In some cases, the impacts of land-use change, cultivation, and processing can result in higher overall carbon emissions for bioenergy compared to using fossil fuels.

Use of farmland for growing biomass can result in less land being available for growing food. In the United States, around 10% of motor gasoline has been replaced by corn-based ethanol, which requires a significant proportion of the harvest. In Malaysia and Indonesia, clearing forests to produce palm oil for biodiesel has led to serious social and environmental effects, as these forests are critical carbon sinks and habitats for diverse species. Since photosynthesis captures only a small fraction of the energy in sunlight, producing a given amount of bioenergy requires a large amount of land compared to other renewable energy sources.

== Environmental impacts ==
Bioenergy can either mitigate (i.e. reduce) or increase greenhouse gas emissions. Local environmental impacts can be problematic. For example, forests are sometimes cleared for the production of sugarcane-derived bioethanol, like in the case of a large-scale project in Indonesia in 2025.

Biomass production can create significant social and environmental pressure in the locations where the biomass is produced. The impact is primarily related to the low surface power density of biomass. The low surface power density has the effect that much larger land areas are needed in order to produce the same amount of energy, compared to for instance fossil fuels.

Long-distance transport of biomass have been criticised as wasteful and unsustainable, and there have been protests against forest biomass export in Sweden and Canada.

== Scale and future trends ==
In 2020 bioenergy produced 58 EJ (exajoules) of energy, compared to 172 EJ from crude oil, 157 EJ from coal, 138 EJ from natural gas, 29 EJ from nuclear, 16 EJ from hydro and 15 EJ from wind, solar and geothermal combined. Most of the global bioenergy is produced from forest resources.

Generally, bioenergy expansion fell by 50% in 2020. China and Europe are the only two regions that reported significant expansion in 2020, adding 2 GW and 1.2 GW of bioenergy capacity, respectively.

Almost all available sawmill residue is already being utilized for pellet production, so there is no room for expansion. For the bioenergy sector to significantly expand in the future, more of the harvested pulpwood must go to pellet mills. However, the harvest of pulpwood (tree thinnings) removes the possibility for these trees to grow old and therefore maximize their carbon holding capacity. Compared to pulpwood, sawmill residues have lower net emissions: "Some types of biomass feedstock can be carbon-neutral, at least over a period of a few years, including in particular sawmill residues. These are wastes from other forest operations that imply no additional harvesting, and if otherwise burnt as waste or left to rot would release carbon to the atmosphere in any case."

== See also ==
- Biochar
- Biomass to liquid
- Biorefinery
- Bioenergy village
- European Biomass Association
- Indirect land use change impacts of biofuels
