= Virgin Earth Challenge =

Competition for permanent removal of greenhouse gases

- The Virgin Earth Challenge logo
- Description: Prize for commercially viable greenhouse gas removal
- Country: United Kingdom
- Presented by: Richard Branson / Virgin Group
- Reward: $25 million

The Virgin Earth Challenge was a competition offering a $25 million prize for whoever could demonstrate a commercially viable design which results in the permanent removal of greenhouse gases out of the Earth's atmosphere to contribute materially in global warming avoidance. The prize was conceived by Richard Branson, and was announced in London on 9 February 2007 by Branson and former US Vice President Al Gore.

Among more than 2600 applications, 11 finalists were announced on 2 November 2011. These were Biochar Solutions, from the US; Biorecro, Sweden; Black Carbon, Denmark; Carbon Engineering, Canada; Climeworks, Switzerland; COAWAY, US; Full Circle Biochar, US; Global Thermostat, US; Kilimanjaro Energy, US; Smartstones – Olivine Foundation, Netherlands, and The Savory Institute, US.

The prize was never awarded. In 2019, Virgin took the prize website offline after having kept the 11 finalists in suspension for eight years. Al Gore had withdrawn from the jury earlier and commented that he was not part of the decision to discontinue the contest.

== The challenge ==
The Prize was to be awarded to "a commercially viable design which, achieves or appears capable of achieving the net removal of significant volumes of anthropogenic, atmospheric GHGs each year for at least 10 years", with significant volumes specified as "should be scalable to a significant size in order to meet the informal removal target of 1 billion tonnes of carbon-equivalent per year". One tonne of carbon-equivalent (C) equals 3.67 tonnes of carbon dioxide (CO_{2}). (Because of the relationship between their atomic weights, more precisely 44/12.) At present, fossil fuel emissions are around 6.3 gigatons of carbon.

The prize would initially only be open for five years, with ideas assessed by a panel of judges including Richard Branson, Al Gore and Crispin Tickell (British diplomat), as well as scientists James E. Hansen, James Lovelock and Tim Flannery. The prize term was extended until 2019.

Around two hundred billion metric tons of carbon dioxide have accumulated in the atmosphere since the beginning of the Industrial Revolution, raising concentrations by more than 100 parts per million (ppm), from 280 to more than 380 ppm. The Virgin Earth Challenge was intended to inspire inventors to find ways of bringing that back down again to avoid the dangerous levels of global warming and sea level rise predicted by organisations such as the Intergovernmental Panel on Climate Change.

The Virgin Earth Challenge was similar in concept to other high technology competitions, such as the Orteig Prize for flying across the Atlantic, and the Ansari X Prize for spaceflight.

== Competing technologies ==
The eleven finalists represent five competing technologies, some being represented by multiple finalists.

=== Biochar ===
Biochar, created by pyrolysis of biomass. Pyrolysis is a process where biomass is partially combusted in an oxygen-limited environment, which produces a char rich in carbon. This char can be distributed in soils as a soil amendment.

Finalists competing with biochar designs:

- Biochar Solutions, US
- Black Carbon, Denmark
- Circle Biochar, US

=== BECCS (Bio-energy with carbon capture and storage) ===
Bio-energy with carbon capture and storage (BECCS) combines combustion or processing of biomass with geologic carbon capture and storage. BECCS is applied to industries such as electrical power, combined heat and power, pulp and paper, ethanol production, and biogas production.

There is 550 000 tonnes CO_{2}/year in total BECCS capacity operating, divided between three different facilities (as of January 2012).

BECCS was pointed out in the IPCC Fourth Assessment Report by the Intergovernmental Panel on Climate Change (IPCC) as a key technology for reaching low carbon dioxide atmospheric concentration targets. The negative emissions that can be produced by BECCS has been estimated by the Royal Society to be equivalent to a 50 to 150 ppm decrease in global atmospheric carbon dioxide concentrations and according to the International Energy Agency, the BLUE map climate change mitigation scenario calls for more than 2 gigatonnes of negative CO_{2} emissions per year with BECCS in 2050. According to the OECD, "Achieving lower concentration targets (450 ppm) depends significantly on the use of BECCS".

The sustainable technical potential for net negative emissions with BECCS has been estimated to 10 Gt of CO_{2} equivalent annually, with an economic potential of up to 3.5 Gt of CO_{2} equivalent annually at a cost of less than 50 €/tonne, and up to 3.9 Gt of CO_{2} equivalent annually at a cost of less than 100 €/tonne.

Imperial College London, the UK Met Office Hadley Centre for Climate Prediction and Research, the Tyndall Centre for Climate Change Research, the Walker Institute for Climate System Research, and the Grantham Institute for Climate Change issued a joint report on carbon dioxide removal technologies as part of the AVOID: Avoiding dangerous climate change research program, stating that "Overall, of the technologies studied in this report, BECCS has the greatest maturity and there are no major practical barriers to its introduction into today’s energy system. The presence of a primary product will support early deployment."

Finalist competing with BECCS design:

- Biorecro, Sweden

=== Direct air capture ===
Direct Air Capture is the process of capturing carbon dioxide directly from ambient air using solvents, filters or other methods. Subsequent to being captured, the carbon dioxide would be stored with carbon capture and storage technologies to keep it permanently out of the atmosphere.

Finalists competing with direct air capture designs:

- Carbon Engineering, Canada
- Climeworks, Switzerland
- Coaway, US
- Global Thermostat, US
- Kilimanjaro Energy, US

=== Enhanced weathering ===
Enhanced weathering refers to a chemical approach to in-situ carbonation of silicates, where carbon dioxide is combined through natural weathering processes with mined minerals, such as olivine. The idea was based on the work of Dutch geoscientist Olaf Schuiling, whose ideas continue to be explored in the Netherlands, with promising results.

Finalist competing with enhanced weathering design:

- Smartstones – Olivine Foundation, The Netherlands

=== Grassland restoration ===
Changed management methods for grasslands can significantly increase the uptake of carbon dioxide into the soil, creating a carbon sink. This and other land use change methods is not generally considered among negative emission technologies because of uncertain long-term sequestration permanence.

Finalist competing with grassland restoration design:

- The Savory Institute, US after receiving criticism from many respected scientists has been removed from the finalist list and no longer appears on the Virgin Earth Challenge website.

== Discontinuance ==
The finalists who were announced in 2011 were kept in suspension for nine years, with many additional requests for information and data, as contestant Global Thermostat reported. Another contestant, Carbon Engineering received notification in 2019 that they fulfilled all technical criteria and were selected for the final judgment. Subsequently they were informed that the prize was "indefinitely put on hold". At the end of 2019, the prize was discontinued and the website taken offline. Carbon Engineering was informed by the Virgin Earth Challenge that "the market conditions necessary to support commercial and sustainable investment in the relevant carbon removal techniques were not foreseeable". Nevertheless, Carbon Engineering had raised 95 million dollar in investments by other parties, including Bill Gates. Contestant Graciela Chichilnisky of Global Thermostat, another direct air capture contestant, who had raised 60 million dollars in investments from other parties, expressed strong criticism in Dutch daily Volkskrant: "If you want to encourage scientific progress with a prize, it's not enough to open your mouth and say "25 million dollars." None of the 11 finalists received any funding or concrete help from Virgin during the 13 years of assessment.

== Similar competitions ==
Since the Virgin Earth Challenge, two new multimillion climate technology contests have been announced. In 2015, NRG COSIA Carbon XPRIZE was launched. It awards $20 million to "breakthrough technologies to convert CO_{2} emissions into usable products". The prize focuses on commercial exploitation of the carbon capture process. The prize will be awarded in the winter of 2021. In 2021, Elon Musk of Tesla Inc announced a $100 million prize for development of the best technology to capture carbon dioxide emissions.

== See also ==
- Bio-energy with carbon capture and storage (BECCS)
- Biochar
- Carbon dioxide removal
- Carbon negative
- Carbon sequestration
- Carbon War Room (also established by Richard Branson)
- Climate engineering (also called geoengineering and climate intervention)
- Enhanced weathering
- Negative carbon dioxide emission
- List of environmental awards
