= Calcium selenide =

Identifiers
CAS Number	1305-84-6
3D model (JSmol)	Interactive image
ChemSpider	8305457
ECHA InfoCard	100.013.765
EC Number	215-141-5
PubChem CID	102107
UNII	P0EY54309M
CompTox Dashboard (EPA)	DTXSID6061650
- InChI: InChI=1S/Ca.Se/q+2;-2 Key: QDVBBRPDXBHZFM-UHFFFAOYSA-N
- SMILES: [Ca+2].[Se-2]

Properties
Chemical formula	CaSe
Molar mass	119.038 g/mol

Hazards
- GHS labelling
Pictograms	(GHS08: Health hazard) (GHS09: Environmental hazard)
Signal word	Danger
Hazard statements	H301, H331, H373, H410
Precautionary statements	P260, P264, P270, P271, P273, P301+P316, P304+P340, P316, P319, P321, P330, P391, P403+P233, P405, P501
- Except where otherwise noted, data are given for materials in their standard state (at 25 °C [77 °F], 100 kPa). Infobox references

Calcium selenide (CaSe) is a chemical compound consisting of the elements calcium and selenium in equal stoichiometric ratio.

== Preparation and properties ==
Calcium selenide can be prepared via the reaction of calcium and H_{2}Se in liquid NH_{3}.

Ca + H_{2}Se → CaSe + H_{2}

Calcium selenide reacts with indium(III) selenide in vacuum at high temperature to give CaIn_{2}Se_{4}.

CaSe + In_{2}Se_{3} → CaIn_{2}Se_{4}
