= Post-combustion capture =

Post-combustion capture refers to the removal of carbon dioxide (CO_{2}) from a power station flue gas prior to its compression, transportation and storage in suitable geological formations, as part of carbon capture and storage. A number of different techniques are applicable, almost all of which are adaptations of acid gas removal processes used in the chemical and petrochemical industries. Many of these techniques existed before World War II and, consequently, post-combustion capture is the most developed of the various carbon-capture methodologies.

Post-combustion capture plant should aim to maximise the capture of CO_{2} emissions from combustion plant and delivery it to secure sequestration in geological strata. Typically, a plant will aim to achieve a CO_{2} capture rate of >95%. To meet the required specification, the following should be monitored:

- CO_{2} mass balance
- CO_{2} in fuel combusted
- Total CO_{2} capture level (as a percentage)
- CO_{2} released to the environment
- CO_{2} quality

CO_{2} can be transported either as gas phase at about 35 barg or as dense phase at 100 barg. The CO_{2} stream should meet or exceed gas quality standards.

CO_{2} absorbents include primary amines which require more heat for regeneration than secondary amines However, secondary amines may form nitrosamines with Nitrogen oxides NOx in the flue gases. All non-solvent constituents must be removed from the solvent. Pilot or full-scale tests using actual flue gases and solvents may be performed.

Calcium looping is a promising second generation post-combustion capture technology in which calcium oxide, often referred to as the "sorbent", is used to separate CO_{2} from the flue gas. The ANICA project focuses on developing a novel indirectly heated carbonate lopping process for lowering the energy penalty and CO_{2} avoidance costs for CO_{2} capture from lime and cement plants.
