= Calcium looping =

Carbon dioxide capture technology

Calcium looping (CaL), or the regenerative calcium cycle (RCC), is a second-generation carbon capture technology. It is the most developed form of carbonate looping, where a metal (M) is reversibly reacted between its carbonate form (MCO_{3}) and its oxide form (MO) to separate carbon dioxide from other gases coming from either power generation or an industrial plant. For this reason, calcium looping is also known as carbonate looping. In the calcium looping process, the two species are calcium carbonate (CaCO_{3}) and calcium oxide (CaO). The captured carbon dioxide can then be transported to a storage site, used in enhanced oil recovery or used as a chemical feedstock. Calcium oxide is often referred to as the sorbent.

Calcium looping is being developed as it is a more efficient, less toxic alternative to current post-combustion capture processes such as amine scrubbing. It also has interesting potential for integration with the cement industry, as well as waste incineration and waste-to-energy plants.

== Basic concept ==
CaCO_{3} ⇌ CaO + CO_{2} ΔH = +178 kJ/mol	1

There are two main steps in CaL:

- Calcination: Solid calcium carbonate is fed into a calciner, where it is heated to 850-950 °C to cause it to thermally decompose into gaseous carbon dioxide and solid calcium oxide (CaO). The almost-pure stream of CO_{2} is then removed and purified so that it is suitable for storage or use. This is the 'forward' reaction in the equation above.
- Carbonation: The solid CaO is removed from the calciner and fed into the carbonator. It is cooled to approximately 650 °C and is brought into contact with a flue gas containing a low to medium concentration of CO_{2}. The CaO and CO_{2} react to form CaCO_{3}, thus reducing the CO_{2} concentration in the flue gas to a level suitable for emission to the atmosphere. This is the 'backward' reaction in the equation above.

Note that carbonation is calcination in reverse.

Whilst the process can be theoretically performed an infinite number of times, the calcium oxide sorbent degrades as it is cycled. For this reason, it is necessary to remove (purge) some of the sorbent from the system and replace it with fresh sorbent (often in the carbonate form). The size of the purge stream compared with the amount of sorbent going round the cycle affects the process considerably.

== Background ==
In the Ca-looping process, a CaO-based sorbent, typically derived from limestone, reacts via the reversible reaction described in Equation (1) and is repeatedly cycled between two vessels.

The forward, endothermic step is called calcination while the backward, exothermic step is carbonation.

A typical Ca-looping process for post-combustion CO_{2} capture is shown in Figure 1, followed by a more detailed description.

Flue gas containing CO_{2} is fed to the first vessel (the carbonator), where carbonation occurs. The CaCO_{3} formed is passed to another vessel (the calciner). Calcination occurs at this stage, and the regenerated CaO is quickly passed back to the carbonator, leaving a pure CO_{2} stream behind. As this cycle continues, CaO sorbent is constantly replaced by fresh (reactive) sorbent. The highly concentrated CO_{2} from the calciner is suitable for sequestration, and the spent CaO has potential uses elsewhere, most notably in the cement industry. The heat necessary for calcination can be provided by oxy-combustion of coal below.

Oxy-combustion of coal: Pure oxygen rather than air is used for combustion, eliminating the large amount of nitrogen in the flue-gas stream. After particulate matter is removed, flue gas consists only of water vapor and CO_{2}, plus smaller amounts of other pollutants. After compression of the flue gas to remove water vapor and additional removal of air pollutants, a nearly pure CO_{2} stream suitable for storage is produced.

The carbonator's operating temperature of 650-700 °C is chosen as a compromise between higher equilibrium (maximum) capture at lower temperatures due to the exothermic nature of the carbonation step, and a decreased reaction rate. Similarly, the temperature of >850 °C in the calcinator strikes a balance between increased rate of calcination at higher temperatures and reduced rate of degradation of CaO sorbent at lower temperatures.

== Process description ==
CaL is usually designed using a dual fluidised bed system to ensure sufficient contact between the gas streams and the sorbent. The calciner and carbonator are fluidised beds with associated process equipment for separating the gases and solids attached (such as cyclones). Calcination is an endothermic process and as such requires the application of heat to the calciner. The opposite reaction, carbonation, is exothermic and heat must be removed. Since the exothermic reaction happens at about 650 °C and the endothermic reaction at 850-950 °C, the heat from the carbonator cannot be directly used to heat the calciner.

The fluidisation of the solid bed in the carbonator is achieved by passing the flue gas through the bed. In the calciner, some of the recovered CO_{2} is recycled through the system. Some oxygen may also be passed through the reactor if fuel is being burned in the calciner to provide energy.

=== Provision of energy to the calciner ===
Heat can be provided for the endothermic calcination step either directly or indirectly.

Direct provision of heat involves the combustion of fuel in the calciner itself (fluidised bed combustion). This is generally assumed to be done under oxy-fuel conditions; i.e. oxygen rather than air is used to burn the fuel to prevent dilution of the CO_{2} with nitrogen. The provision of oxygen for the combustion uses much electricity and is associated with high investment costs. Other air separation processes are being developed.

The penalties of calcium looping may be reduced by providing the heat for the calcination indirectly. This can be done in one of the following ways:

- Combustion of fuel in an external chamber and conduction of energy in to the vessel
- Combustion of fuel in an external chamber and use of a heat transfer medium.

Indirect methods are generally less efficient but do not require the provision of oxygen for combustion within the calciner to prevent dilution. The flue gas from the combustion of fuel in the indirect method could be mixed with the flue gas from the process that the CaL plant is attached to and passed through the carbonator to capture the CO_{2}.

One efficient way of transferring heat into the calciner is by means of heat pipes. The indirectly heated calcium looping (IHCaL) using heat pipes has high potential to decarbonize the lime and cement industry. The deployment of this technology with refuse-derived fuels would allow to achieve net negative CO_{2} emissions.

== Recovery of energy from the carbonator ==
Although the heat from the carbonator is not at a high enough temperature to be used in the calciner, the high temperatures involved (>600 °C) mean that a relatively efficient Rankine cycle for generating electricity can be operated.

Note that the waste heat from the market-leading amine scrubbing CO_{2} capture process is emitted at a maximum of 150 °C. The low temperature of this heat means that it contains much less exergy and can generate much less electricity through a Rankine or organic Rankine cycle.

This electricity generation is one of the main benefits of CaL over lower-temperature post-combustion capture processes as the electricity is an extra revenue stream (or reduces costs).

== Sorbent degradation ==
It has been shown that the activity of the sorbent reduces quite markedly in laboratory, bench-scale and pilot plant tests. This degradation has been attributed to three main mechanisms, as shown below.

=== Attrition ===
Calcium oxide is friable, that is, quite brittle. In fluidised beds, the calcium oxide particles can break apart upon collision with the other particles in the fluidised bed or the vessel containing it. The problem seems to be greater in pilot plant tests than at a bench scale.

=== Sulfation ===
Sulfation is a relatively slow reaction (several hours) compared with carbonation (<10 minutes); thus it is more likely that SO_{2} will come into contact with CaCO_{3} than CaO. However, both reactions are possible, and are shown below.

Indirect sulfation: CaO + SO_{2} + 1/2 O_{2} → CaSO_{4}
Direct sulfation: CaCO_{3} + SO_{2} + 1/2 O_{2} → CaSO_{4} + CO_{2}

Because calcium sulfate has a greater molar volume than either CaO or CaCO_{3} a sulfated layer will form on the outside of the particle, which can prevent the uptake of CO_{2} by the CaO further inside the particle. Furthermore, the temperature at which calcium sulfate dissociates to CaO and SO_{2} is relatively high, precluding sulfation's reversibility at the conditions present in CaL.

== Technical implications ==
Calcium looping technology offers several technical advantages over amine scrubbing for carbon capture. Firstly, both carbonator and calciner can use fluidized bed technology, due to the good gas-solid contacting and uniform bed temperature. Fluidized bed technology has already been demonstrated at large scale: large (460MWe) atmospheric and pressurized systems exist, and there is not a need for intensive scaling up as there is for the solvent scrubbing towers used in amine scrubbing.

Also, the calcium looping process is energy efficient. The heat required for the endothermic calcination of CaCO_{3} and the heat required to raise the temperature of fresh limestone from ambient temperature, can be provided by in-situ oxy-fired combustion of fuel in the calciner. Although additional energy is required to separate O_{2} from N_{2}, the majority of the energy input can be recovered because the carbonator reaction is exothermic and CO_{2} from the calciner can be used to power a steam cycle. A solid purge heat exchanger can also be utilized to recover energy from the deactivated CaO and coal ashes from the calciner. As a result, a relatively small efficiency penalty is imposed on the power process, where the efficiency penalty refers to the power losses for CO_{2} compression, air separation and steam generation. It is estimated at 6-8 % points, compared to 9.5-12.5 % from post combustion amine capture.

The main shortcoming of Ca-looping technology is the decreased reactivity of CaO through multiple calcination-carbonation cycles. This can be attributed to sintering and the permanent closure of small pores during carbonation.

=== Closure of small pores ===
The carbonation step is characterized by a fast initial reaction rate abruptly followed by a slow reaction rate (Figure 2). The carrying capacity of the sorbent is defined as the number of moles of CO_{2} reacted in the period of fast reaction rate with respect to that of the reaction stoichiometry for complete conversion of CaO to CaCO_{3}. As seen in Figure 2, while mass after calcination remains constant, the mass change upon carbonation- the carrying capacity- reduces with a large number of cycles. In calcination, porous CaO (molar volume = 16.9 cm^{3}/g) is formed in place of CaCO_{3} (36.9 cm^{3}/g.). On the other hand, in carbonation, the CaCO_{3} formed on the surface of a CaO particle occupies a larger molar volume. As a result, once a layer of carbonate has formed on the surface (including on the large internal surface of porous CaO), it impedes further CO_{2} capture. This product layer grows over the pores and seals them off, forcing carbonation to follow a slower, diffusion dependent mechanism.

=== Sintering ===
CaO is also prone to sintering, or change in pore shape, shrinkage and grain growth during heating. Ionic compounds such as CaO mostly sinter because of volume diffusion or lattice diffusion mechanics. As described by sintering theory, vacancies generated by temperature sensitive defects direct void sites from smaller to larger ones, explaining the observed growth of large pores and the shrinkage of small pores in cycled limestone. It was found that sintering of CaO increases at higher temperatures and longer calcination durations, whereas carbonation time has minimal effect on particle sintering. A sharp increase in sintering of particles is observed at temperatures above 1173 K, causing a reduction in reactive surface area and a corresponding decrease in reactivity.

Solutions: Several options to reduce sorbent deactivation are currently being researched. An ideal sorbent would be mechanically strong, maintain its reactive surface through repeated cycles, and be reasonably inexpensive. Using thermally pre-activated particles or reactivating spent sorbents through hydration are two promising options. Thermally pre-activated particles have been found to retain activity for up to a thousand cycles. Similarly, particles reactivated by hydration show improved long term (after~20 cycles) conversions. Additionally, an optimized make-up strategy can maintain sufficient levels of activity without excessively increasing operating costs.

== Disposal of waste sorbent ==
=== Properties of waste sorbent ===
After cycling several times and being removed from the calcium loop, the waste sorbent will have attrited, sulfated and become mixed with the ash from any fuel used. The amount of ash in the waste sorbent will depend on the fraction of the sorbent being removed and the ash and calorific content of the fuel. The size fraction of the sorbent is dependent on the original size fraction but also the number of cycles used and the type of limestone used.

=== Disposal routes ===
Proposed disposal routes of waste sorbent include:

- Landfill;
- Disposal at sea;
- Use in cement manufacture;
- Use in flue gas desulfurisation (FGD).

The lifecycle CO_{2} emissions for power generation with CaL and the first three disposal techniques have been calculated. Before disposal of the CaO coal power with CaL has a similar level of lifecycle emissions as amine scrubbing but with the CO_{2}-absorbing properties of CaO CaL becomes significantly less polluting. Ocean disposal was found to be the best, but current laws relating to dumping waste at sea prevent this. Next best was use in cement manufacture, reducing emissions over an unabated coal plant by 93%.

==== Use in lime and cement manufacture ====
The manufacture of lime and cement is responsible for approximately 8% of the world's CO_{2} emissions. Around 65% of this CO_{2} comes from the calcination of calcium carbonate as shown earlier in this article, and the rest from fuel combustion. By replacing some or all of the calcium carbonate entering the plant with waste calcium oxide, the CO_{2} caused from calcination can be avoided, as well as some of the CO_{2} from fossil fuel combustion.

This calcium oxide could be sourced from other point sources of CO_{2} such as power stations, but most effort has been focussed on integrating calcium looping with Portland cement manufacture. By replacing the calciner in the cement plant with a calcium looping plant, it should be possible to capture 90% or more of the CO_{2} relatively inexpensively. There are alternative set-ups such as placing the calcium looping plant in the preheater section so as to make the plant as efficient as possible or to indirectly heat the calciner for increased energy efficiency.

Some work has been undertaken into whether calcium looping affects the quality of the Portland cement produced, but results so far seem to suggest that the production of strength-giving phases such as alite are similar for calcium looped and non-calcium looped cement.

== Direct Separation Technology ==
Calix Ltd has developed a new type of kiln that enables the CO_{2} from the calcination process to be driven off as a pure stream. Calix achieves this by calcining finely ground CaCO_{3} continuously down vertical reactor tubes. The reactor tubes are heated from the outside using electricity or fuel ensuring the CO_{2} stream is pure and not contaminated with air or combustion products.

This technology has been successfully piloted in Europe by a cooperative industry group with support from the European Union as the Low Emission Intensity Lime And Cement (LEILAC1) reactor project. The study report concluded that the technology could capture C02 from full scale lime and cement kilns at €14 to €24/t. Transport and storage costs are not included in this estimate and will be dependent upon infrastructure available near the cement or lime plant

A FEED study is underway for a larger commercial demonstration kiln proposed for the Heidelberg Cement plant in Hannover (LEILAC2). This commercial demonstration kiln is designed to capture 100ktpa CO_{2}. Leilac-2 passed its Financial Investment Decision (FID) in March 2022, and its Front End Engineering Design (FEED) Study Summary was completed and published on 13 October 2023, leading to a new and improved design and revised timeline. The next milestone is procurement of long lead items, currently underway (2023).

This type of kiln is also being studied as a potential method to decarbonise shipping through both looping and single use processes. The single use process would involve using CaCO_{3} to be sown over the ocean, thereby permanently capturing addition carbon from the ocean as the CaCO_{3} reacts to form Ca(HCO_{3})_{2} and reversing ocean acidification.

== Economic implications ==
Calcium looping has several economic advantages.

=== Cost per metric ton for CO_{2} captured ===
Firstly, Ca-looping offers greater cost advantage compared to conventional amine-scrubbing technologies. The cost/metric ton for CO_{2} captured through Ca-looping is ~$23.70 whereas that for CO_{2} captured through amine scrubbing is about $35–$96. This can be attributed to the high availability and low cost of the CaO sorbent (derived from limestone) as compared to MEA. Also, Ca-looping imposes a lower energy penalty than amine scrubbing, resulting in lower energy costs. The amine scrubbing process is energy intensive, with approximately 67% of the operating costs going into steam requirements for solvent regeneration. A more detailed comparison of Ca-looping and amine scrubbing is shown below.

Comparison of Ca-looping and Amine Scrubbing
	Amine Scrubbing	Ca-Looping
Cost/CO_{2} avoided	~ $35–96/ton	~$23.70/ ton
Raw material cost	$1,250/ton MEA	$25/ton CaCO_{3}
Efficiency Penalty	6-12%	6-8%

=== Cost of CO_{2} emissions avoided through Ca-looping ===
In addition, the cost of CO_{2} emissions avoided through Ca-looping is lower than the cost of emissions avoided via an oxyfuel combustion process (~US$23.8/t). This can be explained by the fact that, despite the capital costs incurred in constructing the carbonator for Ca-looping, CO_{2} will not only be captured from the oxy-fired combustion, but also from the main combustor (before the carbonator). The oxygen required in the calciners is only 1/3 that required for an oxyfuel process, lowering air separation unit capital costs and operating costs. Sensitivity Analysis: Figure 3 shows how varying 8 separate parameters affects the cost/metric ton of CO_{2} captured through Ca-looping. It is evident that the dominant variables that affect cost are related to sorbent use, the Ca/C ratio and the CaO deactivation ratio. This is because the large sorbent quantities required dominate the economics of the capture process. Low costs of CO_{2} avoided for the indirectly heated Ca-looping process have been reported for integrated concepts in the lime production.

These variables should therefore be taken into account to achieve further cost reductions in the Ca-looping process. The cost of limestone is largely driven by market forces, and is outside the control of the plant. Currently, carbonators require a Ca/C ratio of 4 for effective CO_{2} capture. However, if the Ca/C ratio or CaO deactivation is reduced (i.e. the sorbent can be made to work more efficiently), the reduction in material consumption and waste can lower feedstock demand and operating costs.

=== Cement production ===
Finally, favorable economics can be achieved by using the purged material from the calcium looping cycle in cement production. The raw feed for cement production includes ~ 85 wt% limestone with the remaining material consisting of clay and additives (e.g. SiO_{2}, Al_{2}O_{3} etc.). The first step in the process involves calcinating limestone to produce CaO, which is then mixed with other materials in a kiln to produce clinker.

Using purged material from a Ca-looping system would reduce the raw material costs for cement production. Waste CaO and ash can be used in place of CaCO_{3} (the main constituent cement feed). The ash could also fulfill the aluminosilicate requirements otherwise supplied by additives. Since over 60% of the energy used in cement production goes into heat input for the precalciner, this integration with Ca-looping and the consequent reduced need for a calcination step, could lead to substantial energy savings (EU, 2001). However, there are problems with using the waste CaO in cement manufacture. If the technology is applied on a large scale, the purge rate of CaO should be optimized to minimize waste.

=== Waste incineration ===
There are two main approaches to capturing CO_{2} from waste incineration facilities and waste-to-energy (WtE) plants. The first one is by using a tail-end CaL process to retrofit existing plants at the back-end. This has the advantage of avoiding excessive modifications of the existing facility, but can significantly increase the space requirements. A second option is to integrate the CaL process by replacing an existing incineration line. In this configuration, the calciner is fired with pre-treated waste, contributing to the waste incineration capacity to the plant. This integrated concept has several advantages, including less space requirements and lower investment costs. The integrated CaL configuration has the lowest CO_{2} avoidance costs of any capture technology for WtE plants due to the fact that it utilizes waste to obtain the energy for the separation. The avoidance costs have been estimated at 27 €_{2024}/t_{CO2,av}.

== Political and environmental implications ==
To fully gauge the viability of calcium looping as a capture process, it is necessary to consider the political, environmental, and health effects of the process as well.

=== Political implications ===
Though many recent scientific reports (e.g.: the seven-wedge stabilization plan by Pacala and Socolow) convey an urgent need to deploy CCS, this urgency has not spread to the political establishment, mainly due to the high costs and energy penalty of CCS The economics of calcium looping are integral to its political viability. One economic and political advantage is the ability for Ca-looping to be retrofitted onto existing power plants, rather than requiring new plants to be built. The IEA sees power plants as an important target for carbon capture, and has set the goal to have all fossil fuel based power plants deploy CCS systems by 2040. However, power plants are expensive to build, and long lived. Retrofitting of post-combustion capture systems, such as Ca-looping, seems to be the only politically and economically viable way to achieve the IEA's goal.

A further political advantage is the potential synergy between calcium looping and cement production. An IEA report concludes that to meet emission reduction goals, there should be 450 CCS projects in India and China by 2050. However, this could be politically difficult, especially with these nations' numerous other development goals. After all, for a politician to commit money to CCS might be less advantageous than to commit it to job schemes or agricultural subsidies. Here, the integration of calcium looping with the prosperous and (particularly with infrastructure expansion in the developing world) vital cement industry might prove compelling to the political establishment.

This potential synergy with the cement industry also provides environmental benefits by simultaneously reducing the waste output of the looping process and decarbonizing cement production. Cement manufacture is energy and resource intensive, consuming 1.5 tonnes of material per tonne of cement produced. In the developing world, economic growth will drive infrastructure growth, increasing cement demand. Deploying a waste product for cement production could therefore have a large, positive environmental impact.

=== Environmental implications ===
The starting material for calcium looping is limestone, which is environmentally benign and widely available, accounting for over 10% (by volume) of all sedimentary rock. Limestone is already mined and cheaply obtainable. The mining process has no major known adverse environmental effects, beyond the unavoidable intrusiveness of any mining operation. However, as the following calculation shows, despite integration with cement industry, waste from Ca-looping can still be a problem.

From the environmental and health standpoint, Ca-looping compares favorably with amine scrubbing. Amine scrubbing is known to generate air pollutants, including amines and ammonia, which can react to form carcinogenic nitrosamines. Calcium looping, on the other hand, does not produce harmful pollutants. In addition, not only does it capture CO_{2}, but it also removes the pollutant SO_{2} from the flue gas. This is both an advantage and disadvantage, as the air quality improves, but the captured SO_{2} has a detrimental effect on the cement that is generated from the calcium looping wastes.

== Advantages and drawbacks ==
=== Advantages of the process ===
Calcium looping is considered as potential promising solutions to reduce CO_{2} capture energy penalty. There are many advantages from the calcium looping methods. Firstly, the method has been proved to yield a low efficiency penalties (5-8% points) while other mature CO_{2} capture systems yield a higher efficiency penalties (8–12.5%). Moreover, the method is well suited for a wide range of flue gases. Calcium looping is applicable for new builds and retrofits to existing power stations or other stationary industrial CO_{2} sources because the method can be implemented using large-scale circulating fluidized beds while other methods such as amine scrubbing is required a vastly upscale solvent scrubbing towers. In addition, crushed limestone used in calcium looping as the sorbent is a natural product, which is well distributed all over the world, non-hazardous and inexpensive. Many cement manufacturers or power plants located close to limestone sources could conceivably employ Calcium looping for CO_{2} capture. The waste sorbent can be used in cement manufacture. Finally, since CaL can be realized with fluidized bed reactors, it is suitable for burning pre-treated municipal solid waste, making it one of the most promising technologies for capturing CO2 from waste incineration and waste-to-energy plants.

=== Drawbacks ===
Apart from these advantages, there are several disadvantages needed to take into considerations. The plant integrating Ca-Looping might require a high construction investment because of the high thermal power of the post-combustion calcium loop. The sorbent capacity decreases significantly with the number of cycles for every carbonation-calcination cycle so the calcium-looping unit will require a constant flow of limestone. In order to increase the long-term reactivity of the sorbent or to reactivate the sorbent, some methods are under investigation such as thermal pretreatment, chemical doping and the production of artificial sorbents. The method applying the concept of fluidized bed reactor, but there are some problems causing the uncertainty for the process. Attrition of the limestone can be a problem during repeated cycling.

== Benefits of calcium looping compared with other post-combustion capture processes ==
Calcium looping compares favorably with several post-combustion capture technologies. Amine scrubbing is the capture technology closest to being market-ready, and calcium looping has several marked benefits over it. When modeled on a 580 MW coal-fired power plant, Calcium looping experienced not only a smaller efficiency penalty (6.7-7.9% points compared to 9.5% for monoethanolamine and 9% for chilled ammonia) but also a less complex retrofitting process. Both technologies would require the plant to be retrofitted for adoption, but the calcium looping retrofitting process would result in twice the net power output of the scrubbing technology. Furthermore, this advantage can be compounded by introducing technology such as cryogenic O_{2} separation systems. This ups the efficiency of the calcium looping technology by increasing the energy density by 57.4%, making the already low energy penalties even less of an issue.

Calcium looping already has an energy advantage over amine scrubbing, but the main problem is that amine scrubbing is the more market-ready technology. However, the accompanying infrastructure for amine scrubbing include large solvent scrubbing towers, the likes of which have never been used on an industrial scale. The accompanying infrastructure for calcium looping capture technologies are circulating fluidized beds, which have already been implemented on an industrial scale. Although the individual technologies differ in terms of current technological viability, the fact that the infrastructure needed to properly implement an amine scrubbing system has yet to be developed keeps calcium looping competitive from a viability standpoint.
