= Balance Eco =

Balance Eco Ltd
- Industry: Climate tech, environmental services
- Founded: 2014
- Headquarters: 20 Chamberlain Street, Wells, Somerset
- Area served: Worldwide
- Products: Balance Units
- Website: balance.eco

Balance Eco Ltd is a company that develops and promotes projects intended to address biodiversity loss, climate change and community development through the adoption of Balance Units. The company describes its approach as a three-pillar model combining biodiversity restoration, community income and carbon removal.

== Activities ==
Balance Eco developed a system known as the Balance Methodology, which it says is intended to address the environmental and social effects of greenhouse gas emissions that are difficult to avoid. The methodology was developed by Balance together with academic partners, and was subsequently subjected to peer review and published in the International Journal of Sustainable Energy. The methodology combines three areas:

- biodiversity restoration;
- economic benefits for local communities; and
- removal of carbon dioxide from the atmosphere.

The company markets units generated under this system as Balance Units. According to Balance Eco, each unit represents an investment in a project intended to generate biodiversity benefits, provide income for local communities and remove one tonne of carbon dioxide from the atmosphere over the project's stated lifetime.

The company offers carbon footprint calculators intended to estimate the carbon impact of businesses and individuals, including a sector-based calculator for small and medium-sized enterprises, an assessment-based service for companies with measured Scope 1, 2 and 3 emissions, and a calculator for individuals.

== Projects ==
Balance Eco is involved in a number of domestic and international afforestation projects, including the Loch Ness/Corriegarth Estate and Ruallan Forest in Scotland, the Blue Slate Wood in Lancashire, and the Paskaia restoration forests in Honduras.

== History and leadership ==
Balance was founded in 2014 (under the name Chant Live, changing to 'Balance Eco' in 2020) by the environmentalist and entrepreneur Daniel B.J. Morrell, who is also the company's chief executive officer. Morrell has a long-established reputation in the sustainability and carbon capture industry, founding and co-founding a number of companies in this sector including Future Forests, Global Cool, Carbon Gold, and the Carbon Advisory Service. Morrell is also credited with co-coining the term Carbon Neutral and trading the first ever carbon offset in 1989.
