= Daniel B.J. Morrell =

British environmental campaigner, entrepreneur and artist

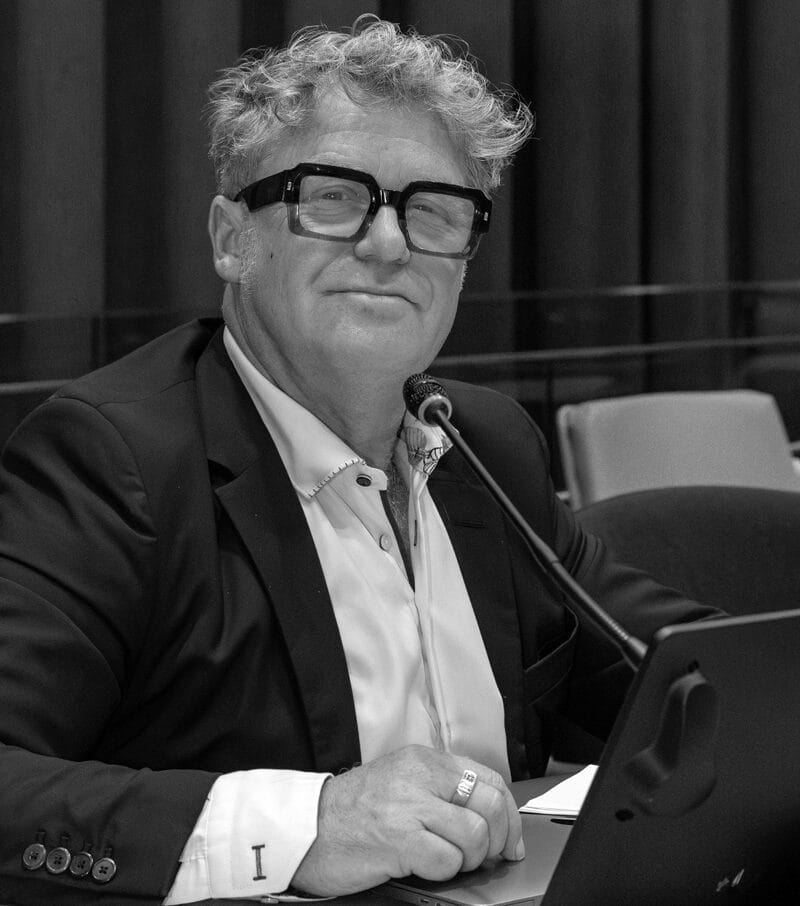
Balance founder Daniel Morrell

Daniel B. J. Morrell is a British environmental campaigner, entrepreneur and artist. He is associated with the development of voluntary carbon-offsetting initiatives and with projects involving forest restoration, biodiversity and climate change mitigation. Sources have credited Morrell with coining or co-coining the term carbon neutral alongside Rima Sams.

== Early life ==
Morrell grew up in Italy and north London. He was educated at Saint Christopher School in Hertfordshire.

Following a serious car accident in 1986, Morrell developed an interest in climate change and environmental issues. During the late 1980s he began planting trees as a means of offsetting carbon dioxide emissions. According to published accounts, the first tree was planted above Castle Cary overlooking Glastonbury Tor for a local resident, Maureen. This initiative was later referenced by Nicholas Stern during his opening address at the 2012 United Nations Climate Change Conference (COP18).

According to Gabriel Ware's Balance™ Methodology Part One, Morrell and Rima Sams co-coined the term carbon neutral. Morrell subsequently trademarked the expression. The term carbon neutral was selected as the Oxford University Press Word of the Year in the United States for 2006.

== Career ==
=== Future Forests ===
In 1992 Morrell founded Future Forests, a company established to help businesses measure and mitigate their greenhouse gas emissions through forestry-based carbon offsetting. The company was an early participant in the voluntary carbon market.

Following a meeting with Joe Strummer at the Glastonbury Festival in 1995, Future Forests worked with the musician on a carbon-offsetting initiative that resulted in the planting of "Rebel's Wood" on the Isle of Skye. The company subsequently worked with musicians and businesses including Pink Floyd, The Rolling Stones, Avis, Mazda and Sky on carbon management and offsetting initiatives.

Future Forests later became The CarbonNeutral Company, before ultimately becoming Climate Impact Partners.

=== Global Cool ===
In 2006 Morrell founded Global Cool, a climate-awareness campaign intended to encourage public engagement with environmental issues. The initiative was launched at a reception at 10 Downing Street where Stephen Fry delivered the opening address during the premiership of Tony Blair.

=== Carbon Gold ===
In 2007 Morrell co-founded Carbon Gold with entrepreneur Craig Sams. The company promotes the use of biochar as a means of improving soil quality while sequestering carbon.

The environmental benefits of biochar have been discussed by scientists including Tim Flannery, who described it as having the potential to address climate, energy, food and water challenges simultaneously.

=== Carbon Advisory Service ===
Also in 2007, Morrell founded the Carbon Advisory Service, an environmental consultancy specialising in reducing the carbon emissions of existing and new buildings through improvements in design and energy efficiency. Its clients have included Shell, Soneva, Six Senses and the Government of the Maldives.

=== Balance Eco ===
Morrell is the founder and chief executive of Balance Eco Ltd, an environmental company whose activities include biodiversity restoration, forest creation and carbon removal projects.

He is the lead author of the paper Converting Carbon Finance into Biodiversity Creation, published in the International Journal of Sustainable Energy.

The methodology proposes integrating biodiversity restoration, community livelihoods and carbon removal within a single environmental framework.

Balance Eco is certified as a B Corporation.

=== Music and art ===
==== Fullview Productions ====
During the 1990s Morrell operated Fullview Productions, a music production company that licensed pre-release recordings for use in advertising campaigns, including advertisements for Guinness and Blackcurrant Tango.

==== Separate Cinema ====
In 1994 Morrell collaborated with photographer and film historian John Kisch on 'Separate Cinema, an exhibition presented at the British Film Institute that examined the history of African-American cinema using material from the Separate Cinema Archive.

==== Balance Live and the Balance Artist Collective ====
Morrell subsequently established Balance Live, an initiative that develops methodologies for measuring and reducing the environmental impact of live events, including audience travel. Its Our Touring Methodology has been published as a preprint.

Morrell also developed CHANT, a participatory art and music project associated with Balance forests that combines tree-planting with public musical collaboration. Contributors have included Andy Mackay, Martin Ware, Martin "Youth" Glover and Don Letts.

According to Balance Recordings, the Balance Artist Collective is part of a creative movement Morrell calls "Space Punk", a concept-genre based on a philosophy that the art has been "downloaded" from ten decades in the future.

The collective's debut album, Relics of Tree Worship (In Dub), was released by Balance Recordings in a limited double-LP edition for Record Store Day on 18 April 2026. It features contributions from Martin "Youth" Glover, Gaudi, Lee "Scratch" Perry, Kermit Leveridge, Don Letts, Dan Morrell and Planetman. The Record Store Day edition was issued on eco-vinyl. In June 2026, the collective reported planting 120 trees at Nine Mile, Reggae Land, Jamaica, the birthplace and final resting place of Bob Marley.

The album received a four-star review from Kris Needs in the July 2026 issue of Record Collector, a three-star review in the July 2026 issue of Mojo, and a three-star review from Beth Simpson in the August 2026 issue of Classic Pop.

A follow-up album, Relics of Tree Worship in Dub (Gaudi & Don Letts Roots Dub Plates), was released digitally on 18 September 2026, with a launch event announced for Stonehenge on 21 September. It features the original concept recordings for the debut album, remixed by Gaudi and Don Letts.
