= List of American films of 1973 =

This is a list of American films released in 1973.

== Box office ==
The highest-grossing American films released in 1973, by domestic box office gross revenue as estimated by The Numbers, are as follows:

Highest-grossing films of 1973
Rank	Title	Distributor	Domestic gross
1	The Exorcist	Warner Bros.	$193,000,000
2	The Sting	Universal	$159,616,327
3	American Graffiti	Universal	$115,291,850
4	Papillon	Allied Artists	$53,267,000
5	The Way We Were	Columbia	$49,919,870
6	Magnum Force	Warner Bros.	$44,680,473
7	Live and Let Die	United Artists	$35,400,000
8	Robin Hood	Walt Disney	$32,056,467
9	Paper Moon	Paramount	$30,933,743
10	Serpico	Paramount Pictures	$27,274,150

== January–March ==
Opening		Title	Production company	Cast and crew	Ref.
J A N U A R Y	5	Sweet Kill	New World Pictures / Curtis Lee Hanson; Tamaroc Productions	Curtis Hanson (director/screenplay); Tab Hunter, Isabel Jewell, Roberta Collins, John Aprea, Rory Guy, John Pearce, Cherie Latimer, Nadyne Turney, Linda Leider	
J A N U A R Y	10	The No Mercy Man	Cannon Film Distributors	Daniel Vance (director/screenplay); Mike Nolin (screenplay); Steve Sandor, Rockne Tarkington, Sid Haig, Ron Thompson, Mike Lane, Richard X. Slattery, Heidi Vaughn, David Booth, Daniel Oaks, Tom Scott, Michael Prichard, Peg Stewart, Richard Collier, Darlene Feasel, Russell Morrell	
J A N U A R Y	11	The Offence	United Artists / Tantallon	Sidney Lumet (director); John Hopkins (screenplay); Sean Connery, Trevor Howard, Vivien Merchant, Ian Bannen, Peter Bowles, Derek Newark, Ronald Radd, John Hallam, Richard Moore, Anthony Sagar, Maxine Gordon, Howard Goorney, Hilda Fenemore	
J A N U A R Y	13	Battles Without Honor and Humanity	Toei	Kinji Fukasaku (director); Kazuo Kasahara (screenplay); Bunta Sugawara, Hiroki Matsukata, Nobuo Kaneko, Tatsuo Umemiya, Kunie Tanaka, Goro Ibuki, Tamio Kawaji, Tsunehiko Watase, Mayumi Nagisa, Takuzo Kawatani, Shinichiro Mikawi, Harumi Sone, Keiji Takamiya, Toshie Kimura, Asao Uchida, Hiroshi Nawa, Eiko Nakamura, Kinji Nakamura	
J A N U A R Y	13	Manson	American International Pictures	Robert Hendrickson, Laurence Merrick (directors)	
J A N U A R Y	19	Black Mama White Mama	American International Pictures / Four Associates Ltd.	Eddie Romero (director); H.R. Christian (screenplay); Margaret Markov, Pam Grier, Sid Haig, Lynn Borden, Zaldy Zshornack, Eddie Garcia, Alona Alegre, Vic Diaz, Lotis M. Key, Alfonso Carvajal, Ricardo Herrero, Andrés (Andy) Centenera, Laurie Burton, Dondo Fernanco, Wendy Green, Jess Ramos, Carpi Asturias	
J A N U A R Y	25	The Death of a Lumberjack	Les Film Mutuels / Canadian Film Development Corporation / Famous Players Limited	Gilles Carle (director/screenplay); Arthur Lamothe (screenplay); Carole Laure, Willie Lamothe, Daniel Pilon, Pauline Julien, Marcel Sabourin, Roger Lebel, Denise Filiatrault, J. Léo Gagnon, Ernest Guimond, Jacques Gagnon, Gil Laroche, Jacques Bouchard, Yvonne Diabo, Eugene Lahache, Marcel Fournier	
J A N U A R Y	25	The Love Ban	British Lion Films / Welbeck Films	Ralph Thomas (director); Kevin Laffan (screenplay); Hywel Bennett, Nanette Newman, Milo O'Shea, Angharad Rees, Nicky Henson, Georgina Hale, Madeline Smith, Peter Barkworth, John Cleese, Marianne Stone, Nina Baden-Semper, Cheryl Hall, Jacki Piper, Tommy Godfrey, Tony Haygarth, David Howey, James Leith	
J A N U A R Y	27	Adolf Hitler: My Part in His Downfall	United Artists / Associated London Films	Norman Cohen (director/screenplay); Spike Milligan, Johnny Byrne (screenplay); Jim Dale, Arthur Lowe, Bill Maynard, Tony Selby, Geoffrey Hughes, Jim Norton, John Forgeham, Windsor Davies, Spike Milligan, Pat Coombs, Bob Todd, Gregory Phillips, Alvar Liddell, Robert Longden	
J A N U A R Y	27	Last Tango in Paris	United Artists / Produzioni Europee Associati (PEA) / Les Productions Artistes Associés	Bernando Bertolucci (director/screenplay); Franco Arcalli, Agnès Varda (screenplay); Marlon Brando, Maria Schneider, Maria Michi, Giovanna Galletti, Jean-Pierre Léaud, Massimo Girotti, Catherine Allégret, Catherine Breillat, Darling Légitimus, Veronica Lazăr, Gitt Magrini, Luce Marquand, Dan Diament, Catherine Sola, Mauro Marchetti, Peter Schommer, Marie-Hélène Breillat, Armand Abplanalp, Rachel Kesterber, Ramón Mendizábal, Mimi Pinson, Gérard Lepennec, Stéphane Koziak	
J A N U A R Y	31	Shamus	Columbia Pictures / Robert M. Weitman Productions	Buzz Kulik (director); Barry Beckerman (screenplay); Burt Reynolds, Dyan Cannon, John Ryan, Joe Santos, Giorgio Tozzi, Ron Weyand, Larry Block, Beeson Carroll, Kevin Conway, John Glover, Mickey Freeman, Tommy Lane, Ric Mancini, Frank Sivero, Alex Stevens	
J A N U A R Y	31	Steelyard Blues	Warner Bros.	Alan Myerson (director); David S. Ward (screenplay); Donald Sutherland, Jane Fonda, Peter Boyle, Howard Hesseman, John Savage, Mel Stewart, Roger Bowen, Garry Goodrow, Richard Schaal, Morgan Upton, Jessica Myerson, Dan Morrows, Nancy Fish, Lynette Bernay, Edward Greenberg	
F E B R U A R Y	1	The World's Greatest Athlete	Walt Disney Productions / Buena Vista Distribution	Robert Scheerer (director); Dee Caruso, Gerald Gardner (screenplay); Tim Conway, Jan-Michael Vincent, John Amos, Roscoe Lee Browne, Dayle Haddon, Billy De Wolfe, Nancy Walker, Danny Goldman, Don Pedro Colley, Vito Scotti, Liam Dunn, Ivor Francis, Leon Askin, Joe Kapp, Clarence Muse, Virginia Capers, Philip Ahn, John Lupton, Sarah Selby, Russ Conway, Al Checco, Dick Wilson, Howard Cosell, Frank Gifford, Jim McKay, Bud Palmer, Bill Toomey	
F E B R U A R Y	4	Wattstax	Columbia Pictures / Stax Records / Wolper Productions	Mel Stuart (director); The Staple Singers, Richard Pryor, Carla Thomas, Rufus Thomas, Luther Ingram, Kim Weston, Johnnie Taylor, The Bar-Kays, Isaac Hayes, Albert King, Dale Warren, Tommy Jacquette, Jesse Jackson, Melvin Van Peebles, Jimmy Jones, Eric Mercury, Freddie Robinson, Ernie Hines, Little Sonny, The Temprees, Frederick Knight, William Bell, Eddie Floyd, Rance Allen, David Porter, Tommy Tate, The Soul Children, Fred Williamson, The Dramatics, The Emotions, Little Milton, Mel and Tim, Raymond Allen, Erik Kilpatrick, Ted Lange, Fred Berry, Ossie Davis, Ruby Dee, Billy Eckstine, Felton Pilate, Jackie Robinson, Deborah Manning, Louise McCord, Lee Sain, The Newcomers	
F E B R U A R Y	7	Black Caesar	American International Pictures / Largo	Larry Cohen (director/screenplay); Fred Williamson, Gloria Hendry, Art Lund, D'Urville Martin, Julius Harris, Minnie Gentry, William Wellman Jr., Val Avery, Don Pedro Colley, Myrna Hansen, Philip Roye, James Dixon, Patrick McAllister, Omer Jeffery, Michael Jeffery	
F E B R U A R Y	7	The Train Robbers	Warner Bros. / Batjac Productions	Burt Kennedy (director/screenplay); John Wayne, Ann-Margret, Rod Taylor, Ben Johnson, Christopher George, Bobby Vinton, Jerry Gatlin, Ricardo Montalbán	
F E B R U A R Y	8	The Harder They Come	New World Pictures / International Films Inc.	Perry Henzell (director/screenplay); Trevor D. Rhone (screenplay); Jimmy Cliff, Carl Bradshaw, Ras Daniel Heartman, Winston Stona, Leslie Kong, Prince Buster, Clover Lewis, Ed "Bim" Lewis, Aston "Bam" Wynter, Alton Ellis, Janet Bartley, Basil Keane, Elijah Chambers, Bob Charlton, Volier Johnson, Lucia White, Beverly Anderson, Bobby Loban, Joanne Dunn, Adrian Robinson, Don Topping, Karl Leslie, Sandra Redwood, Ulla Fraser, Carol Lawes	
F E B R U A R Y	9	The Creeping Flesh	Columbia Pictures / World Film Services	Freddie Francis (director); Peter Spenceley, Jonathan Rumbold (screenplay); Christopher Lee, Peter Cushing, Lorna Heilbron, Jenny Runacre, George Benson, Kenneth J. Warren, Duncan Lamont, Harry Locke, Michael Ripper, Robert Swann, David Bailie, Tony Wright, Marianne Stone, Alexandra Dane, Larry Taylor, Sue Bond, Hedger Wallace, Catherine Finn, Maurice Bush, Martin Carroll, Dan Meaden	
F E B R U A R Y	9	Jory	AVCO Embassy Pictures	Jorge Fons (director); Gerald Herman, Robert Irving (screenplay); John Marley, B.J. Thomas, Robby Benson, Claudio Brook, Brad Dexter, Benny Baker, Anne Lockhart, Ted Markland, Linda Purl, Patricia Aspíllaga, Todd Martin, Quintín Bulnes, Carlos Cortés, John Kelly, Eduardo López Rojas	
F E B R U A R Y	14	Save the Tiger	Paramount Pictures / Filmways	John G. Avildsen (director); Steve Shagan (screenplay); Jack Lemmon, Jack Gilford, Laurie Heineman, Norman Burton, Patricia Smith, Thayer David, William Hansen, Harvey Jason, Lin Von Linden, Lara Parker, Eloise Hardt, Ned Glass, Biff Elliot, Madeline Lee, Janina, Pearl Shear, Ben Freedman	
F E B R U A R Y	20	Nothing but the Night	Fox-Rank Distributors	Peter Sasdy (director); Brian Hayles (screenplay); Christopher Lee, Peter Cushing, Diana Dors, Georgia Brown, Keith Barron, Gwyneth Strong, Fulton Mackay, John Robinson, Morris Perry, Michael Gambon, Duncan Lamont, Shelagh Fraser, Kathleen Byron, Andrew McCulloch, Michael Brennan	
F E B R U A R Y	22	Payday	Cinerama Releasing Corporation / Fantasy Films / Fantasy Records / Pumice Finance Company	Daryl Duke (director); Don Carpenter (screenplay); Rip Torn, Ahna Capri, Michael C. Gwynne, Jeff Morris, Cliff Emmich, Sonny Shroyer, Elayne Heilveil, Henry O. Arnold, Bobby Smith, Dallas Smith, Richard Hoffman, Walter Bamberg, Eleanor Fell, Clara Dunn, Linda Spatz, Earle Trigg, Winston McNair, Frazier Moss, Phillip Wende, Ed Neeley	
F E B R U A R Y	22	Turkish Delight	Nederland Film / VNF	Paul Verhoeven (director); Gerard Soeteman (screenplay); Monique van de Ven, Rutger Hauer, Tonny Huurdeman, Hans Boskamp, Dolf de Vries, Wim van den Brink, Manfred de Graaf, Dick Scheffer, Marjol Flore, Bert Dijkstra	
F E B R U A R Y	22	Walking Tall	Cinerama Releasing Corporation / Bing Crosby Productions	Phil Karlson (director); Mort Briskin (screenplay); Joe Don Baker, Elizabeth Hartman, Lurene Tuttle, Noah Beery Jr., Dawn Lyn, Leif Garrett, Felton Perry, Logan Ramsey, Rosemary Murphy, Gene Evans, Bruce Glover, Kenneth Tobey, Don Keefer, Douglas Fowley, Pepper Martin, Ted Jordan, Red West, Brenda Benet, Arch Johnson, Sidney Clute, Russell Thorson, Gil Perkins, Carey Loftin, Gene LeBell, Del Monroe, Richard X. Slattery, Warner Venetz, Ed Call, Richard Donald	
F E B R U A R Y	21	Lolly-Madonna XXX	Metro-Goldwyn-Mayer	Richard C. Sarafian (director); Rodney Carr-Smith, Sue Grafton (screenplay); Rod Steiger, Robert Ryan, Jeff Bridges, Scott Wilson, Season Hubley, Katherine Squire, Joan Goodfellow, Tresa Hughes, Gary Busey, Randy Quaid, Timothy Scott, Kiel Martin, Ed Lauter, Paul Koslo	
F E B R U A R Y	24	The Blood Brothers	Shaw Brothers Studio	Chang Cheh (director/screenplay); Ni Kuang (screenplay); David Chiang, Ti Lung, Chen Kuan Tai, Ching Li	
M A R C H	1	Charlotte's Web	Paramount Pictures / Hanna-Barbera Productions / Sagittarius Productions	Charles A. Nichols, Iwao Takamoto (directors); E.B. White (screenplay); Debbie Reynolds, Henry Gibson, Paul Lynde, Agnes Moorehead, Don Messick, Herb Vigran, Pamelyn Ferdin, Martha Scott, Bob Holt, John Stephenson, Danny Bonaduce, William B. White, Dave Madden, Joan Gerber, Candy Candido, Rex Allen	
M A R C H	1	The Thief Who Came to Dinner	Warner Bros. / Bud Yorkin Productions	Bud Yorkin (director); Walter Hill (screenplay); Ryan O'Neal, Jacqueline Bisset, Warren Oates, Jill Clayburgh, Charles Cioffi, Ned Beatty, Austin Pendleton, Gregory Sierra, Michael Murphy, John Hillerman, Alan Oppenheimer, Margaret Fairchild, Jack Manning, Richard O'Brien, George Morfogen, Army Archerd, John Henry Faulk, Warren Munson, Noble Willingham	
M A R C H	4	Baxter!	National General Pictures / Anglo-EMI Film Distributors / Group W Films / Hanna-Barbera Productions / Performing Arts	Lionel Jeffries (director); Reginald Rose (screenplay); Patricia Neal, Britt Ekland, Lynn Carlin, Jean-Pierre Cassel, Scott Jacoby, Sally Thomsett, Paul Eddington, Paul Maxwell, Ronald Leigh-Hunt, Dorothy Alison, Marianne Stone, Ian Thompson, Frances Bennett, George Tovey	
M A R C H	7	Slither	Metro-Goldwyn-Mayer	Howard Zieff (director): W.D. Richter (screenplay); James Caan, Peter Boyle, Sally Kellerman, Louise Lasser, Allen Garfield, Richard B. Shull, Alex Rocco, Seamon Glass, Diana Darrin, Stuart Nisbet, Virginia Sale, Alex Henteloff, Len Lesser, Garry Goodrow	
M A R C H	7	The Long Goodbye	United Artists / Lion's Gate Films	Robert Altman (director); Leigh Brackett (screenplay); Elliott Gould, Nina van Pallandt, Sterling Hayden, Mark Rydell, Henry Gibson, David Arkin, Jim Bouton, Warren Berlinger, Pancho Córdova, Enrique Lucero, Rutanya Alda, Jack Riley, Jerry Jones, John S. Davies, Ken Sansom, David Carradine, Arnold Schwarzenegger	
M A R C H	8	Ludwig	Metro-Goldwyn-Mayer / Mega Film / Cinétel / Divina Film / Dieter Geissler Filmproduktion / RAI	Luchino Visconti (director/screenplay); Enrico Medioli, Suso Cecchi d'Amico (screenplay); Helmut Berger, Romy Schneider, Silvana Mangano, Trevor Howard, Gert Fröbe, Helmut Griem, Umberto Orsini, John Moulder-Brown, Sonia Petrovna, Folker Bohnet, Heinz Moog, Adriana Asti, Marc Porel, Nora Ricci, Mark Burns, Alexander Allerson, Kurt Großkurth, Gérard Herter, Karl-Heinz Peters, Clara Colosimo, Friedrich von Ledebur, Izabella Teleżyńska, Bert Bloch, Anne-Marie Hanschke, Jan Linhar, Clara Moustawcesky, Gernot Möhner, Wolfram Schaerf, Gunnar Warner, Raika Juri, Karl-Heinz Windhorst	
M A R C H	10	Schlock	Jack H. Harris Enterprises	John Landis (director/screenplay); John Landis, Enrica Blankey, Eliza Garrett, Saul Kahan, Joseph Piantadosi, Richard Gillis, Tom Alvich, Walter Levine, Eric Allison, Ralph Baker, Gene Fox, Susan Weiser, Jonathan A. Flint, Amy Schireson, Belinda Folsey, E.G. Harty	
M A R C H	10	The Vault of Horror	Metromedia Producers Corporation / Amicus Productions	Roy Ward Baker (director); Milton Subotsky (screenplay); Dawn Addams, Tom Baker, Michael Craig, Denholm Elliott, Glynis Johns, Edward Judd, Curt Jürgens, Anna Massey, Daniel Massey, Terry-Thomas, Robin Nedwell, Geoffrey Davies, Terence Alexander, John Witty, Ishaq Bux, John Forbes-Robertson, Maurice Kaufmann, Arthur Mullard, Mike Pratt, Marianne Stone, Erik Chitty, Tommy Godfrey, Jerold Wells, Jasmina Hilton	
M A R C H	12	The Baby	Scotia International / Quintet Productions	Ted Post (director); Abe Polsky (screenplay); Anjanette Comer, Ruth Roman, Marianna Hill, Suzanne Zenor, Tod Andrews, Michael Pataki, Virginia Vincent, Beatrice Manley Blau, Erin O'Reilly, Don Mallon, Joseph Bernard, David Manzy	
M A R C H	15	Tom Sawyer	United Artists / Reader's Digest	Don Taylor (director); Robert B. Sherman, Richard M. Sherman (screenplay); Johnny Whitaker, Celeste Holm, Warren Oates, Jeff East, Jodie Foster, Lucille Benson, Henry Jones, Noah Keen, Dub Taylor, Richard Eastham, Sandy Kenyon, Joshua Hill Lewis, Susan Joyce, Steve Hogg, Sean Summers, Kevin Jefferson, Kunu Hank	
M A R C H	16	The Crazies	Cambist Films / Pittsburgh Films	George A. Romero (director/screenplay); W.G. McMillan, Lynn Lowry, Richard Liberty, Richard France, Ned Schmidtke, Bill Hinzman, Lane Carroll, Harold Wayne Jones, Lloyd Hollar, Harry Spillman, Will Disney, Leland Starnes, Bill Thunhurst, A.C. McDonald, Robert J. McCully, Robert Karlowsky, Tony Scott	
M A R C H	16	Forced Entry	Variety Films / Boojum Productions	Shaun Costello (director/screenplay); Tim Long, Laura Cannon, Jutta David, Shaun Costello, Ruby Runhouse, Nina Fawcett	
M A R C H	17	Lost Horizon	Columbia Pictures / Ross Hunter Productions	Charles Jarrott (director); Larry Kramer (screenplay); Peter Finch, Liv Ullmann, Sally Kellerman, George Kennedy, Michael York, Olivia Hussey, Bobby Van, James Shigeta, Charles Boyer, John Gielgud, Kent Smith, John Van Dreelen, Larry Duran	
M A R C H	18	Two People	Universal Pictures	Robert Wise (director/screenplay); Peter Fonda, Lindsay Wagner, Estelle Parsons, Alan Fudge, Frances Sternhagen, Geoffrey Horne, Nathalie Baye	
M A R C H	21	Godspell	Columbia Pictures	David Greene (director/screenplay); John-Michael Tebelak (screenplay); Victor Garber, David Haskell, Merrell Jackson, Gilmer McCormick, Jeffrey Mylett, Lynne Thigpen, Katie Hanley, Joanne Jonas, Robin Lamont, Jerry Sroka	
M A R C H	23	Charley and the Angel	Walt Disney Productions / Buena Vista Distribution	Vincent McEveety (director); Roswell Rogers (screenplay); Fred MacMurray, Cloris Leachman, Harry Morgan, Kurt Russell, Kathleen Cody, Scott Kolden, Vincent Van Patten, George Lindsey, Edward Andrews, Mills Watson, Richard Bakalyan, Barbara Nichols, Kelly Thordsen, Liam Dunn, Larry D. Mann, George O'Hanlon, Susan Tolsky, Ed Begley Jr., Christina Anderson, Roy Engel, Robert Hastings	
M A R C H	27	Sisters	American International Pictures / Edward R. Pressman Film Corporation	Brian De Palma (director/screenplay); Louisa Rose (screenplay); Margot Kidder, Jennifer Salt, Charles Durning, Bill Finley, Lisle Wilson, Barnard Hughes, Dolph Sweet, Olympia Dukakis, Justine Johnston, Mary Davenport, Catherine Gaffigan	
M A R C H	28	Black Snake	Trident Pictures	Russ Meyer (director/screenplay); Leonard Neubauer (screenplay); Anouska Hempel, David Warbeck, Percy Herbert, Thomas Baptiste, David Prowse, Milton McCollin, Bernard Boston, Vikki Richards	
M A R C H	28	The Devil in Miss Jones	VCX Ltd. / MB Productions	Gerard Damiano (director/screenplay); Georgina Spelvin, Harry Reams, Mark Stevens, Albert Cork, John Clemens, Rick Livermore, Claire Lumiere, Sue Flaken	
M A R C H	28	Kamouraska	New Line Cinema / France Cinéma Productions	Claude Jutra (director/screenplay); Geneviève Bujold, Richard Jordan, Philippe Léotard, Huguette Oligny, Camille Bernard, Janine Sutto, Olivette Thibault, Marcel Cuvelier, Marie Fresnières, Suzie Baillargeon, Colette Cortois, Gigi Duckett, Marcel Marineau, Len Watt	

== April–June ==
Opening		Title	Production company	Cast and crew	Ref.
A P R I L	1	Ace Eli and Rodger of the Skies	20th Century Fox	John Erman (director); Claudia Salter (screenplay); Cliff Robertson, Eric Shea, Pamela Franklin, Bernadette Peters, Rosemary Murphy, Alice Ghostley, Royal Dano, Don Keefer, Patricia Smith, Arthur Malet, Jim Boles, Kelly Jean Peters, Herb Gatlin, Ariane Munker, Hope Summers, Lew Brown, Robert Hamm, Brent Hurst, Rodger Peck, Jan Simms, Dixie Lee, Claudia Bryar, Felicity Van Runkle, Pat O'Connor, Bill Quinn	
A P R I L	4	The Mack	Cinerama Releasing Corporation / Harbor Productions	Michael Campus (director); Robert J. Poole (screenplay); Max Julien, Richard Pryor, Juanita Moore, Carol Speed, Roger E. Mosley, Dick Anthony Williams, Don Gordon, William Watson, George Murdock, Paul Harris, Annazette Chase, Lee Duncan, June Wilkinson, Kai Hernandez, Junero Jennings, Sandra Brown, Christopher Brooks, Fritz Ford, Norma McClure, David Mauro	
A P R I L	5	Theatre of Blood	United Artists / Harbour Productions Limited / Cineman Productions	Douglas Hickox (director); Anthony Greville-Bell (screenplay); Vincent Price, Diana Rigg, Dennis Price, Coral Browne, Ian Hendry, Robert Morley, Jack Hawkins	
A P R I L	7	Night Flight from Moscow	AVCO Embassy Pictures / Pathfinder Pictures / Les Films de la Boétie / Euro International Film / Rialto Film	Henri Verneuil (director/screenplay); Gilles Perrault (screenplay); Yul Brynner, Henry Fonda, Dirk Bogarde, Philippe Noiret, Michel Bouquet, Martin Held, Virna Lisi, Paola Pitagora, Elga Andersen, Marie Dubois, Nathalie Nerval, Farley Granger, Luigi Diberti, Robert Alda	
A P R I L	10	Class of '44	Warner Bros.	Paul Bogart (director); Herman Raucher (screenplay); Gary Grimes, Jerry Houser, Deborah Winters, William Atherton, Sam Bottoms, Murray Westgate, Michael A. Hoey, Oliver Conant	
A P R I L	11	Book of Numbers	AVCO Embassy Pictures / Brut Productions	Raymond St. Jacques (director); Larry Spiegel (screenplay); Raymond St. Jacques, Philip Michael Thomas, Freda Payne, Hope Clarke, D'Urville Martin, Irma P. Hall, Willie Washington Jr., Doug Finell, Sterling St. Jacques, C.L. Williams, Jerry Leon, Gilbert Green, Frank De Sal, Temie Mae Williams, Charles F. Elyston, Queen Esther Gent, Chiquita Jackson, Katie Peters, Pat Peterson, Reginald T. Dorsey	
A P R I L	11	Scarecrow	Warner Bros.	Jerry Schatzberg (director); Garry Michael White (screenplay); Gene Hackman, Al Pacino, Eileen Brennan, Ann Wedgeworth, Richard Lynch, Penelope Allen, Rutanya Alda, Dorothy Tristan, Richard Hackman, Al Cingolani	
A P R I L	12	The Iron Rose	Les Films ABC	Jean Rollin (director/screenplay); Tristan Corbière, Maurice Lemaître (screenplay); Françoise Pascal, Hugues Quester, Nathalie Perrey, Mireille Dargent, Michel Dalessalle	
A P R I L	12	Tiffany Jones	Hemdale / Peter Walker (Heritage)	Pete Walker (director); Alfred Shaughnessy (screenplay); Anouska Hempel, Ray Brooks, Susan Sheers, Damien Thomas, Eric Pohlmann, Richard Marner, Martin Benson, Alan Curtis, John Clive, Geoffrey Hughes, Ivor Salter, Lynda Baron, Nick Zaran, Walter Randall, Martin Wyldeck, Bill Kerr, Tony Sympson	
A P R I L	13	The Candy Snatchers	General Film Corporation / Marmot Productions	Guerdon Trueblood (director); Bryan Gindoff (screenplay); Tiffany Bolling, Ben Piazza, Dolores Dorn, Howard Shoup, Susan Sennett, Brad David, Vince Martorano, Bonnie Boland, Jerry Butts, Leon Charles, Phyllis Major, Bill Woodard, Christophe Trueblood	
A P R I L	18	Bequest to the Nation	Universal Pictures / Hal Wallis Productions	James Cellan Jones (director); Terence Rattigan (screenplay); Glenda Jackson, Peter Finch, Michael Jayston, Anthony Quayle, Margaret Leighton, Dominic Guard, Nigel Stock, Roland Culver, Barbara Leigh-Hunt, Pat Heywood, Clelia Matania, John Nolan	
A P R I L	18	Charley One-Eye	Paramount Pictures / David Paradine Productions	Don Chaffey (director); Keith Leonard (screenplay); Richard Roundtree, Roy Thinnes, Nigel Davenport, Aldo Sambrell, Alexander Davion, David Lodge, William Mervyn, Patrick Mower, Johnny Sekka, Jill Pearson, Luis Aller, Rafael Albaicín	
A P R I L	19	Love and Pain and the Whole Damn Thing	Columbia Pictures	Alan J. Pakula (director); Alvin Sargent (screenplay); Maggie Smith, Timothy Bottoms, Jaime de Mora y Aragón, Charles Baxter, Emiliano Redondo, Margaret Modlin, May Heatherly, Lloyd Brimhall, Elmer Modlin	
A P R I L	19	Scorpio	United Artists / The Mirisch Corporation / Scimitar Films	Michael Winner (director); David W. Rintels, Gerald Wilson (screenplay); Burt Lancaster, Alain Delon, Paul Scofield, John Colicos, Gayle Hunnicutt, J.D. Cannon, Joanne Linville, Mel Stewart, Vladek Sheybal, Mary Maude, Jack Colvin, James B. Sikking, Burke Byrnes, William Smithers, Shmuel Rodensky, Celeste Yarnall, Sandor Elès, Frederick Jaeger, George Mikell, Robert Emhardt	
A P R I L	19	Soylent Green	Metro-Goldwyn-Mayer	Richard Fleischer (director); Stanley R. Greenberg (screenplay); Charlton Heston, Leigh Taylor-Young, Chuck Connors, Joseph Cotten, Brock Peters, Paula Kelly, Edward G. Robinson, Stephen Young, Mike Henry, Lincoln Kilpatrick, Roy Jenson, Leonard Stone, Whit Bissell, Celia Lovsky, Dick Van Patten	
A P R I L	20	Ganja & Hess	Kelly-Jordan Enterprises	Bill Gunn (director/screenplay); Duane Jones, Marlene Clark, Bill Gunn, Mabel King, Sam Waymon, Candece Tarpley	
A P R I L	23	Messiah of Evil	International Cine Film Corp. / V/M Productions	Willard Huyck, Gloria Katz (directors/screenplay); Michael Greer, Marianna Hill, Joy Bang, Anitra Ford, Royal Dano, Elisha Cook Jr., Charles Dierkop, Bennie Robinson, Walter Hill	
A P R I L	25	The Swinging Teacher	Montgomery Productions	David Feldshuh (director); Kathy Fehn (screenplay); Michael Montgomery, Lynn Baker, Charley McCarty, Nancy Nelson, John Pike Jr.	
A P R I L	27	And Now the Screaming Starts!	Fox-Rank / Amicus Productions	Roy Ward Baker (director); Roger Marshall (screenplay); Peter Cushing, Herbert Lom, Patrick Magee, Stephanie Beacham, Ian Ogilvy, Geoffrey Whitehead, Guy Rolfe, Rosalie Crutchley, Gillian Lind, Janet Key, Sally Harrison	
M A Y	1	Guns of a Stranger	Universal Pictures / Marty Robbins Enterprises	Robert Hinkle (director); Charles W. Aldridge (screenplay); Marty Robbins, Chill Wills, Dovie Beams, Bill Coontz, Shug Fisher, Fred Graham, Steven Tackett, Tom Hartman, Charles W. Aldridge, Ronny Robbins, Melody Hinkle, Mark Reed, Don Winters, Bobby Sykes, Phil Strassberg, Al Wood, Harold Wells, Jack Swank, Du Shon, Glenn Bond, Jim Mooney, Jenny Needham, Nudie, Ron Nix	
M A Y	9	Billy Jack (re-release)	Warner Bros. / National Student Film Corporation	T.C. Frank (director); Frank Christina, Theresa Christina (screenplay); Tom Laughlin, Delores Taylor, Clark Howat, Bert Freed, Kenneth Tobey, Howard Hesseman, Cisse Cameron, Han Bong-soo, David Roya, Victor Izay, Julie Webb, Debbie Schock, Teresa Kelly, Lynn Baker, Stan Rice, John McClure, Susan Foster, Susan Sosa	
M A Y	9	Father, Dear Father	J. Arthur Rank Film Distributors / Sedgemoor Film Productions / M.M. Film Productions	William G. Stewart (director); Brian Cooke, Johnnie Mortimer (screenplay); Patrick Cargill, Natasha Pyne, Ann Holloway, Noel Dyson, Joyce Carey, Richard O'Sullivan, Ursula Howells, Jack Watling, Donald Sinden, Jill Melford, Beryl Reid, Joseph O'Conor, Elizabeth Adare, Clifton Jones	
M A Y	9	Hitler: The Last Ten Days	Paramount Pictures / Tomorrow Entertainment / West Film	Ennio De Concini (director/screenplay); Gerhard Boldt, Maria Pia Fusco, Ivan Moffat, Wolfgang Reinhardt (screenplay); Alec Guinness, Simon Ward, Adolfo Celi, Diane Cilento, Gabriele Ferzetti, Eric Porter, Doris Kunstmann, Joss Ackland, John Bennett, John Barron, Barbara Jefford, Valerie Gray, Ann Lynn, Sheila Gish, Julian Glover, Michael Goodliffe, Mark Kingston, Timothy West, Andrew Sachs, Philip Stone	
M A Y	9	Paper Moon	Paramount Pictures / The Directors Company	Peter Bogdanovich (director); Alvin Sargent (screenplay); Ryan O'Neal, Tatum O'Neal, Madeline Kahn, John Hillerman, Burton Gilliam, James N. Harrell, Noble Willingham, Randy Quaid, Hugh Gillin, Art Ellison, Jack Benny, Jim Jordan, Marian Jordan, P.J. Johnson, Rose-Mary Rumbley	
M A Y	11	The Harrad Experiment	Cinerama Releasing Corporation	Ted Post (director); Michael Werner, Ted Cassidy (screenplay); James Whitmore, Tippi Hedren, Don Johnson, Bruno Kirby, Laurie Walters, Robert Middleton, Billy Sands, Eric Server, Ted Cassidy, Gregory Harrison, Melody Patterson, George Memmoli, Bill Saluga, Fred Willard, Melanie Griffith, Victoria Thompson, Elliott Street, Sharon Ullrick, Maggie Wellman, Ron Kolman	
M A Y	11	Little Laura and Big John	Crown International / Louis Wiethe Productions	Luke Moberly, Bob Woodburn (directors/screenplay); Fabian Forte, Karen Black, Ross Kananga, Paul Gleason, Ray Barrett, Ivy Thayer, Ken Miller, Cliff Frates, Jerry Rhodes	
M A Y	15	Jeremy	United Artists / Kenesset Film Productions	Arthur Barron (director/screenplay); Robby Benson, Glynnis O'Connor, Leonardo Cimino, Ted Sorel, Eunice Anderson, Dennis Boutsikaris, Len Bari, Ned Wilson, Chris Bohn, Pat Wheel, Bruce Friedman	
M A Y	16	The Day of the Jackal	Universal Pictures / Warwick Film Productions / Universal Productions France	Fred Zinnemann (director); Kenneth Ross (screenplay); Edward Fox, Michel Lonsdale, Terence Alexander, Michel Auclair, Alan Badel, Tony Britton, Derek Jacobi, Denis Carey, Cyril Cusack, Maurice Denham, Delphine Seyrig, Jacques François, Olga Georges-Picot, Raymond Gérôme, Barrie Ingham, Jean Martin, Ronald Pickup, Vernon Dobtcheff, Eric Porter, Anton Rodgers, Donald Sinden, Jean Sorel, David Swift, Timothy West, Bernard Archard, Philippe Léotard, Adrien Cayla-Legrand, Edward Hardwicke, Howard Vernon, David Kernan, Féodor Atkine, Max Faulkner, Liliane Rovère	
M A Y	20	The Hireling	Columbia Pictures	Alan Bridges (director); Wolf Mankowitz (screenplay); Robert Shaw, Sarah Miles, Peter Egan, Caroline Mortimer, Elizabeth Sellars, Ian Hogg, Christine Hargreaves, Lyndon Brook, Patricia Lawrence, Petra Markham	
M A Y	20	Pat Garrett and Billy the Kid	Metro-Goldwyn-Mayer	Sam Peckinpah (director); Rudy Wurlitzer (screenplay); James Coburn, Kris Kristofferson, Bob Dylan, Jason Robards, Richard Jaeckel, Rita Coolidge, Chill Wills, Barry Sullivan, R.G. Armstrong, Luke Askew, John Beck, Richard Bright, Matt Clark, Jack Dodson, Jack Elam, Emilio Fernández, Paul Fix, L.Q. Jones, Slim Pickens, Jorge Russek, Charles Martin Smith, Katy Jurado, Harry Dean Stanton, Claudia Bryar, John Davis Chandler, Michael T. Mikler, Aurora Clavel, Rutanya Alda, Walter Kelley, Rudy Wurlitzer, Elisha Cook Jr., Gene Evans, Donnie Fritts, Dub Taylor, Don Levy, Sam Peckinpah, Bruce Dern	
M A Y	20	Terror in the Wax Museum	Cinerama Releasing Corporation / Andrew J. Fenady Productions / Bing Crosby Productions	Georg Fenady (director); Andrew J. Fenady (screenplay); Ray Milland, Elsa Lanchester, Maurice Evans, John Carradine, Broderick Crawford, Louis Hayward, Patric Knowles, Shani Wallis, Mark Edwards, Lisa Lu, Ben Wright, Peggy Stewart, Sandy Helberg, Steven Marlo, Nicole Shelby, Mathilda Calnan, Leslie Thompson, Don Herbert, Judy Wetmore, Jo Williamson, George Farina, Diane Wahrman, Rosa Huerta, Ben Brown, Rickie Weir, Paul Wilson, Ralph Cunningham, Don Williamson, Evelyn Reynolds	
M A Y	22	A Doll's House	Paramount Pictures	Patrick Garland (director); Christopher Hampton (screenplay); Claire Bloom, Anthony Hopkins, Ralph Richardson, Denholm Elliott, Edith Evans, Anna Massey, Helen Blatch, Kimberley Hampton, Mark Summerfield, Stefanie Summerfield	
M A Y	24	Day for Night	Warner-Columbia Film / Les Films du Carrosse / PECF / PIC	François Truffaut (director/screenplay); Jean-Louis Richard, Suzanne Schiffman (screenplay); Jacqueline Bisset, Valentina Cortese, Dani, Alexandra Stewart, Jean-Pierre Aumont, Jean Champion, Jean-Pierre Léaud, François Truffaut, Niké Arrighi, Nathalie Baye, David Markham, Bernard Ménez, Zénaïde Rossi, Xavier Saint-Macary, Claude Miller, Gaston Joly, Jean Panisse	
M A Y	24	Emperor of the North Pole	20th Century Fox / Inter-Hemisphere	Robert Aldrich (director); Christopher Knopf (screenplay); Lee Marvin, Ernest Borgnine, Keith Carradine, Charles Tyner, Malcolm Atterbury, Harry Caesar, Elisha Cook Jr., Liam Dunn, Simon Oakland, Matt Clark, Vic Tayback, Hal Baylor, Robert Foulk, James Goodwin, Raymond Guth, Sid Haig, Karl Lukas, John Steadman, Dave Willock, Lance Henriksen	
J U N E	6	The Blockhouse	Metro-Goldwyn-Mayer / Cannon Films	Clive Rees (director/screenplay); John Gould (screenplay); Peter Sellers, Charles Aznavour, Jeremy Kemp, Per Oscarsson, Peter Vaughan, Nicholas Jones, Leon Lissek, Alfred Lynch	
J U N E	6	Little Cigars	American International Pictures	Chris Christenberry (director); Louis Garfinkle, Frank Ray Perilli (screenplay); Angel Tompkins, Billy Curtis, Jerry Maren, Frank Delfino, Felix Silla, Emory Souza, Joe De Santis, Jon Cedar, Philip Kenneally, Barbara Rhoades, Todd Susman, Michael Pataki	
J U N E	8	Cannibal Girls	American International Pictures	Ivan Reitman (director); Daniel Goldberg (screenplay); Eugene Levy, Andrea Martin, Alan Gordon, Earl Pomerantz, Fishka Rais, Ronald Ulrich, Randall Carpenter, Bonnie Neilson, Mira Pawluk, Bob McHeady, Allan Price, May Jarvis, Gino Marrocco, Rick Maguire, Bunker, Marion Swadron	
J U N E	13	Wicked, Wicked	Metro-Goldwyn-Mayer	Richard L. Bare (director/screenplay); David Bailey, Tiffany Bolling, Randolph Roberts, Scott Brady, Edd Byrnes, Madeleine Sherwood, Arthur O'Connell, Indira Danks	
J U N E	14	The Last of Sheila	Warner Bros. / Hera Productions	Herbert Ross (director); Anthony Perkins, Stephen Sondheim (screenplay); Richard Benjamin, Dyan Cannon, James Coburn, Joan Hackett, James Mason, Ian McShane, Raquel Welch, Yvonne Romain	
J U N E	15	Battle for the Planet of the Apes	20th Century Fox / APJAC Productions	J. Lee Thompson (director); John William Corrington, Joyce Hooper Corrington (screenplay); Roddy McDowall, Claude Akins, Natalie Trundy, Severn Darden, Lew Ayres, Paul Williams, John Huston, Austin Stoker, Noah Keen, Richard Eastham, France Nuyen, Paul Stevens, John Landis, Heather Lowe, Bobby Porter, Michael Stearns, Cal Wilson, Pat Cardi	
J U N E	15	Idaho Transfer	Cinemation Industries / Pando Company	Peter Fonda (director); Thomas Matthiesen (screenplay); Keith Carradine, Kelley Bohanon, Kevin Hearst, Caroline Hildebrand, Ted D'Arms, Judy Motulsky, Dale Hopkins, Fred Seagraves, Joe Newman, Susan Kelly, Meridith Hull, Roy B. Ayers, Kim Casper, Debbie Scott, Devin Burke, Earl Crabb	
J U N E	15	Interval	AVCO Embassy Pictures / Euro-American Films	Daniel Mann (director); Gavin Lambert (screenplay); Merle Oberon, Robert Wolders, Claudio Brook, Ross Conway, Britt Leach, Peter von Zerneck	
J U N E	15	The Legend of Hell House	20th Century Fox / Academy Pictures Corporation	John Hough (director); Richard Matheson (screenplay); Pamela Franklin, Roddy McDowall, Clive Revill, Gayle Hunnicutt, Roland Culver, Peter Bowles, Michael Gough	
J U N E	16	Coffy	American International Pictures	Jack Hill (director/screenplay); Pam Grier, Booker Bradshaw, Robert DoQui, William Elliott, Allan Arbus, Sid Haig, Barry Cahill, Lee de Broux, Carol Locatell, Linda Haynes, Bob Minor, Ruben Moreno, Lisa Farringer, John Perak, Mwako Cumbuka, Morris Buchanan	
J U N E	17	Blume in Love	Warner Bros.	Paul Mazursky (director/screenplay); George Segal, Susan Anspach, Kris Kristofferson, Marsha Mason, Shelley Winters, Paul Mazursky, Annazette Chase, Shelley Morrison, Mary Jackson, Ed Peck, Judyann Elder, Karl Lukas, Rutanya Alda, Jane Jenkins, Sally Kirkland, Albert Popwell, Donald F. Muhich, Erin O'Reilly, Carol Worthington	
J U N E	20	O Lucky Man!	Warner Bros.	Lindsay Anderson (director); David Sherwin (screenplay); Malcolm McDowell, Ralph Richardson, Rachel Roberts, Arthur Lowe, Helen Mirren, Graham Crowden, Dandy Nichols, Peter Jeffrey, Mona Washbourne, Philip Stone, Mary MacLeod, Wallas Eaton, Warren Clarke, Bill Owen, Michael Medwin, Vivian Pickles, Geoffrey Palmer, Christine Noonan, Geoffrey Chater, Anthony Nicholls, James Bolam, Brian Glover, Brian Pettifer, Edward Judd, Alan Price, Jeremy Bulloch, Ben Aris, Margot Bennett, Anna Dawson, Lindsay Anderson	
J U N E	20	One Little Indian	Walt Disney Productions / Buena Vista Distribution	Bernard McEveety (director); Harry Spalding (screenplay); James Garner, Vera Miles, Pat Hingle, John Doucette, Morgan Woodward, Andrew Prine, Robert Pine, Bruce Glover, Ken Swofford, Jay Silverheels, Jodie Foster, Walter Brooke, Hal Baylor, Terry Wilson, Paul Sorensen, Read Morgan, Richard Hale, Jim Davis, Clay O'Brien, Rudy Diaz, John C. Flinn III, Lois Red Elk	
J U N E	20	Shaft in Africa	Metro-Goldwyn-Mayer	John Guillermin (director); Stirling Silliphant (screenplay); Richard Roundtree, Frank Finlay, Vonetta McGee, Neda Arnerić, Marne Maitland, Spiros Focás, Jacques Herlin, Frank McRae, Nadim Sawalha, Thomas Baptiste, Glynn Edwards, Cy Grant, Jacques Marin, Aldo Sambrell, James E. Myers, Debebe Eshetu, Jho Jhenkins, Willie Jonah, Adolfo Lastretti, Zenebech Tadesse, A.V. Falana, Jon Chevron, Nik Zaran	
J U N E	20	Showdown	Universal Pictures	George Seaton (director); Theodore Taylor (screenplay); Rock Hudson, Dean Martin, Susan Clark, Donald Moffat, John McLiam, Vic Mohica, Ed Begley Jr., Charles Baca, Jackson Kane, Ben Zeller, John Richard Gill, Philip L. Mead, Rita Rogers, Raleigh Gardenhire, Dan Boydston	
J U N E	20	A Touch of Class	AVCO Embassy Pictures / Brut Productions	Melvin Frank (director/screenplay); Jack Rose (screenplay); George Segal, Glenda Jackson, Paul Sorvino, Hildegarde Neil, K Callan, Cec Linder, Lisa Vanderpump, Michael Elwyn, Mary Barclay, Nadim Sawalha, Eve Karpf, David de Keyser, Timothy Carlton, Stuart Damon, David Healy, Donald Hewlett, John Sterland, Ian Thompson, Gaye Brown, Samantha Weysom	
J U N E	26	The Friends of Eddie Coyle	Paramount Pictures	Peter Yates (director); Paul Monash (screenplay); Robert Mitchum, Peter Boyle, Richard Jordan, Steven Keats, Alex Rocco, Joe Santos, Mitchell Ryan, Helena Carroll, Jack Kehoe, Margaret Ladd, James Tolkan, Kevin O'Morrison, Matthew Cowles, Peter MacLean, Marvin Lichterman, Carolyn Pickman	
J U N E	26	Live and Let Die	United Artists / Eon Productions	Guy Hamilton (director); Tom Mankiewicz (screenplay); Roger Moore, Yaphet Kotto, Jane Seymour, Clifton James, Julius W. Harris, Geoffrey Holder, David Hedison, Gloria Hendry, Bernard Lee, Lois Maxwell, Earl Jolly Brown, Roy Stewart, Lon Satton, Joie Chitwood, Madeline Smith, Kubi Chaza, B. J. Arnau, Tommy Lane, Arnold Williams, Ruth Kempf, Michael Ebbin	
J U N E	28	40 Carats	Columbia Pictures / Frankovich Productions	Milton Katselas (director); Leonard Gershe (screenplay); Liv Ullmann, Edward Albert, Gene Kelly, Binnie Barnes, Deborah Raffin, Billy Green Bush, Nancy Walker, Don Porter, Rosemary Murphy, Natalie Schafer, Claudia Jennings, Sam Chew Jr.	
J U N E	28	The Man Who Loved Cat Dancing	Metro-Goldwyn-Mayer	Richard C. Sarafian (director); Eleanor Perry (screenplay); Burt Reynolds, Sarah Miles, Lee J. Cobb, Jack Warden, George Hamilton, Bo Hopkins, Robert Donner, Jay Silverheels, Jay Varela, James Hampton	
J U N E	30	Belladonna of Sadness	Nippon Herald Films / Mushi Production	Eiichi Yamamoto (director/screenplay); Yoshiyuki Fukuda (screenplay); Tatsuya Nakadai, Masakane Yonekura, Aiko Nagayama, Katsutaka Ito, Masaya Takahashi, Shigako Shimegi, Chinatsu Nakayama	

== July–September ==
Opening		Title	Production company	Cast and crew	Ref.
J U L Y	2	Oklahoma Crude	Columbia Pictures / Stanley Kramer Productions	Stanley Kramer (director); Marc Norman (screenplay); George C. Scott, Faye Dunaway, John Mills, Jack Palance, William Lucking, Harvey Jason, Ted Gehring, Cliff Osmond, Rafael Campos, Woodrow Parfrey, Harvey Parry, Hal Smith, James Jeter, Larry D. Mann, John Dierkes, Karl Lukas, Billy Varga, John Hudkins, Bob Herron, Jerry Brown, Jim Burk, Henry Wills, Cody Bearpaw, Wayne Storm	
J U L Y	11	Cahill U.S. Marshal	Warner Bros. / Batjac Productions	Andrew V. McLaglen (director); Harry Julian Fink, Rita M. Fink (screenplay); John Wayne, George Kennedy, Gary Grimes, Neville Brand, Marie Windsor, Morgan Paull, Dan Vadis, Royal Dano, Denver Pyle, Jackie Coogan, Rayford Barnes, Harry Carey Jr., Walter Barnes, Paul Fix, Pepper Martin, Hank Worden, James Nusser, Hunter von Leer, Clay O'Brien, Scott Walker, Dan Kemp, Murray MacLeod	
J U L Y	12	Blue Blood	Impact Quadrant Films / Mallard Productions	Andrew Sinclair (director/screenplay); Oliver Reed, Fiona Lewis, Derek Jacobi, Anna Gaël, Meg Wynn Owen, Richard Davies, Elaine Ives-Cameron, Tim Wylton, Hubert Rees, Dilys Price, John Rainer, Gwyneth Owen, Patrick Carter, Andrew McCall, Sally Anne Newton, Timon Sinclair	
J U L Y	13	Cleopatra Jones	Warner Bros.	Jack Starrett (director); Max Julien, Sheldon Keller (screenplay); Tamara Dobson, Bernie Casey, Shelley Winters, Antonio Fargas, Brenda Sykes, Bill McKinney, Dan Frazer, Stafford Morgan, Mike Warren, Albert Popwell, Caro Kenyatta, Esther Rolle, Don Cornelius, Frankie Crocker, Eugene W. Jackson III, Lee Weaver	
J U L Y	13	Lady Ice	National General Pictures / Tomorrow Entertainment	Tom Gries (director); Harold Clemens, Alan Trustman (screenplay); Donald Sutherland, Jennifer O'Neill, Robert Duvall, Patrick Magee, Jon Cypher, Eric Braeden, Buffy Dee, Perry Lopez, Zvee Scooler, Dana Elcar	
J U L Y	16	Ana and the Wolves		Carlos Saura (director/screenplay); Rafael Azcona (screenplay); Geraldine Chaplin, Fernando Fernán Gómez, José María Prada, José Vivó, Rafaela Aparicio, Charo Soriano, Marisa Porcel, Nuria Lage, María José Puerta, Sara Gil	
J U L Y	18	Sssssss	Universal Pictures / The Zanuck/Brown Company	Bernard L. Kowalski (director); Hal Dresner, Daniel C. Striepeke (screenplay); Strother Martin, Dirk Benedict, Heather Menzies, Richard B. Shull, Tim O'Connor, Jack Ging, Reb Brown, Charles Seel, Noble Craig, Kathleen King, Ted Grossman, Ray Ballard	
J U L Y	20	Dillinger	American International Pictures / F.P. Productions	John Milius (director/screenplay); Warren Oates, Ben Johnson, Cloris Leachman, Michelle Phillips, Harry Dean Stanton, John Ryan, Richard Dreyfuss, Geoffrey Lewis, Steve Kanaly, John Martino, Roy Jenson, Read Morgan, Frank McRae	
J U L Y	25	Badge 373	Paramount Pictures	Howard W. Koch (director); Pete Hamill (screenplay); Robert Duvall, Verna Bloom, Henry Darrow, Eddie Egan, Felipe Luciano, Luis Avalos, Rose Ann Scamardella, Pete Hamill, Tracey Walter, Ric Mancini, Johnny Pacheco, Orestes Matacena, Jimmy Walker, Tina Cristiani, Marina Durell, Chico Martinez, Jose Duval, Louis Cosentino, Nubia Olivero, Sam Schacht, Edward F. Carey, "Big" Lee, Duane Morris, John Marriott, Joe Veiga, Mark Tendler, Robert Weil, Larry Appelbaum, Bob Farley, John Scanlon, Jimmy Archer, Mike O'Dowd, Robert Miano, Pompie Pomposello, Hector Troy, Miguel Alejandro, Harry Collazo, Damian Colon	
J U L Y	25	The Mackintosh Man	Warner Bros. / Newman-Foreman Company	John Huston (director); Walter Hill, William Fairchild (screenplay); Paul Newman, Dominique Sanda, James Mason, Harry Andrews, Ian Bannen, Michael Hordern, Nigel Patrick, Peter Vaughan, Roland Culver, Percy Herbert, Robert Lang, Leo Genn, Jenny Runacre, John Bindon, Hugh Manning, Wolfe Morris, Noel Purcell, Niall MacGinnis, Eddie Byrne, Shane Briant, Eric Mason, Nosher Powell, Donal McCann, Joe Lynch, Tom Irwin, Donald Webster, Keith Bell, Michael Poole, Dinny Powell, Douglas Robinson, Marcelle Castillo	
J U L Y	25	No Sex Please, We're British	Columbia Pictures	Cliff Owen (director); Brian Cooke, Johnnie Mortimer (screenplay); Ronnie Corbett, Ian Ogilvy, Susan Penhaligon, Beryl Reid, Arthur Lowe, Michael Bates, Cheryl Hall, David Swift, Deryck Guyler, Valerie Leon, Margaret Nolan, Gerald Sim, John Bindon, Stephen Greif, Michael Robbins, Frank Thornton, Michael Ripper, Lloyd Lamble, Mavis Villiers, Sydney Bromley, Brian Wilde, Eric Longworth, Edward Sinclair, Fred Griffiths, Lucy Griffiths, Robin Askwith	
J U L Y	27	The Last American Hero	20th Century Fox	Lamont Johnson (director); William Roberts, William Kerby (screenplay); Jeff Bridges, Valerie Perrine, Geraldine Fitzgerald, Ned Beatty, Gary Busey, Art Lund, Ed Lauter, William Smith II, Gregory Walcott, Tom Ligon, Lane Smith, Ernie Orsatti Jr., Erica Hagen, James Murphy	
A U G U S T	1	The Boy Who Cried Werewolf	Universal Pictures / RKF	Nathan H. Juran (director); Bob Homel (screenplay); Kerwin Mathews, Elaine Devry, Robert J. Wilke, George Gaynes, David S. Cass Sr., Harold Goodwin, Paul Baxley, Scott Sealey, Susan Foster, Jack Lucas, Bob Homel, Loretta Temple	
A U G U S T	1	Maurie	National General Pictures / Ausable Films	Daniel Mann (director); Douglas Morrow (screenplay); Bernie Casey, Bo Svenson, Bill Walker, Maidie Norman, Ji-Tu Cumbuka, Janet MacLachlan	
A U G U S T	1	The Naked Ape	Universal Pictures / Playboy Enterprises	Donald Driver (director/screenplay); Johnny Crawford, Victoria Principal, Dennis Olivieri, Diana Darrin, Norman Grabowski, John Hillerman, Helen Horowitz, Robert Ito, Marvin Miller	
A U G U S T	3	Blackenstein	Prestige Pictures / Frisco Productions Limited	William A. Levey (director); Frank R. Saletri (screenplay); John Hart, Andrea King, Liz Renay, Don Brodie, Ivory Stone, Joe De Sue, Roosevelt Jackson, Nick Bolin, Karin Lind, Yvonne Robinson	
A U G U S T	3	The Neptune Factor	20th Century Fox	Daniel Petrie (director); Jack DeWitt (screenplay); Ben Gazzara, Yvette Mimieux, Walter Pidgeon, Ernest Borgnine, Donnelly Rhodes, Chris Wiggins, Michael J. Reynolds, Leslie Carlson, Stuart Gillard, David Yorston	
A U G U S T	8	Heavy Traffic	American International Pictures / Steve Krantz Productions	Ralph Bakshi (director/screenplay); Joseph Kaufmann, Beverly Hope Atkinson, Frank de Kova, Terri Haven, Mary Dean Lauria, Charles Gordone, Jim Bates, Jacqueline Mills, Lillian Adams, Peter Hobbs, Candy Candido	
A U G U S T	8	The Stone Killer	Columbia Pictures / De Laurentiis International Manufacturing / Company S.p.A.	Michael Winner (director); Gerald Wilson (screenplay); Charles Bronson, Martin Balsam, David Sheiner, Norman Fell, Ralph Waite, Paul Koslo, Stuart Margolin, Jack Colvin, John Ritter	
A U G U S T	8	White Lightning	United Artists	Joseph Sargent (director); William W. Norton (screenplay); Burt Reynolds, Jennifer Billingsley, Ned Beatty, Bo Hopkins, Matt Clark, Louise Latham, Diane Ladd, R.G. Armstrong, Conlan Carter, Dabbs Greer, John Steadman, Laura Dern, Lincoln Demyan, Iris Korn, Stephanie Burchfield, Barbara Muller	
A U G U S T	9	Gordon's War	20th Century Fox / Palomar Pictures	Ossie Davis (director); Howard Friedlander, Ed Spielman (screenplay); Paul Winfield, Carl Lee, David Downing, Tony King, Gilbert Lewis, Carl Gordon, Nathan Heard, Grace Jones, Adam Wade, Hansford Rowe, Ralph Wilcox, Jackie Page, Chuck Bergansky, Warren Taurien, David Connell, Rochelle LeNoir, Charles McGregor	
A U G U S T	10	Night Watch	AVCO Embassy Pictures / Brut Productions / Nightwatch Films	Brian G. Hutton (director); Tony Williamson, Evan Jones (screenplay); Elizabeth Taylor, Laurence Harvey, Billie Whitelaw, Robert Lang, Tony Britton, Bill Dean, Pauline Jameson, Linda Hayden, Kevin Colson, David Jackson, Michael Danvers-Walker, Rosario Serrano, Laon Maybanke	
A U G U S T	11	American Graffiti	Universal Pictures / Lucasfilm Ltd. / The Coppola Company	George Lucas (director/screenplay); Gloria Katz, Willard Huyck (screenplay); Richard Dreyfuss, Ron Howard, Paul Le Mat, Charles Martin Smith, Candy Clark, Mackenzie Phillips, Cindy Williams, Wolfman Jack, Bo Hopkins, Manuel Padilla Jr., Harrison Ford, Lynne Marie Stewart, Terry McGovern, Kathleen Quinlan, Scott Beach, Jana Bellan, Susan Richardson, Kay Ann Kemper, Joe Spano, Debralee Scott, Suzanne Somers	
A U G U S T	15	Cops and Robbers	United Artists	Aram Avakian (director); Donald E. Westlake (screenplay); Cliff Gorman, Joseph Bologna, Delphi Lawrence, Charlene Dallas, John P. Ryan, Dolph Sweet, Joe Spinell, Shepperd Strudwick, Frances Foster, Walt Gorney, Ellen Holly, Randy Jurgensen, Albert Henderson, Gayle Gorman, George Harris II, James Ferguson	
A U G U S T	15	Jesus Christ Superstar	Universal Pictures	Norman Jewison (director/screenplay); Melvyn Bragg (screenplay); Ted Neeley, Carl Anderson, Yvonne Elliman, Barry Dennen, Bob Bingham, Larry Marshall, Josh Mostel, Kurt Yaghjian, Philip Toubus	
A U G U S T	17	Happy Mother's Day, Love George	Cinema 5 Distributing	Darren McGavin (director); Robert Clouse (screenplay); Patricia Neal, Cloris Leachman, Bobby Darin, Tessa Dahl, Ron Howard, Kathie Browne, Joe Mascolo, Simon Oakland, Thayer David	
A U G U S T	17	Romeo and Juliet (re-release)	Paramount Pictures / BHE Films / Verona Produzione / Dino de Laurentiis Cinematografica	Franco Zeffirelli (director/screenplay); Franco Brusati, Masolino D'Amico (screenplay); Leonard Whiting, Olivia Hussey, Milo O'Shea, Michael York, John McEnery, Natasha Parry, Pat Heywood, Robert Stephens, Antonio Pierfederici, Esmeralda Ruspoli, Bruce Robinson, Keith Skinner, Roberto Antonelli, Paul Hardwick, Dyson Lovell, Richard Warwick, Roy Holder, Roberto Bisacco, Paola Tedesco, Bruno Filippini, Laurence Olivier	
A U G U S T	17	Westworld	Metro-Goldwyn-Mayer	Michael Crichton (director/screenplay); Yul Brynner, Richard Benjamin, James Brolin, Norman Bartold, Alan Oppenheimer, Victoria Shaw, Dick Van Patten, Linda Scott, Steve Franken, Michael Mikler, Terry Wilson, Majel Barrett, Anne Randall, Charles Seel, Wade Crosby, Nora Marlowe, Lindsay Workman, Lauren Gilbert, Davis Roberts, Howard Platt, Richard Roat, Kenneth Washington, Jared Martin, Robert Patten, Kip King, Bobby Bass, Julie Bennett, Barry Cahill, Chuck Hayward, Robert Hogan, Buddy Joe Hooker, Fred Krone, Rod McGaughy, Robert Nichols, Paul Sorensen	
A U G U S T	19	Electra Glide in Blue	United Artists / Guercio-Hitzig	James William Guercio (director); Robert Boris (screenplay); Robert Blake, Billy "Green" Bush, Mitchell Ryan, Jeannine Riley, Elisha Cook, Royal Dano, Hawk Wolinski, Peter Cetera, Terry Kath, Lee Loughnane, Walter Parazaider, Michael Butler, Nick Nolte, Joe Samsil, Jason Clark, Susan Forristal	
A U G U S T	19	Enter the Dragon	Warner Bros. / Concord Production Inc.	Robert Clouse (director); Michael Allin (screenplay); Bruce Lee, John Saxon, Ahna Capri, Bob Wall, Shih Kien, Jim Kelly, Angela Mao Ying, Betty Chung, Geoffrey Weeks, Yang Sze, Peter Archer, Jackie Chan	
A U G U S T	22	High Plains Drifter	Universal Pictures / The Malpaso Company	Clint Eastwood (director); Ernest Tidyman (screenplay); Clint Eastwood, Verna Bloom, Mariana Hill, Billy Curtis, Mitchell Ryan, Jack Ging, Stefan Gierasch, Ted Hartley, Geoffrey Lewis, Dan Vadis, Anthony James, Walter Barnes, Paul Brinegar, Richard Bull, Robert Donner, John Hillerman, John Quade, Buddy Van Horn, William O'Connell, Russ McCubbin, Reid Cruickshank, James Gosa, Scott Walker	
A U G U S T	26	Bang the Drum Slowly	Paramount Pictures / BTDS Partnership / ANJA Films	John Hancock (director); Mark Harris (screenplay); Robert De Niro, Michael Moriarty, Vincent Gardenia, Phil Foster, Heather MacRae, Ann Wedgeworth, Tom Ligon, Danny Aiello, Selma Diamond, Barbara Babcock, Patrick McVey, Marshall Efron	
S E P T E M B E R	11	I Escaped from Devil's Island	United Artists / The Corman Company	William Witney (director); Richard DeLong Adams (screenplay); Jim Brown, Christopher George, James Luisi, Paul Richards, Richard Rust, Jan Merlin, Robert Phillips, Stephen Whittaker, Richard Ely, Bob Harris, Eduardo Rosas López, Jonathan Dodge, Quintín Bulnes, Gabriella Rios, Ana De Sade	
S E P T E M B E R	14	Chino	Intercontinental Releasing Corporation / Produzioni De Laurentiis International Manufacturing Company / Coral Producciones Cinematográficas / Universal Productions France	Duilio Coletti, John Sturges (directors); Clair Huffaker (screenplay); Charles Bronson, Jill Ireland, Marcel Bozzuffi, Vincent Van Patten, Fausto Tozzi, Ettore Manni, Corrado Gaipa, Melissa Chimenti	
S E P T E M B E R	17	The Pyx	Cinerama Releasing Corporation	Harvey Hart (director); Robert Schlitt (screenplay); Karen Black, Christopher Plummer, Donald Pilon, Jean-Louis Roux, Jacques Godin, Robin Gammell, Yvette Brind'amour, Lee Broker, Terry Haig, Louise Rinfret	
S E P T E M B E R	17	Santee	Crown International Pictures / American Video Cinema / Vagabond Productions / Eaves Movie Ranch	Gary Nelson (director); Brand Bell (screenplay); Glenn Ford, Michael Burns, Dana Wynter, Jay Silverheels, Harry Townes, John Larch, Robert Wilke, Robert Donner, John Bailey, X Brands, Chuck Courtney, Lindsay Crosby, John Hart, Russ McCubbin, Boyd Morgan, Taylor Lacher, Caruth C. Byrd, William Ford, Robert Mellard, Brad Merhage, Ben Zeller	
S E P T E M B E R	18	Hit!	Paramount Pictures	Sidney J. Furie (director); Alan Trustman, David M. Wolf (screenplay); Billy Dee Williams, Richard Pryor, Paul Hampton, Gwen Welles, Sid Melton, Norman Burton, Yves Barsacq, Henri Cogan, Pierre Collet, Tina Andrews, Warren J. Kemmerling, Janet Brandt, Zooey Hall, Todd Martin, Jenny Astruc, Jean-Claude Bercq	
S E P T E M B E R	21	The Spook Who Sat by the Door	United Artists	Ivan Dixon (director); Melvin Clay, Sam Greenlee (screenplay); Lawrence Cook, Paula Kelly, J.A. Preston, Joe Mascolo, Janet League, Paul Butler, Don Blakely, David Lemieux, Jack Aaron, Elaine Aiken, Beverly Gill, Bob Hill, Martin Golar	
S E P T E M B E R	23	Harry in Your Pocket	United Artists	Bruce Geller (director); James Buchanan, Ronald Austin (screenplay); James Coburn, Michael Sarrazin, Trish Van Devere, Walter Pidgeon	
S E P T E M B E R	26	The Slams	Metro-Goldwyn-Mayer / Penelope Productions	Jonathan Kaplan (director); Richard DeLong Adams (screenplay); Jim Brown, Judy Pace, Paul Harris, Frank DeKova, Ted Cassidy, Quinn Redeker, Roland Bob Harris, Frenchia Guizon, John Dennis, Jac Emel	
S E P T E M B E R	27	From the Mixed-Up Files of Mrs. Basil E. Frankweiler	Cinema 5	Fielder Cook (director); Blanche Hanalis (screenplay); Ingrid Bergman, Sally Prager, Johnny Doran, George Rose, Georgann Johnson, Richard Mulligan, Madeline Kahn, Donald Symington, Bruce Conover, Mike Hammett, Linda Selman	
S E P T E M B E R	29	Kid Blue	20th Century Fox / Marvin Schwartz Productions	James Frawley (director); Edwin Shrake (screenplay); Dennis Hopper, Warren Oates, Peter Boyle, Ben Johnson, Lee Purcell, Janice Rule, Ralph Waite, Clifton James, Mary Jackson, Claude Ennis Starlett Jr., Warren Finnerty, Richard Rust, Howard Hesseman, M. Emmet Walsh, Mel Stewart, Eddy Donno, José Torvay, Jay Varela, Owen Orr, Bobby Hall	

== October–December ==
Opening		Title	Production company	Cast and crew	Ref.
O C T O B E R	2	Mean Streets	Warner Bros. / Taplin-Perry-Scorsese Productions	Martin Scorsese (director/screenplay); Mardik Martin (screenplay); Harvey Keitel, Robert De Niro, David Proval, Amy Robinson, Victor Argo, Richard Romanus, Cesare Danova, George Memmoli, Harry Northup, Martin Scorsese, David Carradine, Vincent Price, Catherine Scorsese	
O C T O B E R	4	The Final Programme	New World Pictures / Goodtimes Enterprises / Gladiole Films	Robert Fuest (director/screenplay); Jon Finch, Jenny Runacre, Hugh Griffith, Patrick Magee, Sterling Hayden, Ronald Lacey, Harry Andrews, Graham Crowden, George Coulouris, Basil Henson, Derrick O'Connor, Sarah Douglas, Sandy Ratcliff, Julie Ege, Gilles Millinaire, Sandra Dickinson	
O C T O B E R	15	Badlands	Warner Bros.	Terrence Malick (director/screenplay); Martin Sheen, Sissy Spacek, Warren Oates, Ramon Bieri, Alan Vint, John Carter, Bryan Montgomery, Terrence Malick, Charlie Sheen, Emilio Estevez	
O C T O B E R	16	Don't Look Now	Paramount Pictures	Nicolas Roeg (director); Allan Scott, Chris Bryant (screenplay); Julie Christie, Donald Sutherland, Hilary Mason, Clelia Matania, Massimo Serato, Renato Scarpa, Leopoldo Trieste, David Tree, Giorgio Trestini, Ann Rye, Nicholas Salter, Sharon Williams, Bruno Cattaneo, Adelina Poerio	
O C T O B E R	16	The Paper Chase	20th Century Fox	James Bridges (director/screenplay); Timothy Bottoms, Lindsay Wagner, John Houseman, Graham Beckel, James Naughton, Edward Herrmann, Craig Richard Nelson, Lenny Baker, David Clennon, Regina Baff, Blair Brown, Bob Lydiard	
O C T O B E R	16	Scalawag	Paramount Pictures / The Bryna Company	Kirk Douglas (director); Sid Fleischman, Albert Maltz (screenplay); Kirk Douglas, Mark Lester, Neville Brand, George Eastman, Don Stroud, Lesley-Anne Down, Danny DeVito, Mel Blanc, Phil Brown, Stole Arandelovic, Fabijan Sovagovic, Davor Antolic, Shaft Douglas	
O C T O B E R	19	Charley Varrick	Universal Pictures	Don Siegel (director); Dean Riesner, Howard Rodman (screenplay); Walter Matthau, Andy Robinson, Joe Don Baker, John Vernon, Sheree North, Felicia Farr, Norman Fell, Woodrow Parfrey, William Schallert, Jacqueline Scott, Benson Fong, Marjorie Bennett, Tom Tully, Kathleen O'Malley, Albert Popwell, Bob Steele, Don Siegel, Joe Conforte, James Nolan, Charles Matthau, Hope Summers, Monica Lewis, Christina Hart, Craig R. Baxley	
O C T O B E R	19	The House in Nightmare Park	Anglo-EMI	Peter Sykes (director); Clive Exton, Terry Nation (screenplay); Frankie Howerd, Ray Milland, Hugh Burden, Kenneth Griffith, John Bennett, Rosalie Crutchley, Ruth Dunning, Elizabeth MacLennan, Aimée Delamain, Peter Munt	
O C T O B E R	19	The Outfit	Metro-Goldwyn-Mayer	John Flynn (director/screenplay); Robert Duvall, Karen Black, Joe Don Baker, Robert Ryan, Timothy Carey, Richard Jaeckel, Sheree North, Felice Orlandi, Marie Windsor, Jane Greer, Henry Jones, Joanna Cassidy, Tom Reese, Elisha Cook, Bill McKinney, Anita O'Day, Archie Moore, Tony Young, Roland La Starza, Roy Roberts, Emile Meyer, Roy Jenson, Bern Hoffman, John Steadman, Paul Genge, Francis de Sales, Army Archerd, Tony Trabert, Lee de Broux, Jeannine Riley, George Savalas	
O C T O B E R	19	The Way We Were	Columbia Pictures / Rastar	Sydney Pollack (director); Arthur Laurents (screenplay); Barbra Streisand, Robert Redford, Bradford Dillman, Lois Chiles, Patrick O'Neal, Viveca Lindfors, Allyn Ann McLerie, Murray Hamilton, Herb Edelman, Diana Ewing, Sally Kirkland, Marcia Mae Jones, Don Keefer, George Gaynes, Roy Jenson, James Woods, Constance Forslund, Robert Gerringer, Susan Blakely, Susanne Zenor, Marvin Hamlisch	
O C T O B E R	21	Summer Wishes, Winter Dreams	Columbia Pictures / Rastar	Gilbert Cates (director); Stewart Stern (screenplay); Joanne Woodward, Martin Balsam, Sylvia Sidney, Tresa Hughes, Dori Brenner, Nancy Andrews, Minerva Pious, Ron Rickards, Win Forman, Peter Marklin, Sol Frieder, Helen Ludlam, Grant Code, Gaetano Lisi, Lee Jackson	
O C T O B E R	23	Jonathan Livingston Seagull	Paramount Pictures	Hall Bartlett (director/screenplay); James Franciscus, Juliet Mills, Hal Holbrook, Dorothy McGuire, Richard Crenna, Philip Ahn, Kelly Harmon, David Ladd	
O C T O B E R	24	The All-American Boy	Warner Bros.	Charles Eastman (director/screenplay); Jon Voight, Art Metrano, Jeanne Cooper, Bob Hastings, E. J. Peaker, Ned Glass, Anne Archer, Harry Northup, Rosalind Cash, Leigh French, Jaye P. Morgan, Nancie Phillips, Kathy Mahoney, Carole Androsky, Peggy Cowles, Ray Ballard, Ron Burns, Gene Borkan, Jeff Thompson, Mac Chandler, Owen Harian	
O C T O B E R	25	Five on the Black Hand Side	United Artists	Oscar Williams (director); Charlie L. Russell (screenplay); Clarice Taylor, Leonard Jackson, Virginia Capers, Glynn Turman, D'Urville Martin, Dick Anthony Williams, Ja'net Dubois, Carl Franklin, Godfrey Cambridge, Sonny Jim Gaines, Bonnie Banfield	
O C T O B E R	29	The Homecoming	American Film Theatre	Peter Hall (director); Harold Pinter (screenplay); Paul Rogers, Ian Holm, Cyril Cusack, Terence Rigby, Michael Jayston, Vivien Merchant	
O C T O B E R	29	The Iceman Cometh	American Film Theatre	John Frankenheimer (director); Thomas Quinn Curtiss (screenplay); Lee Marvin, Fredric March, Robert Ryan, Jeff Bridges, Bradford Dillman, Sorrell Booke, Hildy Brooks, Juno Dawson, Evans Evans, Martyn Green, Moses Gunn, Clifton James, John McLiam, Stephen Pearlman, Tom Pedi, George Voskovec	
O C T O B E R	29	That'll Be the Day	Anglo-EMI Film Distributors	Claude Whatham (director); Ray Connolly (screenplay); David Essex, Ringo Starr, Rosemary Leach, James Booth, Billy Fury, Rosalind Ayres, Keith Moon, Robert Lindsay, Deborah Watling, Brenda Bruce, Beth Morris, Daphne Oxenford, Kim Braden, Johnny Shannon, Karl Howman, Sue Holderness, Érin Geraghty, Sacha Puttnam, Peter Turner	
N O V E M B E R	1	Ash Wednesday	Paramount Pictures / Sagittarius Productions	Larry Peerce (director); Jean-Claude Tramont (screenplay); Elizabeth Taylor, Henry Fonda, Helmut Berger, Keith Baxter, Maurice Teynac, Margaret Blye, Monique van Vooren, Dina Sassoli, Dino Mele, Kathy Van Lypps, Carlo Puri, Andrea Esterhazy, Jill Pratt, Irina Wassilchikoff, Maximilian Windisch-Graetz, Nadia Stancioff, Rodolfo Lodi, Raymond Vignale, Jose De Vega, Samantha Starr, Elena Tricoli, Sandra Johnson	
N O V E M B E R	1	A Doll's House	Tomorrow Entertainment	Joseph Losey (director); David Mercer (screenplay); Jane Fonda, David Warner, Trevor Howard, Delphine Seyrig, Edward Fox, Anna Wing, Ingrid Natrud, Pierre Oudry, Morten Floor, Tone Floor, Frode Lien, Dagfinn Hertzberg, Ellen Holm	
N O V E M B E R	7	Executive Action	National General Pictures	David Miller (director); Dalton Trumbo (screenplay); Burt Lancaster, Robert Ryan, Will Geer, John Anderson, Paul Carr, Ed Lauter, Walter Brooke, John Brascia, Richard Bull, Sidney Clute, Lee Delano, Lloyd Gough, Rick Hurst, Robert Karnes, James MacColl, Joaquín Martínez, Dick Miller, Hunter von Leer, Sandy Ward, Rutanya Alda, George Aiken, Eugene Carson Blake, Leonid Brezhnev, Earle Cabell, John Connally, Nellie Connally, Patrick Dean, Everett Dirksen, William C. Foster, J. William Fulbright, William Greer, Andrei Gromyko, Clint Hill, Hubert H. Humphrey, Lady Bird Johnson, Lyndon B. Johnson, Roy Kellerman, Ed Kemmer, John F. Kennedy Jr., Caroline Kennedy, Jacqueline Kennedy, John F. Kennedy, Robert F. Kennedy, Nikita Khrushchev, Malcolm Kilduff, Martin Luther King, Jim Leavelle, John Lewis, Robert McNamara, Lee Harvey Oswald, Ike Pappas, David F. Powers, Joachim Prinz, A. Philip Randolph, Sam Rayburn, Walter Reuther, Jack Ruby, Dean Rusk, Leverett Saltonstall, George A. Smathers, Lewis Strauss, Edward Teller, U Thant, Cyrus Vance, Henry M. Wade, Roy Wilkins, Whitney Young, Gilbert Green, Colby Chester, Oscar Oncidi, Paul Sorenson, William Watson	
N O V E M B E R	8	Carry On Girls	The Rank Organisation	Gerald Thomas (director); Talbot Rothwell (screenplay); Sid James, Barbara Windsor, Joan Sims, Kenneth Connor, Bernard Bresslaw, June Whitfield, Peter Butterworth, Jack Douglas, Patsy Rowlands, Jimmy Logan, Margaret Nolan, Valerie Leon, Joan Hickson, David Lodge, Angela Grant, Sally Geeson, Wendy Richard, Arnold Ridley, Robin Askwith, Patricia Franklin, Brian Osborne, Bill Pertwee, Marianne Stone, Brenda Cowling, Pauline Peart, Michael Nightingale, Hugh Futcher, Ron Tarr, Zena Clifton, Laraine Humphrys, Caroline Whitaker, Barbara Wise, Carol Wyler, Mavis Fyson	
N O V E M B E R	8	Robin Hood	Walt Disney Productions / Buena Vista Distribution	Wolfgang Reitherman (director); Larry Clemmons, Ken Anderson, Vance Gerry, Frank Thomas, Eric Cleworth, Julius Svendsen, David Michener (screenplay); Peter Ustinov, Phil Harris, Brian Bedford, Terry-Thomas, Roger Miller, Pat Buttram, George Lindsey, Andy Devine, Monica Evans, Carole Shelley, Ken Curtis, John Fiedler, Barbara Luddy, Candy Candido, J. Pat O'Malley, Don Bluth, Stan Freberg, Hal Smith, Billy Whitaker, Dana Laurita, Dori Whitaker, Richie Sanders	
N O V E M B E R	12	A Delicate Balance	American Film Theatre	Tony Richardson (director); Edward Albee (screenplay); Katharine Hepburn, Paul Scofield, Lee Remick, Kate Reid, Joseph Cotten, Betsy Blair	
N O V E M B E R	14	The Don Is Dead	Universal Pictures	Richard Fleischer (director); Christopher Trumbo, Marvin H. Albert, Michael Butler (screenplay); Anthony Quinn, Frederic Forrest, Robert Forster, Al Lettieri, Angel Tompkins, Charles Cioffi, Barry Russo, Louis Zorich, Ina Balin, Joe Santos, Frank DeKova, Abe Vigoda, Victor Argo, Val Bisoglio, Robert Carricart, Sid Haig, Vic Tayback, Bobby Bass, Dick Crockett, Lee Delano, Nick Dimitri, Bob Hoy, Roland La Starza, Tanya Lemani, George Robotham, Carlos Romero, Ted White	
N O V E M B E R	16	Arnold	Cinerama Releasing Corporation / Fenady Associates / Bing Crosby Productions	Georg Fenady (director); Jameson Brewer, John Fenton Murray (screenplay); Stella Stevens, Roddy McDowall, Elsa Lanchester, Shani Wallis, Farley Granger, Victor Buono, John McGiver, Bernard Fox, Patric Knowles, Jamie Farr, Ben Wright, Murray Matheson, Norman Stuart, Wanda Bailey, Steven Marlo, Leslie Thompson	
N O V E M B E R	18	Breezy	Universal Pictures / The Malpaso Company	Clint Eastwood (director); Jo Heims (screenplay); William Holden, Kay Lenz, Roger C. Carmel, Marj Dusay, Joan Hotchkis, Jamie Smith-Jackson, Norman Bartold, Lynn Borden, Shelley Morrison, Dennis Olivieri, Eugene Peterson, Richard Bull, Don Diamond, Sandy Kenyon, Buck Young, Priscilla Morrill, Clint Eastwood	
N O V E M B E R	18	England Made Me	Cine Globe / Atlantic Productions / Centralni Filmski Studio / Two World Film	Peter Duffell (director/screenplay); Desmond Cory (screenplay); Peter Finch, Michael York, Hildegarde Neil, Joss Ackland, Michael Hordern, Tessa Wyatt, Michael Sheard, Richard Gibson, Lalla Ward, Demeter Bitenc, Vladan Živković, William Baskiville, Vlado Bacic, Mirjana Nikolic	
N O V E M B E R	20	The Affair	ABC / Sony Pictures Television / Spelling-Goldberg Productions	Gilbert Cates (director); Barbara Turner (screenplay); Natalie Wood, Robert Wagner, Bruce Davison, Jamie Smith-Jackson, Pat Harrington Jr., Kent Smith, Paul Ryan, Frances Reid, Mark Roberts, Anna Karen, Victoria Carroll, Anna Aries, Steve Riskas, Brett Ericson, Robert Stull, Paul Pepper, Suzanne Taylor, Keith Walker, Marland Proctor	
N O V E M B E R	21	Hex	20th Century Fox / Max L. Raab Productions	Leo Garen (director/screenplay); Stephen Katz (screenplay); Keith Carradine, Scott Glenn, Hillarie Thompson, Tina Herazo, Gary Busey, Dan Haggerty, Robert Walker, Iggie Wolfington, Mike Combs, Doria Cook, Tom Jones	
N O V E M B E R	27	Fly Me	New World Pictures / Premiere Productions	Cirio Santiago (director); Miller Drake (screenplay); Pat Anderson, Lenore Kasdorf, Richard Young, Naomi Stevens, Richard Miller, Vic Diaz, Lyllah Torena, Ken Metcalfe, Richard Roake	
N O V E M B E R	30	Flesh for Frankenstein	Bryanston Distributing Company / Compagnia Cinematografica Champion	Paul Morrissey (director/screenplay); Joe Dallesandro, Udo Kier, Monique van Vooren, Dalila Di Lazzaro, Nicoletta Elmi, Liù Bosisio, Cristina Gaioni, Arno Juerging, Srdjan Zelenovic, Marco Liofredi	
D E C E M B E R	5	Serpico	Paramount Pictures / Artists Entertainments Complex, Inc. / Produzion De Laurentiis International Manufacturing Company S.P.A.	Sidney Lumet (director); Waldo Salt, Norman Wexler (screenplay); Al Pacino, John Randolph, Jack Kehoe, Biff McGuire, Edward Grover, Tony Roberts, Allan Rich, Albert Henderson, Hank Garrett, Damien Leake, Joseph Bova, Alan North, Woodie King Jr., James Tolkan, Bernard Barrow, Mildred Clinton, Nathan George, Richard Foronjy, Lewis J. Stadlen, M. Emmet Walsh, Ted Beniades, F. Murray Abraham, Val Bisoglio, Sully Boyar, John Brandon, Sam Coppola, Judd Hirsch, Bianca Hunter, Tony Lo Bianco, Kenneth McMillan, Stephen Pearlman, Jaime Sánchez, Tracey Walter, Charles Weldon, Mary Louise Weller, Barbara Eda-Young, Cornelia Sharpe	
D E C E M B E R	6	Digby, the Biggest Dog in the World	Cinerama Releasing Corporation / Walter Shenson Films	Joseph McGrath (director); Charles Isaacs, Michael Pertwee (screenplay); Jim Dale, Angela Douglas, Spike Milligan, John Bluthal, Milo O'Shea, Norman Rossington, Richard Beaumont, Dinsdale Landen, Garfield Morgan, Victor Spinetti, Harry Towb, Kenneth J. Warren, Bob Todd, Molly Urquhart, Frank Thornton, Victor Maddern, Sheila Steafel	
D E C E M B E R	6	Fantastic Planet	New World Pictures / Les Films Armorial / Ceskoslovenský Filmexport	René Laloux (director/screenplay); Roland Topor (screenplay); Cynthia Adler, Mark Gruner, Hal Smith, Barry Bostwick, Olan Soule, Marvin Miller, Janet Waldo, Nora Heflin, Monika Ramirez	
D E C E M B E R	6	Marco	Cinerama Releasing Corporation / Tomorrow Entertainment / Videocraft International	Seymour Robbie (director); Romeo Muller (screenplay); Desi Arnaz Jr., Jack Weston, Zero Mostel, Fred Sadoff, Tetsu Nakamura, Van Christie, Masumi Okada, Romeo Muller, Cie Cie Win, Aimee Eccles, Mafumi Sakamoto, Osamu Okawa, Yuka Kamebuchi, Ikio Sawamura	
D E C E M B E R	6	The Wicker Man	Warner Bros.	Robin Hardy (director); Anthony Shaffer (screenplay); Edward Woodward, Christopher Lee, Britt Ekland, Annie Ross, Lesley Mackie, Diane Cilento, Ingrid Pitt, Lindsay Kemp, Russell Waters, Aubrey Morris, Irene Sunters, Donald Eccles, Walter Carr, Roy Boyd, Peter Brewis, Geraldine Cowper, John Young, Barbara Rafferty, John Sharp, John Hallam, Tony Roper, Rachel Verney, Jennifer Martin, Myra Forsyth, Alison Hughes	
D E C E M B E R	9	Treasure Island	Warner Bros.	Hal Sutherland (director); Ben Starr (screenplay); Richard Dawson, Davy Jones, Dal McKennon, Larry D. Mann, Larry Storch, Jane Webb, Lou Scheimer	
D E C E M B E R	11	The Three Musketeers	20th Century Fox	Richard Lester (director); George MacDonald Fraser (screenplay); Oliver Reed, Raquel Welch, Richard Chamberlain, Michael York, Frank Finlay, Christopher Lee, Geraldine Chaplin, Simon Ward, Faye Dunaway, Charlton Heston, Jean-Pierre Cassel, Spike Milligan, Roy Kinnear, Georges Wilson, Nicole Calfan, Michael Gothard, Sybil Danning, Gitty Djamal, Joss Ackland, Gretchen Franklin, Ángel del Pozo, Francis de Wolff, Richard Briers, Michael Hordern	
D E C E M B E R	12	The Last Detail	Columbia Pictures / Acrobat Productions / Bright-Persky Associates	Hal Ashby (director); Robert Towne (screenplay); Jack Nicholson, Otis Young, Randy Quaid, Clifton James, Carol Kane, Michael Moriarty, Nancy Allen, Gilda Radner, Kathleen Miller, Luana Anders, Patricia Hamilton, Michael Chapman, Jim Henshaw, Derek McGrath, Hal Ashby, Gerald Ayres	
D E C E M B E R	12	Now Where Did the 7th Company Get to?	Gaumont	Robert Lamoureux (director/screenplay); Pierre Mondy, Jean Lefebvre, Aldo Maccione, Robert Lamoureux, Pierre Tornade, Robert Dalban, Jacques Marin, Robert Rollis, Erik Colin, Alain Doutey	
D E C E M B E R	14	My Name is Nobody	Universal Pictures / Rafran Cinematografica / Les Filmes Jacques Leitienne / La Societe Im. Ex. Ci. / La Societe Alcinter / Rialto Film Preben Philpsen	Tonino Valerii (director); Ernesto Gastaldi (screenplay); Terence Hill, Henry Fonda, Jean Martin, R.G. Armstrong, Leo Gordon, Steve Kanaly, Geoffrey Lewis, Piero Lulli, Mario Brega, Benito Stefanelli, Alexander Allerson, Antoine Saint-John, Franco Angrisano, Carla Mancini, Karl Braun, Neil Summers, Marc Mazza, Rainer Peets, Tommy Polgár, Antonio Palombi, Hubert Mittendorf, Emil Feist, Luigi Antonio Guerra, Angelo Novi	
D E C E M B E R	14	Superdad	Walt Disney Productions / Buena Vista Distribution	Vincent McEveety (director); Joseph L. McEveety, Harlan Ware (screenplay); Bob Crane, Barbara Rush, Kurt Russell, Joe Flynn, Kathleen Cody, Joby Baker, Dick Van Patten, Bruno Kirby, Judith Lowry, Ivor Francis, Jonathan Daly, Naomi Stevens, Nicholas Hammond, Jack Manning, Larry Gelman, Stephen Dunne, Leon Belasco, Ed Begley Jr., Michael Rupert	
D E C E M B E R	14	The Seven-Ups	20th Century Fox	Philip D'Antoni (director); Albert Ruben, Alexander Jacobs (screenplay); Roy Scheider, Tony Lo Bianco, Larry Haines, Richard Lynch, Bill Hickman, Victor Arnold, Ken Kercheval, Joe Spinell, Rex Everhart, Frances Chaney, Jerry Leon, Lou Polan, Matt Russo, Robert Burr, David Wilson, Ed Jordan, Mary Multari, Benny Marino, Bill Funaro	
D E C E M B E R	16	Hell Up in Harlem	American International Pictures	Larry Cohen (director/screenplay); Fred Williamson, Julius Harris, Gloria Hendry, Margaret Avery, D'Urville Martin, Tony King, Esther Sutherland, Gerald Gordon, Bobby Ramsen, James Dixon, Charles MacGuire	
D E C E M B E R	16	Papillon	Allied Artists / Les Films Corona / General Production Company	Franklin J. Schaffner (director); Dalton Trumbo, Lorenzo Semple Jr. (screenplay); Steve McQueen, Dustin Hoffman, Victor Jory, Don Gordon, Anthony Zerbe, Robert Deman, Woodrow Parfrey, Bill Mumy, George Coulouris, Ratna Assan, William Smithers, Val Avery, Gregory Sierra, Vic Tayback, Mills Watson, Ron Soble, Barbara Morrison, Don Hanmer, E.J. André, Len Lesser, John Quade, Fred Sadoff, Liam Dunn, Peter Brocco, Richard Farnsworth, Harry Monty, Dalton Trumbo	
D E C E M B E R	17	Sleeper	United Artists	Woody Allen (director/screenplay); Marshall Brickman (screenplay); Woody Allen, Diane Keaton, John Beck, Mary Gregory, Don Keefer, John McLiam, Bartlett Robinson, Chris Forbes, Marya Small, Peter Hobbs, Brian Avery, Spencer Milligan, Stanley Ralph Ross, Regis Cordic, Howard Cosell, George Furth, Seamon Glass, Charles H. Gray, Jerry Hardin, Harry Holcombe, Jackie Mason, Read Morgan, Richard Nixon, Albert Popwell, Douglas Rain, Whitney Rydbeck	
D E C E M B E R	18	Amarcord	New World Pictures	Federico Fellini (director/screenplay); Tonino Guerra (screenplay); Bruno Zanin, Magali Noël, Pupella Maggio, Armando Brancia, Ciccio Ingrassia, Alvaro Vitali, Maria Antonietta Beluzzi, Giuseppe Ianigro, Nando Orfei, Stefano Proietti, Donatella Gambini, Gianfranco Marrocco, Ferdinando De Felice, Bruno Lenzi, Bruno Scagnetti, Francesco Vona, Josiane Tanzilli	
D E C E M B E R	18	Cinderella Liberty	20th Century Fox	Mark Rydell (director); Darryl Ponicsan (screenplay); James Caan, Marsha Mason, Kirk Calloway, Eli Wallach, Burt Young, Dabney Coleman, Bruno Kirby, Allyn Ann McLerie, Allan Arbus, Fred Sadoff, Jon Korkes, Don Calfa, Sally Kirkland, Mark Rydell, David Proval, Christopher Rydell, Jon Locke	
D E C E M B E R	19	The 14	MGM-EMI	David Hemmings (director); Roland Starke (screenplay); Jack Wild, June Brown, Liz Edmiston, Cheryl Hall, Anna Wing, John Bailey, Alun Armstrong, Keith Buckley, Malcolm Tierney, Diana Beevers, Tony Calvin, Chris Kelly, Frank Gentry, Peter Newby, Paul Daly, Richard Haywood	
D E C E M B E R	19	The Day of the Dolphin	AVCO Embassy Pictures	Mike Nichols (director); Buck Henry (screenplay); George C. Scott, Trish Van Devere, Paul Sorvino, Fritz Weaver, Jon Korkes, Edward Herrmann, Leslie Charleson, John David Carson, Victoria Racimo, John Dehner, Severn Darden, William Roerick, Elizabeth Wilson, Phyllis Davis, Florence Stanley, Brooke Hayward, Buck Henry	
D E C E M B E R	19	Willie Dynamite	Universal Pictures / The Zanuck/Brown Company	Gilbert Moses (director); Ron Cutler, Joe Keyes Jr. (screenplay); Roscoe Orman, Diana Sands, Thalmus Rasulala, Norma Donaldson, Roger Robinson, Albert Hall, George Murdock, Royce Wallace, Mary Charlotte Wilcox, Ted Gehring, Wynn Irwin, Nathaniel Taylor, Ken Lynch, Davis Roberts, Tol Avery, Calvin Brown, Robert DoQui, Slim Gaillard, Olan Soule, Clarice Taylor, Alan Weeks, George Wyner, Joyce Walker, Juanita Brown, Judith Brown, Marilyn Coleman, Marcia McBroom, Ron Henriquez	
D E C E M B E R	20	Alvin Purple	Sands Film Company / Hexagon Productions	Tim Burstall (director); Alan Hopgood (screenplay); Graeme Blundell, George Whaley, Jacki Weaver, Penne Hackforth-Jones, Abigail, Noel Ferrier, Jill Forster, Lynette Curran, Christine Amor, Dina Mann, Fred Parslow, Elke Neidhardt, Kris McQuade, Anne Pendlebury, Jon Finlayson, Brian Moll, Peter Cummins, Carole Skinner, Elli Maclure, Dennis Miller, Valerie Blake, Alan Finney, Gary Down, Peter Aanensen, Jenny Hagen, Stan Monroe, Jan Friedl, Barbara Taylor	
D E C E M B E R	20	The Laughing Policeman	20th Century Fox	Stuart Rosenberg (director); Thomas Rickman (screenplay); Walter Matthau, Bruce Dern, Louis Gossett Jr., Anthony Zerbe, Albert Paulsen, Val Avery, Paul Koslo, Cathy Lee Crosby, Mario Gallo, Joanna Cassidy, William Hansen, Louis Guss, Frances Lee McCain, Clifton James, Gregory Sierra, Warren Finnerty, Matt Clark, Leigh French, Anthony Costello, Sacheen Littlefeather	
D E C E M B E R	21	The Deadly Trackers	Warner Bros.	Barry Shear (director); Lukas Heller (screenplay); Richard Harris, Rod Taylor, Al Lettieri, Neville Brand, William Smith, Paul Benjamin, Pedro Armendáriz Jr., Isela Vega, Kelly Jean Peters, William Bryant, Sean Marshall, Read Morgan, Ray Moyer	
D E C E M B E R	21	Jimi Hendrix	Warner Bros.	Joe Boyd, John Head, Gary Weis (directors); Eric Clapton, Billy Cox, Alan Douglas, Germaine Greer, Mick Jagger, Eddie Kramer, Buddy Miles, Mitch Mitchell, Juggy Murray, Little Richard, Lou Reed, Pete Townshend, Jimi Hendrix, Paul Caruso, James A. "Al" Hendrix	
D E C E M B E R	25	The Sting	Universal Pictures / The Zanuck/Brown Company	George Roy Hill (director); David S. Ward (screenplay); Paul Newman, Robert Redford, Robert Shaw, Robert Earl Jones, Charles Durning, Ray Walston, Eileen Brennan, Harold Gould, John Heffernan, Dana Elcar, Jack Kehoe, Dimitra Arliss, James J. Sloyan, Charles Dierkop, Lee Paul, Sally Kirkland, Avon Long, Arch Johnson, Ed Bakey, Brad Sullivan, John Quade, Larry D. Mann, Leonard Barr, Paulene Myers, Joe Tornatore, Jack Collins, Tom Spratley, Kenneth O'Brien, Ken Sansom, Ta-Tanisha, William "Billy" Benedict, Robert Brubaker, Kathleen Freeman, Susan French, Byron Morrow	
D E C E M B E R	25	Magnum Force	Warner Bros. / The Malpaso Company	Ted Post (director); John Milius, Michael Cimino (screenplay); Clint Eastwood, Hal Holbrook, Mitchell Ryan, David Soul, Tim Matheson, Kip Niven, Robert Urich, Felton Perry, Margaret Avery, Bob McClurg, John Mitchum, Albert Popwell, Richard Devon, Christine White, Tony Giorgio, Maurice Argent, Paul D'Amato, Will Hutchins, Terence McGovern, Suzanne Somers, Robert Trebor, Carl Weathers, Johnny Weissmuller Jr., Joseph Whipp, Clifford A. Pellow, Jack Kosslyn, Bob March, Adele Yoshioka	
D E C E M B E R	26	The Exorcist	Warner Bros.	William Friedkin (director); William Peter Blatty (screenplay); Ellen Burstyn, Max von Sydow, Lee J. Cobb, Kitty Winn, Jack MacGowran, Jason Miller, Linda Blair, Father William O'Malley, Father Thomas Bermingham, Peter Masterson, Robert Symonds, Barton Heyman, Rudolf Schündler, Arthur Storch, Titos Vandis, William Peter Blatty, Mercedes McCambridge, Eileen Dietz, Vasiliki Maliaros, Dick Callinan, Gina Petrushka	
D E C E M B E R	29	Tidal Wave (Japan)	Toho	Shiro Moritani (director); Shinobu Hashimoto (screenplay); Keiju Kobayashi, Tetsuro Tamba, Ayumi Ishida, Hiroshi Fujioka, Yusuke Takita, Shōgo Shimada, Andrew Hughes, Nobuo Nakamura, Haruo Nakajima, Hideaki Nitani, Isao Natsuyagi, Akira Nagoya, Sakyo Komatsu	

== See also ==
- List of 1973 box office number-one films in the United States
- 1973 in the United States
