= Wah Do Dem =

2009 American film

- Film poster
- Directed by: Ben Chace; Sam Fleischner
- Written by: Ben Chace; Sam Fleischner
- Produced by: Ben Chace; Sam Fleischner; Katina Faye Hubbard
- Starring: Sean Bones; Norah Jones; Carl Bradshaw
- Cinematography: Sam Fleischner
- Edited by: Ben Chace; Sam Fleischner
- Distributed by: Wah Do Dem LLC
- Release dates: June 20, 2009 (Los Angeles Film Festival); June 2010 (United States)
- Running time: 76 minutes
- Country: United States
- Language: English

Wah Do Dem is a 2009 American independent comedy drama film written, produced, edited, and directed by Ben Chace and Sam Fleischner.

The major roles are played by Kevin Bewersdorf, Sean "Bones" Sullivan (of Brooklyn band Sam Champion), and Carl Bradshaw, who played Jose in the 1972 film The Harder They Come.

== Plot ==
Brooklyn slacker Max wins two tickets for a Caribbean cruise, but ends up travelling alone after being dropped by his girlfriend, Willow. The trip coincides with the 2008 US election, which is won by Barack Obama. After docking in Jamaica, a series of misfortunes sees him travelling across the country where he meets several characters, including musicians and a mystic Rastaman.

== Cast ==
- Sean Bones as Max
- Norah Jones as Willow
- Carl Bradshaw as 'Mystic Man'
- Kevin Bewersdorf as 'the creepy guy on the cruise ship'
- Mark Gibbs as Juvi
- Christopher Palmer (also known by Mr. Lexx/Lexxus, singer/rapper/artist)
- Ira-Wolf Tuton as Ira
- Ben Goldwasser as Ben
- Patrick Morrison
- Sheena Irons
- Suckers as themselves
- The Congos as themselves

== Production ==
The film was directed and written by Ben Chace and Sam Fleischner, and contains a cameo by Norah Jones and a live performance by The Congos.

Wah Do Dem was made after Chace won two cruise tickets in real life and bought more for Bones and Bewersdorf in order to make the film. He arranged for co-producer Katina Faye Hubbard to meet them in Jamaica, where the film was completed. Filming lasted three weeks in total.

The film features music by MGMT, Yeasayer, Santigold, Suckers, Mykal Rose, Mr. Lexx and The Congos. Ira Wolf Tuton of Yeasayer and Ben Goldwasser of MGMT also appear in the film.

== Reception ==
On the review aggregator website Rotten Tomatoes, 72% of 18 critics' reviews are positive, with an average rating of 6.1/10. Metacritic, which uses a weighted average, assigned the film a score of 54 out of 100, based on eight critics, indicating "mixed or average" reviews.

The New York Times called it a "shaggy road movie about relinquishing your comforts to find your bliss", while the New York Post described it as "slight but satisfying". Sheri Linden of The Hollywood Reporter described the film as "a misadventure narrative, told via verite-style guerrilla filmmaking", and called it a "dynamic portrait of Jamaica". Slant magazine gave it three stars out of four, calling it "a brief, peripatetic love letter to Jamaican tropes scrawled on hemp stationary [sic]". Total Film gave it three stars out of five, with Kevin Harley describing it as "stylish, observant, fitfully funny and laced with promise". Rob Nelson, reviewing the film for Variety, described it as "slight but winning and often funny". Derek Malcolm, writing for the London Evening Standard, viewed the film as "impossible not to like".

The Guardian reviewer Peter Bradshaw gave it two stars out of five, calling it "a pretty self-indulgent personal project, sketchily conceived and not particularly well acted". Aaron Hillis of The Village Voice called it a "glorified vacation video". The Boston Globe writer Wesley Morris gave the film one star out of five, opining that the directors "don't open any dramatic or emotional door".

Wah Do Dem won the Jury Award for 'Best Narrative Feature' at the 2009 Los Angeles Film Festival. It has been described as a "mumblecore" film.

== DVD release ==
The film was released on DVD by Factory 25 in October 2010.

== See also ==
- List of American films of 2009
