= Robert Hendrickson =

Robert Hendrickson may refer to:

- Robert Hendrickson (director) (1944–2016), film director
- Robert C. Hendrickson (1898–1964), U.S. Senator from New Jersey
