= Third World Cop =

- Directed by: Chris Browne
- Written by: Chris Browne; Suzanne Fenn; Chris Salewicz
- Produced by: Chris Blackwell
- Starring: Paul Campbell
- Release dates: 6 October 1999 (Jamaica); 24 March 2000 (UK); 21 April 2000 (U.S.)
- Running time: 98 minutes
- Languages: Jamaican Patois; English
- Budget: J$500,000
- Box office: J$21 million

Third World Cop is a 1999 Jamaican action crime film directed by Chris Browne and starring Paul Campbell. It was produced by Chris Blackwell of Island Jamaica Films. It became the highest-grossing Jamaican film.

== Plot ==
After his partner is gunned down by local criminals, undercover policeman Capone (Paul Campbell) is reassigned to crime-infested Kingston, Jamaica. With his new partner Floyd (Winston Bell), Capone is tasked with patrolling the streets of his hometown Dungle. On his first day there, Capone infiltrates an arms trafficking ring with ties to the local Latter Day Saints Church of Christ; a shootout ensues and Capone kills three smugglers. While pursuing several leads, he reunites with his childhood friends, particularly producer Ratty (Mark Danvers) and old flame Rita (Audrey Reid). Unbeknownst to Capone, Ratty is involved in the arms trafficking. Ratty invites Capone to the club, where he is introduced to Ratty's one-handed boss Wonie (Carl Bradshaw) and chances upon a couple of smugglers; he sneaks into their car and discovers that the gang is using several more churches as fronts.

Capone pays Ratty a house visit and inadvertently discovers evidence of his involvement in crime. Initially feigning ignorance, Capone subsequently warns Ratty to be careful. Later on, Capone and Floyd raid a warehouse used by Wonie's gang. Capone fatally shoots a childhood acquaintance who was also in Wonie's employ, but Ratty and the other gang members manage to flee. On the pretext of his possessing cannabis, Wonie is brought into questioning but Capone begrudgingly releases him after he is unable to find any evidence regarding his arms trafficking on his laptop. The police superintendent informs Capone that mercenaries Not Nice (Lenford Salmon) and Deportee (Desmond Ballentine) have also been enlisted to take down the gang, although they will work independently from Capone. Dressed as a drag queen, Capone tracks down Ratty, who has since gone into hiding, and persuades him to testify against Wonie.

Wonie learns of Capone's plan and ambushes Floyd and him while they are on the road with Ratty. Capone takes down Wonie's henchmen, while Floyd apprehends the ringleader. In the midst of the confusion, Ratty, fearful of the repercussions for snitching, burns his testimony. Ratty makes a desperate attempt to shoot Capone but is killed by him instead; a wistful Capone mourns for his onetime friend and solemnly walks away.

== Cast ==
- Paul Campbell as Capone
- Mark Danvers as Ratty
- Carl Bradshaw as Wonie
- Audrey Reid as Rita
- Winston Bell as Floyd
- Lenford Salmon as Not Nice
- Desmond Ballentine (aka Ninjaman) as Deportee

== Music ==
Time described the film's soundtrack as an "engaging mix of reggae and hip-hop-influenced dance hall"; the film features a cover of Junior Marvin's "Police and Thieves" by reggae artist Luciano as well as music by dancehall performers Beenie Man, Innocent Crew, and Lady G, among others. The 13-title soundtrack album was produced by drummer Sly Dunbar and bassist Robert Shakespeare.

== Release ==
Third World Cop ran for twelve weeks in Jamaican cinemas. It was released in the United Kingdom on 28 February 2000 and in the United States on 21 April 2000.

== Reception ==
Third World Cop was a commercial success, breaking the box office records held by Home Alone 2 and Dancehall Queen in Jamaica. It became the highest-grossing Jamaican film ever with J$21 million in the local box office.

A. O. Scott remarked that "true idiom (of Third World Cop) is the universal language of cop-movie cliche". Los Angeles Times reviewer Kenneth Turan described the plot as "old-fashioned" and a "genial case of gangster meets gangsta on the streets of Jamaica", but added that the film offered "an absorbing glimpse into the poorest, most dangerous parts of Kingston". In a review for The Guardian, Peter Bradshaw wrote that the film had "undeniable brio, brashness and style", while also pointing out its "rough-and-ready plot from a familiar template".
