= Audrey Reid =

Audrey Reid may refer to:

- Audrey Reid (high jumper) (born 1952), Jamaican high jumper
- Audrey Reid (actress) (born 1970), Jamaican film actress
