= Carl Bradshaw =

Carl Bradshaw may refer to:

- Carl Bradshaw (actor), Jamaican actor and director
- Carl Bradshaw (footballer) (born 1968), British association footballer
