= Paul Campbell (Jamaican actor) =

Jamaican actor (born 1959)

- Born: 1959 (age 66–67); Colony of Jamaica
- Occupations: Actor, painter

Paul Campbell is a Jamaican actor. He is considered Jamaica's most popular actor and had leading roles in films such as Dancehall Queen, The Lunatic, Third World Cop (as Capone), Shottas (as Mad Max) and Out the Gate. In addition to his roles in most modern Jamaican films, he has also acted on stage in Jamaica and on Broadway in New York City. He is also a painter whose works have been exhibited internationally.

Campbell survived cancer, and released a biopic outlining the journey of his life, including homelessness and stardom. Paul Campbell: The Life and Times of a Jamaican Movie Star highlights aspects of Campbell's life as he develops as a person and an actor, and gives insights into Jamaican life and culture.

He had a minor role in the 2008 US mainstream film First Sunday.
