= Ras Daniel Heartman =

Jamaican artist and religious leader (1942-1990)

- Born: Lloyd George Roberts; 18 January 1942; Kingston, Colony of Jamaica, British Empire
- Died: 1990 (aged 47–48); Arusha, Tanzania
- Children: Ato Kidane Daniel Roberts, Buji Kataiger Roberts (Mani)
- Awards: Institute of Jamaica Centenary Medal for Painters, Sculptors and Designers, 1979

Ras Daniel Heartman (7 January 1942 – 1990), born Lloyd George Roberts, was a Jamaican artist and religious leader. He is considered to be one of the most recognised artists in the Rastafarian art movement, his drawings were widely distributed around the world as prints and he designed a number of well-known reggae album covers in the 1960s and 1970s.

Born in Kingston, Jamaica, he grew up in the tough Whitfield Town area. Heartman featured in the 1972 film The Harder They Come playing the part of Pedro, the best friend of Jimmy Cliff's character Ivan.

Heartman emigrated to Tanzania in East Africa, where he died in Arusha, aged 47.
