= Perry Henzell =

Jamaican filmmaker (1936–2006)

- Born: 7 March 1936; Annotto Bay, St. Mary's, Colony of Jamaica, British Empire
- Died: 30 November 2006 (aged 70); Treasure Beach, St. Elizabeth, Jamaica
- Education: McGill University
- Occupation: Film director
- Notable work: The Harder They Come (1972)
- Spouse: Sally Densham (m. 1965)
- Children: 3

Perry Henzell (7 March 1936 – 30 November 2006) was a Jamaican director. He directed the first Jamaican feature film, The Harder They Come (1972), co-written by Trevor D. Rhone and starring Jimmy Cliff.

== Life and career ==
Henzell, whose ancestors included Huguenot glassblowers and an old English family who had made their fortune growing sugar cane on Antigua, was born in Annotto Bay, Saint Mary Parish, Jamaica, and grew up on the Caymanas sugar-cane estate near Kingston. He was sent to Shrewsbury School in the United Kingdom at the age of 14 and later attended McGill University in Montreal, Canada, in 1953 and 1954. He then dropped out of this school, choosing instead to hitchhike around Europe. He eventually got work as a stagehand for BBC television in London.

Henzell returned in the 1950s to Jamaica, where he directed advertisements for some years until he began work on The Harder They Come with co-writer Trevor D. Rhone. Enormously successful in Jamaica, The Harder They Come also reached the international market and has been described as "possibly the most influential of Jamaican films and one of the most important films from the Caribbean".

In 1965, Henzell married Sally Densham.

Henzell also shot some footage for what was planned as his next film, No Place Like Home, in Harder's aftermath in 1974, but he went broke before he could finish the film. Fed up by this, and the lack of finance for further production, he went on to become a writer, publishing his first novel, Power Game, in 1982. Both were meant to complete a planned trilogy of films centring on Ivanhoe Martin. The footage for No Place Like Home was lost. Years later, he came across editing tapes in a lab in New York. Just to have a sense of completion, he worked on the project. When he showed it to a few friends, their response was enthusiastic. He eventually was able to retrieve the original footage.

A rough cut of No Place Like Home, which features music from Bob Marley, Toots and the Maytals, The Three Degrees, and Marcia Griffiths, was screened for the public at the 31st annual Toronto International Film Festival in September 2006 at the Cumberland Theatre; it was sold out. Film leads Carl Bradshaw (The Harder They Come, Smile Orange, Countryman) and Susan O'Meara attended and answered audience questions with Henzell after the screening. The film was also screened at the Flashpoint Film Festival at the beginning of December 2006 in Negril. (A different film of the same name, a documentary about Hurricane Katrina, was also released in 2006.) A fully restored version was premiered in 2019. The documentary Perry Henzell: A Filmmaker’s Odyssey, directed by David Garonzik and Arthur Gorson, traces the journey to bring No Place Like Home to the big screen.

Henzell had continued to work after being diagnosed in 2000 with cancer. He died from it on 30 November 2006, aged 70.
