= Ulster Spring, Jamaica =

Settlement in Jamaica

Coordinates: 18.317°N 77.518°W

Location of Ulster Spring in Jamaica

Ulster Spring is a settlement in Jamaica, in Cockpit Country. In 2009, its population was recorded as 1,376.

== Notable residents ==
- Michael Thelwell – African-American scholar
