= Ekwueme Michael Thelwell =

Jamaican writer and civil rights activist (born 1939)

- Born: Michael Miles Thelwell; 25 July 1939 (age 87); Ulster Spring, Jamaica
- Education: Jamaica College; Howard University (BA); University of Massachusetts Amherst (MFA)
- Occupations: Writer, professor and civil rights activist
- Notable work: The Harder They Come (1980)

Ekwueme Michael Thelwell (born Michael Miles Thelwell; 25 July 1939) is a Jamaican novelist, essayist, professor and civil rights activist. He was in 1970 founding chairman of the Department of Afro-American Studies at the University of Massachusetts Amherst.

== Early life ==
Born Michael Miles Thelwell in Ulster Spring, Jamaica, he attended Jamaica College and subsequently worked as public relations assistant for the Jamaica Industrial Development Corporation (1958–59). In 1959, he moved to the United States, where he was educated at Howard University (earning a BA, 1964) and at the University of Massachusetts Amherst (MFA, 1969).

== Activism ==
Thelwell was active in the Black Freedom Movement, the Mississippi Freedom Democratic Party (MFDP), and in 1963 he was the Director of the Washington office of the Student Nonviolent Coordinating Committee (SNCC). In the 1980s his anti-apartheid activism resulted in legislation enacting a law against corporate tax write-offs for US-based corporations paying taxes to the apartheid regime in South Africa.

In a 2005 radio interview with Amy Goodman of Democracy Now!, Thelwell said: "I didn't really become black until I set foot in this country (America)."

== Writing ==
Thelwell is widely known for his 1980 novel The Harder They Come, based on the film of the same title about the life and death of real-life Jamaican folk-hero Ivanhoe "Rhyging" Martin. The novel was praised by Nigerian novelist Chinua Achebe (who bestowed on Thelwell the Igbo name Ekwueme, meaning "the man who always does what he says he will") and by literary critic Harold Bloom, who included it in his appendix to The Western Canon.

Thelwell has also published essays, criticism and commentary in The Black Scholar, The New York Times, Village Voice, The Massachusetts Review, Temps Modernes, Partisan Review, Présence Africaine (Paris) and African Commentary. A volume of his short stories and essays, Duties, Pleasures, and Conflicts: Essays in Struggle, was released in 1987. He also helped prepare and edit the political memoirs of black activist Stokely Carmichael, Ready for Revolution: The Life and Struggles of Stokely Carmichael (2003). Thelwell is currently writing a critical study of Chinua Achebe, who dedicated his 1988 collection of essays Hopes and Impediments to Thelwell.

Thelwell has also written two screenplays (Washington Incident, 1972; Girl Beneath the Lion, 1978, with Paul Carter Harrison). He was a senior adviser on the television series Eyes on the Prize (part II; 1990).

== Awards ==
Literary awards Thelwell has received include fellowships from the Rockefeller Foundation, the Society for the Humanities, the National Endowment for the Arts and the Centennial Medal of the Institute of Jamaica.
