= Manson (film) =

1973 documentary film by Laurence Merrick and Robert Hendrickson

- Film poster
- Directed by: Robert Hendrickson; Laurence Merrick
- Written by: Joan Huntington; Laurence Merrick
- Produced by: Robert Hendrickson; Laurence Merrick
- Starring: Charles Manson; The Family
- Narrated by: Jess Pearson
- Cinematography: Jack Beckett; Leo Rivers
- Edited by: Clancy Syrko
- Music by: Brooks Poston; Paul Watkins
- Distributed by: American International Pictures
- Release date: January 1973
- Running time: 83 minutes
- Country: United States
- Language: English

Manson is a 1973 documentary film by Robert Hendrickson and Laurence Merrick about American criminal and cult leader Charles Manson and his followers, known as "The Family". Narrated by Jess Pearson, the film explores the origins of Manson and his disciples, and the lead-up and events of the Tate–LaBianca murders. It was initially distributed by American International Pictures, with re-releases handled by Tobann International Films.

== Content ==
The film deals with the "Manson family" and has many interviews with the members of the group, including Charles Manson, "Squeaky" Fromme, and Sandra Good. It contains original footage of the Manson Family at their Spahn Ranch compound, Devil's Canyon, their Barker Ranch hideout in Death Valley, the Hall of Justice in Los Angeles and various other locations.

== Post release ==
When "Squeaky" Fromme attempted to assassinate President Gerald Ford in 1975, the Manson film was banned by United States district court Judge Thomas McBride in order to preserve Fromme's constitutional right to a fair and speedy trial. Robert Hendrickson's freedom of speech was thus set aside and the matter was taken by the ACLU to the Supreme Court.

Soundtrack music for the film was created by Brooks Poston and Paul Watkins, two former Manson associates. As well, music performed by the Manson Family can also be heard on the soundtrack.

== Accolades ==
It was nominated for an Academy Award for Best Documentary Feature.

== Home video ==
The film was released legitimately on VHS in 1987, but because of an alleged mafia plot Hendrickson spent much of the 1990s suing eBay for allowing bootleg dvd copies of the film to be released. The film has been released and sold in limited copies on DVD signed by Hendrickson on Amazon before his death in 2016.

== Legacy ==
The film has been sampled in popular music, most notably in the opening track 742617000027 from Slipknot’s self-titled 1999 album. The track features the line “The whole thing, I think it’s sick,” taken from the film's interview with Corey Hurst, a former cellmate of Manson family member Susan Atkins.

== See also ==
- List of American films of 1973
- Hippie exploitation films
- Counterculture of the 1960s
