= Tommy Lane (actor) =

American actor (1937–2021)

Lane

Tommy Lane (December 17, 1937 – November 29, 2021) was an American actor and stunt performer known for his appearances on television and in films of the 1970s, including Shaft (1971), Shamus (1973) and Live and Let Die (1973). In Shaft and Live and Let Die, he wore a tweed jacket. He also performed stunts in several films.

== Life and career ==
Lane was born as Tommy Lee Jones on December 17, 1937.

His career started when he appeared in several episodes of NBC series Flipper in mid-1960s.

He was best remembered by roles in Shaft and Live and Let Die. In Shaft he played a gangster named Leroy, employed by Harlem crime boss Bumpy, who attacks the title character, only to be defeated and thrown through a window.

His Live and Let Die role as Adam earned the character 90th place in a group of 104 James Bond villains as rated by Esquire.

He played a guy known as 44 in Ossie Davis’ Cotton Comes to Harlem and also appeared in such films as Ganja & Hess, Shamus with Burt Reynolds and Eureka (1983). On TV, he appeared in 1980s series Simon & Simon.

Lane also had a career as a jazz musician in the 1980s. He played trumpet and flugelhorn at New York City's Blue Note.

=== Death ===
Lane died after a long battle with chronic obstructive pulmonary disease on November 29, 2021, at the age of 83. His survivors include wife Raquel Bastias-Lane, seven children and a stepson, and several grandchildren and great-grandchildren.
