= Audrey Reid (actress) =

Jamaican actress

- Born: 20 September 1970 (age 55); East Kingston, Jamaica
- Occupations: Actress, Producer
- Years active: 1997- Present

Audrey Reid (born 16 January 1970) is a Jamaican film actress and a mother of three children. She is best known for appearing in Dancehall Queen as Marcia and BUPS as Vennette. Audrey has starred in various different Jamaican films such as Third World Cop (1999), Almost Heaven, Obeah Wedding, Higglers, Some Like It Hot, Boy Blue, Irie Neighbour, Con Man, Scandal, Strength of a Woman, It's A Dancehall Ting, and Wicked Bitches.
