= Rhyging =

Jamaican outlaw (1924–1948)

- Rhyging posing with a gun, as reproduced in the Daily Gleaner
- Born: Vincent Martin; 1924; Linstead, St. Catherine, Colony of Jamaica, British Empire
- Died: 9 September 1948 (aged 24); Lime Cay, Colony of Jamaica, British Empire
- Other name: Ivanhoe
- Criminal charges: Wounding, robbery, murder

Vincent "Ivanhoe" Martin (1924–9 September 1948), known as "Rhyging", was a Jamaican criminal who became a legendary outlaw and folk hero, often regarded as the "original rude boy". He became notorious in 1948 after escaping from prison, going on the run and committing a string of robberies, murders and attempted murders before he was gunned down by police. In subsequent decades his life became mythologised in Jamaican popular culture, culminating in the 1972 cult film The Harder They Come, in which he is portrayed by Jimmy Cliff.

His nickname comes from the term rhyging, also spelled rhygin, a variant of "raging". In Jamaican Patois it is used to mean wild, hot, or bad.

== Life ==
=== Early career ===
Born Vincent Martin in Linstead, St. Catherine, Jamaica, he turned to a life of violent crime in his teenage years after moving to Kingston. Short and slim with an "effeminate" voice, he compensated by building a reputation for extreme violence. He was first arrested at 14 for wounding, for which he was sentenced to a birching. Further arrests for wounding and larceny followed, leading to a six-month stint in gaol. After this, he became part of a criminal gang and adopted a variety of pseudonyms, including "Ivanhoe", "Alan Ladd" and "Captain Midnight". In 1946 he was arrested for robbery, beginning his career of self-dramatisation by defending himself in court, irritating the judge with his "long-winded" and grandiose speeches. After a year in gaol, he was released, but quickly committed another robbery, for which he was convicted and sentenced to a five-year term. On 30 April 1948 he escaped from gaol. What followed was a period of several months during which he eluded police, ending in an intense six-week crime spree in West Kingston. Lurid reports about the spree appeared in the Daily Gleaner newspaper, which popularised his nickname "Rhyging".

=== Crime spree ===
The crime spree began when police attempted to capture him in August. After learning from an informer that he was at the Carib Hotel, several officers lay in wait for him there. Rhyging was in a room with a woman when the police burst in. He grabbed his gun and managed to shoot his way out, leaving one officer, a Detective Lewis, dead. Two other men were wounded: policeman H. E. Earle, and ex-sergeant Gallimore, a retired officer who was assisting. The killing of Lewis led the mayor of Kingston, Alexander Bustamante, to launch a major manhunt. Bustamante was a pallbearer at Lewis's funeral.

The following day he killed a woman named Lucille Tibby Young, the girlfriend of Eric Goldson, the man he believed had informed on him. He broke into her room and demanded she take him to Goldson. When she said she did not know where Goldson was, he shot her in the chest, killing her. He then also shot the two other women who were in the room at the time, Estella Brown and Iris Bailey, wounding them. Immediately after this the police offered a £200 reward for the capture of Rhyging, dead or alive. Rhyging responded by writing an open letter to Detective Sergeant Scott, one of the detectives leading the search for him. The letter, which was published in the Jamaica Times, stated,

I have an arsenal of 29 shots and I am satisfied that I have made history for the criminal element in Jamaica. Don't think that I am going to kill myself because this will only serve to spoil my great record. But I hope that Detective Scott will train his men some more. I am going to show the police force what is lacking and what I can do.

He killed another man a few days later. Jonathan Thomas, an associate of Rhyging, was walking along the street with his wife when Rhyging appeared and shot him. He then attempted to kill another man, Selvyn Maxwell, but Maxwell managed to wrestle the gun from Rhyging's hand. Rhyging escaped after stealing Maxwell's car. He was also involved in robberies, possibly to fund a planned escape from Jamaica. He was suspected of robbing the White Horses Inn at Mary Brown's Corner (during which a security guard was tied up) and a store near Rousseau Road.

The crime spree made Rhyging famous. During the spree, he sent taunting messages to the press and made a photograph of himself holding guns. In a letter to the Daily Gleaner he gave his own account of the shoot-out at the hotel,

I decided to make a dash. I ran to the door with my pistol in my hand. I did not even have time to reach for my close (sic). I looked outside. I heard the sound of another shot. I see the men mean to make the end of me tonight, but I intend to carry someone with me. At that time I only had five shots with me....I put myself outside. I was hit in my right shoulder. That did not make much.... One shot fired from this crowd hit the butt of my gun. I fired back. I think I saw every man except one man who was staggering.

Police circulated a description of Rhyging at the time, which stated that he was "5-foot 3 inches" tall, but tended to wear shoes with high heels to improve his stature. He also had "several front teeth missing in the upper jaw", but sometimes wore false teeth. He tended to wear polarised sunglasses and had "a habit of looking backwards after every few steps, and spitting after every few words he speaks".

=== Death ===
Rhyging hid out with some friends for a while near his childhood home in St. Catherine, but police were informed of his whereabouts. He managed to flee to Lime Cay, but again police were quickly tipped off. On 9 September 1948, they swooped on his hideout. He fought off police for an hour, but was killed when he attempted a break-out. He died, aged 24, of gunshot wounds on the beach at Lime Cay. He had been shot five times in the head, and several times all over his body. He may have been hiding at Lime Cay while waiting for a boat to take him to Cuba. Police at the time believed that he intended "to board a boat which would take him out of the island or to someplace on the south-western coast of the island."

Rhyging's body was held at the city mortuary before being buried in a pauper's grave. Large numbers of people came to see the body of the notorious criminal, including Eric Goldson, who reportedly commented "The race is not for the swift. Rhyging you gone at last!" In order to avoid large crowds gathering to see his burial, police stated that they were taking the body to Spanish Town. He was taken to May Pen cemetery, where he was buried quickly without ceremony.

== Posthumous fame ==
In the immediate aftermath of Rhyging's death the Gleaner ran stories exploring the life of the criminal; one, entitled "History of a Killer", was about his life, the other, "Who Was This Man with a Price on His Head", asked:

Who was Rhyging? This man with a price on his head whose twisted mind made him an enemy of society. Who was this five feet-three of ruthless killer who at the turn of last September blasted a blood-spattered path to newspaper headlines, with seven falling before his guns and three of the seven dead? Vincent Martin was his true name. In the puckish manner of his underworld comrades they named him Rhyging. Rhyging in their jargon means a man who is always on top. To them this snarling, boastful little gunman was top-notcher of the crime-filled west end.

Martin became a folk-hero for the poverty-stricken residents of the Jamaican ghettos of the 1940s, acquiring an anti-hero persona, "much like John Dillinger or Bonnie and Clyde". According to Kevin Aylmer, he became a "cultural icon of the Jamaican working class" because of his self-identification as a hero of "Hollywood 'oat operas', and his masculine swagger allied with an uncanny ability to seemingly appear and disappear at will". Shortly after his death Jamaican comedians Bim and Bam created a drama called Rhygin's Ghost. A song about him entitled "Rhygin" is the B-side of Prince Buster's 1965 single "Ten Commandments". He is also the subject of Louise Bennett-Coverley's 1966 poem "Dead Man", written in Jamaican patois. The poem "balances acceptance of the moral propriety of his necessary demise against the vicarious thrill of identification with his apparently indomitable badness".

His life inspired the 1972 film The Harder They Come, Jamaica's first feature film, starring Jimmy Cliff as Ivan Martin and directed by Perry Henzell. In the film Rhyging is portrayed as a reggae singer and song writer, who is tricked out of the rights to his songs and is drawn into drug-dealing, but becomes famous as he achieves notoriety for his crimes. According to Cliff, "Rhygin was very much on the side of the people; he was a kind of Robin Hood, I guess you could call him". Together with the movie Ivan is also referred to in the song "The Guns of Brixton" by the rock band The Clash.

Michael Thelwell's 1980 novel The Harder They Come, derived from the film, is also a sympathetic account of his life, and portrays him as an innocent victim of con-men when he first arrives in Kingston.

The film was later adapted as a stage musical, with a script overseen by Henzell, and was first staged in 2006 at the Theatre Royal Stratford East, subsequently transferring to other theatres, with Rolan Bell playing the role of Rhyging.

Rhyging continues to play a role in Jamaican culture as a duppy (bogeyman) used to scare children.
