= Suckers (band) =

American indie rock band

- Origin: Brooklyn, New York, United States
- Genres: Indie rock, indie pop, art rock
- Years active: 2007–2014
- Labels: Frenchkiss, IAMSOUND, Spunk
- Past members: Pan; Quinn Walker; Austin Fisher; Brian Aiken
- Website: suckersmusic.com

Suckers was an American, Brooklyn-based, indie rock band.

== Band members ==
- Quinn Walker - Vocals, guitar, sampler, percussion
- Austin Fisher - Guitar, keyboard, sampler, vocals
- Pan - Bass guitar, trumpet, drum pad, percussion, vocals
- Brian Aiken - Drums, keyboard, vocals

== Discography ==
=== Albums ===
- Suckers EP (2009)
- Wild Smile (2010)
- Candy Salad (2012)

=== Singles ===
- Out On The Water (2009)
- Black Sheep (2010)
