= Winston Stona =

Jamaican actor and businessman (1940–2022)

Winston Stona (1940 – 23 August 2022) was a Jamaican actor and businessman. He had roles in Cool Runnings (1993), The Harder They Come (1972), The Lunatic (1991), and One Love (2003). He was the co-founder of Busha Browne Company.

Stona died on 23 August 2022. He was 82.

== Filmography ==
- 1972: The Harder They Come: Detective Ray Jones
- 1991: The Lunatic: Linstrom
- 1993: Cool Runnings: Mr. Barrington Coolidge
- 2003: One Love: Pastor Johnson
- 2006: No Place Like Home: Winston
