= Carl Bradshaw (actor) =

Jamaican actor and film producer

Carl Bradshaw OD
- Born: Kingston, Jamaica
- Occupations: Actor, producer
- Years active: 1972–present

Carl Bradshaw OD is a Jamaican actor and film producer who has been described as "Jamaica's most renowned actor" and "arguably Jamaica's premier actor".

== Career ==
Carl Bradshaw grew up in the Kingston ghetto of Standpipe, and was educated at Excelsior High School. He was a keen actor and athlete as a teenager and his talent won him a scholarship at the University of Pennsylvania. He received a master's degree in Physical Science.

Bradshaw represented Jamaica in the 400m in 1968. He also competed in the 400m hurdles. He went on to take up the role of Head of Physical Education at Excelsior High School, where he was working when he was cast as Jose, one of the lead roles in Perry Henzell's 1973 film The Harder They Come, after initially getting involved as an extra. Bradshaw described how the role originated: "When I met Perry, there was no script. He asked me to make up a story for my character, so I gave him a line about some guy who'd owed me money for ages."

Carl Bradshaw appears in Grand Theft Auto IV as the host of the Tuff Gong Radio station.

He took the lead role of Ringo in the 1976 film Smile Orange, and also had roles on Countryman and Dancehall Queen, which he also co-produced while Director of Operations for Island Entertainment Jamaica. He went on to act in most of the major Jamaican films, including Third World Cop, One Love, Henzell's second film No Place Like Home, and the 2009 film Wah Do Dem. He played a Jamaican mystic in the 2011 supernatural thriller The Skin.

Bradshaw has won several awards for his acting, including the Doctor Bird Award and the Carifesta Film Festival Award of Excellence, and has been described as "Jamaica's most renowned actor" and "arguably Jamaica's premier actor". In October 2017 he was awarded the Order of Distinction by the Jamaican government.

== Filmography ==
=== Films ===
- The Harder They Come (1972) – Jose
- Smile Orange (1976) – Ringo
- Countryman (1982) – Captain Benchley
- Club Paradise (1986) – Cab Driver
- The Mighty Quinn (1989) – Cocodick
- Goldeneye (1989) – Magistrate
- The Lunatic (1991) – Service
- Kla$h (1995) – Walker
- Dancehall Queen (1997) – Police Officer #1 (also producer)
- Third World Cop (1999) – One Hand (also associate producer)
- Ritual (2002) – Ramon
- One Love (2003) – Obeah Man
- Runt (2005) – The Real Henry Davis (also associate producer)
- Almost Heaven (2005) – Shervin
- No Place Like Home (2006) – Carl
- Wah Do Dem (2009) – Mystic Man
- Better Mus' Come (2011) – Rasta Elder

=== Television ===
- Runaway Bay (1992–1993) – Inspector Grant
