= Bim and Bam =

Jamaican comedy duo

Bim and Bam was the stage name of the Jamaican comedy double-act Ed Lewis (1914–1976) and Aston Wynter (1913–1978). They made a name for themselves in Jamaica in the 1930s performing at hotels and clubs, initially adopting the blackface Minstrel show format of the era. They graduated to creating and performing comedy-dramas scripted by Bim (Lewis) for a cast of twelve actors. Bim later married singer and comedian Hyacinth Clover, sister of Ken Boothe. Under the stage-name "Clover" she became a regular member of the troupe. After this they were sometimes billed as "Bim, Bam and Clover".

Their shows were typically structured as a comic courtroom drama, in which the judge would preside over a chaotic inquiry. Various "witnesses" would perform acts nominally related to the supposed investigation into the case, thus creating, in effect, a variety show. Shows they created included The Healing of the Bamyard, The Case of the Baldhead Rooster, Rhygin's Ghost and Laughter in the Court. Their most popular show was The Case of John Ras I. Ska musician Derrick Morgan began his career as a member of their troupe. Roland Alphonso also toured with them in the 1950s.

The duo and Clover later played straight roles in the 1972 film The Harder They Come, a version of the life of Rhyging, a notorious Jamaican criminal they had earlier portrayed satirically in Rhygin's Ghost. As "Bim, Bam and Clover" they released a number of comedy records. Bim and Clover also regularly recorded songs together. Their 1975 comic dialogue song "Sweet Heart", an argument between a husband and wife about infidelities, was a popular hit in Jamaica.

The team toured Jamaica, Bermuda, New York and England. After their deaths Clover continued to run their production company performing her husband's plays.
