= Dancehall Queen =

- Directed by: Don Letts; Rick Elgood
- Written by: Suzanne Fenn; Ed Wallace; Don Letts
- Produced by: Carl Bradshaw; Carolyn Pfeiffer; Chris Blackwell
- Starring: Audrey Reid; Paul Campbell; Beenie Man; Cherine Anderson
- Cinematography: Louis Mulvey
- Edited by: Suzanne Fenn
- Music by: Wally Badarou
- Release date: 10 October 1997
- Running time: 98 minutes
- Languages: Jamaican Patois, English

Dancehall Queen is a 1997 indie Jamaican film written by Suzanne Fenn, Ed Wallace and Don Letts, starring Audrey Reid, who plays Marcia, a street vendor struggling to raise a bad-tempered daughter, Tanya (Cherine Anderson). Directed by Don Letts and Rick Elgood.

== Plot ==
Marcia Green (Audrey Reid) is a single mom and street vendor barely scraping by even with a financial assist from the seemingly avuncular Larry (Carl Davis), a gun-toting strongman with a twisted desire for Marcia's teenage daughter Tanya (Cherine Anderson) who he then decides to pursue. Complicating things is Priest (Paul Campbell), a murderous hoodlum who killed Marcia's friend and now is terrorizing the defenseless woman. Facing three big problems (Larry, Priest, and without money), Marcia arrives at an inspired solution: develop an alter ego, a dancing celebrity called the Mystery Lady who can compete in a cash-prize contest and put both of the men against one another.

She does so and Marcia very amusingly carries out her complicated plan, with a little help from sympathetic friends.

== Cast ==
- Audrey Reid as Marcia, a struggling street vendor, who decides to use dancing to better her situation. So, she takes on the persona of the Mystery Lady, to raise money.
- Cherine Anderson as Tanya, Marcia's older daughter. Trying to live a normal life, she has to deal with the advances of Larry, the wealthy man that her mother seeks money from.
- Mark Danvers as Junior, Marcia's younger brother and Tanya's uncle. After witnessing his friend's death, at the hands of Priest, he fears he'll be murdered next.
- Carl Davis as Larry, a well-off man, who has an interest in Tanya, he falls for the Mystery Lady.
- Paul Campbell as Priest, the knife-wielding hoodlum who's pursuing Marcia
- Carl Bradshaw as Police Officer #1
- Beenie Man as himself
- Lady Saw as herself
- Paula Ouch as herself
- Debbie Ouch as herself
- Nicky Ouch as herself

== Soundtrack ==
Dancehall Queen mixed recent hits with songs created for the movie, including the title track by Beenie Man.
