= Laurence Merrick =

American film director and author

- Born: Zehev Lahav; April 22, 1926; Petah Tikva, Mandatory Palestine
- Died: January 26, 1977 (aged 50); Hollywood, Los Angeles, California, U.S.
- Occupation: Film director

Laurence Merrick (born Zehev Lahav; April 22, 1926 – January 26, 1977) was an American film director and author.

He is best known for co-directing the Oscar nominated documentary film Manson in 1973 with Robert Hendrickson. Sharon Tate, one of the victims in the Manson murders, was a former student at Merrick's Academy of Dramatic Arts.

His later business was Merrick Studios, 870 N. Vine St. in Hollywood. It was a low-cost acting school, with several students attending via the GI Bill.

Merrick was killed by a gunman on January 26, 1977. He was shot in the back in the parking lot of his acting school. Merrick's murder went unsolved for over four years, until October 1981 when 35-year-old Dennis Mignano of San Jose, California, confessed to police. At his subsequent trial, Mignano was found not guilty by reason of insanity and committed to a mental hospital. An unemployed would-be actor and singer with a long history of psychiatric problems, Mignano contended that he had auditioned at Merrick's school, and that during the audition, black magic spells were cast upon him that later contributed to his psychiatric problems.
