= The Harder They Come =

1972 Jamaican crime film

- Newspaper advert
- Directed by: Perry Henzell
- Written by: Perry Henzell; Trevor D. Rhone
- Produced by: Perry Henzell; Uncredited: Chris Blackwell
- Starring: Jimmy Cliff
- Cinematography: Peter Jessop; David McDonald; Franklyn St Juste
- Edited by: Reicland Anderson; John Victor-Smith; Richard White
- Music by: Jimmy Cliff; Desmond Dekker; The Slickers; The Maytals
- Production company: International Films Inc.
- Distributed by: New World Pictures
- Release dates: 5 June 1972 (Kingston, Jamaica); 1972 (VIFF); 8 February 1973 (United States)
- Running time: 109 minutes
- Country: Jamaica
- Languages: Jamaican English; Jamaican Patois
- Budget: J$400,000 or $150,000

The Harder They Come is a 1972 Jamaican crime film directed by Perry Henzell and co-written by Trevor D. Rhone, and starring Jimmy Cliff. The film and The Harder They Come soundtrack played an important role in introducing reggae to international audiences.

Enormously successful in Jamaica, the film also reached the international market and has been described as "possibly the most influential of Jamaican films and one of the most important films from the Caribbean".

== Plot ==
Ivanhoe "Ivan" Martin is a young and poor man living in rural Jamaica. After his grandmother dies, he leaves the countryside for the city of Kingston, where he is immediately conned out of all his possessions by a street vendor. Though his mother tells him that city life is hard, she suggests he might find work with a local Christian preacher.

Ivan then meets José, who takes him to see Django, a spaghetti Western film. Excited by urban life, Ivan desperately tries to get a job but is repeatedly turned away. Finally, he turns to the preacher his mother suggested, who offers him only menial jobs under the scrutiny of Longa, an older church worker.

In contrast with his unhappiness about the church jobs, Ivan pursues his romantic interest in the preacher's ward, Elsa. But many of the church members believe the preacher might be grooming her to be his own romantic partner, increasing the conflict between him and the preacher.

After building a bicycle from an abandoned frame he finds, he delivers the preacher's recording to Hilton, a prominent record producer, then asks Hilton for a chance to audition. That night, he borrows the key to the church from Elsa so he can practice his secular audition song in the chapel. The preacher discovers the rehearsal, and enraged, fires Ivan then chastises Elsa, jealously accusing her of fornication.

Ivan returns to the church compound the next day to collect the bicycle he built, but Longa claims it as his own. Ivan picks a fight, ultimately slashing Longa brutally with a knife. The police sentence Ivan to a violent whipping, and when he's released, he and Elsa move in together.

Ivan records his song, "The Harder They Come", at Hilton's recording studio. But with Hilton's payola stranglehold on the local music industry, Ivan's only option is to sign Hilton's exploitative $20 contract. However, unbeknownst to Ivan, Hilton decides to play the song only enough to recoup his investment, and not enough to let Ivan become a music superstar.

Meanwhile, Elsa has struggled to find work and, concerned about money, stays home instead of going out to celebrate Ivan's song release. At the club, Ivan runs into José, who offers him a job running marijuana. Ivan complains about the poor pay, concerned that he's being taken advantage of. Not knowing that the drug runners are protected from arrest by José's deal with Detective Jones, a corrupt police official, Ivan purchases a pair of guns for protection.

Ivan learns that a delivery he made was valued at $100,000, and he continues to complain about his meager pay. In response, José and Detective Jones arrange for a policeman to arrest Ivan, but, remembering his earlier whipping, Ivan shoots and kills the officer.

Ivan has a tryst with José's girlfriend, during which the police ambush him. He evades capture by killing three officers. When he returns home, he tells Elsa that, through these crimes, he is finally getting the fame he's always wanted. He then gets his revenge by killing José's girlfriend and making a failed attempt to kill José.

Capitalizing on Ivan's notoriety, Hilton turns Ivan's song into a radio hit. Ivan tries to do the same, taking photos as a two-gun outlaw and sending them to the press.

As Ivan's status rises, the police work harder to catch and kill him. Detective Jones, tasked with capturing Ivan, temporarily shuts down his protection racket to starve the community of their drug money, thereby pressuring the other drug runners to turn Ivan in. He forces the press to not publish Ivan's photos and bans Ivan's song from the radio.

During another shootout, Ivan's shoulder is wounded, and he only narrowly escapes. His closest drug-dealer friend, Pedro, helps him hide out and suggests that he escape to Cuba. But the community grows increasingly desperate without their drug trade money. Elsa, deciding she has no other way to survive, tells the police of Ivan's plans to flee.

Ivan swims out to the ship to Cuba, but not having the strength to climb aboard, he passes out. Waking up on the beach, he is ambushed by a police assault team. The police's approach is intercut with the sounds and images of a movie audience cheering Ivan on as if he is a hero character. He emerges from his hiding area, holding his two guns, and is shot to death.

The film ends with a woman dancing to Ivan's song.

== Cast ==
- Jimmy Cliff as Ivanhoe "Ivan" Martin
- Janet Bartley as Elsa
- Carl Bradshaw as Jose
- Ras Daniel Heartman as Pedro
- Basil Keane as The Preacher
- Elijah Chambers as Longa
- Bob Charlton as Hilton
- Volier Johnson as Pushcart Boy
- Winston Stona as Detective Ray Jones
- Lucia White as Mother
- Carlton Lee as Recording Engineer
- Prince Buster as DJ at Dance
- Beverly Anderson as Housewife
- Clover Lewis as Market Woman
- Ed "Bim" Lewis as Photographer
- Bobby Loban as Fitz
- Joanne Dunn as Barmaid
- Adrian Robinson as Editor
- Don Topping as DJ
- Karl Leslie as Freddie
- Sandra Redwood as Girl
- Aston "Bam" Wynter as Drunk
- Alton Ellis as Ivan's Double
- Ulla Fraser and Carol Lawes as Elsa's Friends
- Duke Reid as Police Commissioner
- Joe Gibbs as A Reggae Producer

== Production ==
The film stars reggae singer Jimmy Cliff, who plays Ivanhoe Martin, a character based upon a real-life Jamaican criminal of that name, better known as Rhyging, who achieved fame in the 1940s. Prior to filming, the project had a working title of Rhygin. This then changed to Hard Road to Travel before finally being changed to The Harder They Come, prompting Cliff to write the song of the same name. The story very loosely follows the real Martin/Rhyging's life updated to the 1970s, though the historical Rhyging was neither a musician nor drug dealer.

Cliff's previous acting experience had come from school productions. Other major roles in the film were played by Janet Bartley (Elsa), Basil Keane (Preacher), Ras Daniel Hartman (Pedro), Beverly Anderson (Upper St. Andrew Housewife), Bob Charlton (Hilton), Volair Johnson (Pushcart Boy), and well known comedians Bim and Bam: Ed "Bim" Lewis (Photographer), and Aston "Bam" Wynter (Drunken Husband). Legendary ska musician Prince Buster (DJ at Dance) makes a cameo in the movie, telling the audience to "sit tight and listen keenly!" Other personalities from the Jamaican music industry, such as Duke Reid, who appears as a police commissioner, Jamaican-Chinese Carlton Lee, portraying himself as a sound engineer, and producer Joe Gibbs, all make brief appearances on screen.

Production began in 1970, but "dragged [for the next two years] due to inadequate funding".

== Soundtrack ==
The soundtrack to the film is considered a breakthrough for reggae in the United States.

- "The Harder They Come" recorded at Dynamic Sounds, Kingston
- "You Can Get It If You Really Want" performed by Jimmy Cliff, composed by Jimmy Cliff
- "Hold Your Brakes" performed by Scotty, composed by D. Harriot and D. Scott
- "Pressure Drop" performed by the Maytals, composed by Frederick "Toots" Hibbert
- "Many Rivers to Cross" performed by Jimmy Cliff, composed by Jimmy Cliff
- "Johnny Too Bad" performed by the Slickers, composed by D. Crooks, R. Beckford, W. Bailey, T. Wilson
- "007 Shanty Town" performed by Desmond Dekker, composed by D. Dares
- "Sweet and Dandy" performed by the Maytals, composed by Frederick "Toots" Hibbert
- "The Harder They Come" performed by Jimmy Cliff, composed by Jimmy Cliff
- "Rivers of Babylon" performed by the Melodians, composed by B. Dowe
- "Sitting in Limbo" performed by Jimmy Cliff, composed by Jimmy Cliff

== Release ==
The film was a sensation in Jamaica due to its naturalistic portrayal of black Jamaicans in real locations and its use of Jamaican Patois, the local creole. According to Henzell, "Black people seeing themselves on the screen for the first time created an unbelievable audience reaction".

The film premiered at the Carib Theatre in Kingston, Jamaica, on 5 June 1972, and was then released in February 1973 in New York City by Roger Corman's New World Pictures to little attention. It became more popular when it was played to midnight audiences nationwide the following April. However, the popularity of the movie was limited outside of Jamaica because the local patois spoken by the characters was so thick that it required subtitles, making it possibly "the first English language movie in history to require subtitles in the United States".

=== Digital restoration ===
In 2006, the film was digitally restored by Prasad Corporation, recapturing its original look by cleaning it frame by frame to remove dirt, tears, scratches, and other artifacts.

== Reception ==
On the review aggregator website Rotten Tomatoes, 91% of 43 critics' reviews are positive, with an average rating of 7.6/10. The website's consensus reads: "The Harder They Come boasts hard-hitting drama and insightful social commentary, all matched beat for beat by a flawless soundtrack." Metacritic, which uses a weighted average, assigned the film a score of 77 out of 100, based on 16 critics, indicating "generally favorable" reviews. Roger Ebert of the Chicago Sun-Times gave the film 2 1/2 stars out of 4, writing that the early scenes established compelling settings and characters before deteriorating into Blaxploitation-crime cliches: "[the] movie’s ending is an exercise in plot; its beginning and its music deserve better than that". The staff of Variety magazine wrote that the film "has a sharp and racy rhythm, in keeping with the syncopated music of the isle, plus an underlying social theme in the guise of a familiar tale".

== Legacy ==
=== Novelization ===
In 1980, Jamaican-American author Michael Thelwell published a novel based on the film, using the same title. Thelwell inserted many Jamaican proverbs into the novel that were unused in the film.

=== Stage ===
In 2005, The Harder They Come was adapted into a stage musical by the Theatre Royal Stratford East and UK Arts International in the UK, with a script overseen by Henzell. The show opened on 25 March 2006, boasting the original soundtrack as well as a couple of additions, including "The Ganja Song", written by Geraldine Connor, featuring Rolan Bell as Ivan. The production later moved to the Playhouse Theatre, and was performed in Toronto and Miami.

The Harder They Come, Suzan-Lori Parks' musical adaptation of the film, was staged at New York's Public Theater in early 2023.

After a successful run at the Theatre Royal Stratford East in 2025, the musical returned to the same venue in May 2026.

=== Music ===
English punk band the Clash reference lead character Ivan in the song "The Guns of Brixton". Big Audio Dynamite sample the line "Sit tight and listen keenly" on their song "C'mon Every Beatbox".

== See also ==
- List of cult films
- List of hood films
