= No Place Like Home (2006 film) =

No Place Like Home is a 2006 documentary about a man's experiences in the aftermath of Hurricane Katrina directed by Courtney Fathom Sell and co-produced by Jac Currie.

== Plot summary ==
Filmed in roughly one month between the end of October and the beginning of December 2005, Mr. Sell's film is a portrayal of 'Defend New Orleans' creator Jac Currie’s life after Hurricane Katrina and one of his first trips back to the Gulf Coast after being stranded in New York City. It shows Defend New Orleans’ transition to a valid social aid project and features some of the earliest produced footage of post-Katrina Mississippi Gulf Coast and New Orleans.

'No Place Like Home' features a soundtrack made by musicians personally connected with the subjects and interviews with friends who survived Katrina in New Orleans. All proceeds from DVD sales go directly towards Gulf Coast restoration funds.

== Background ==
'Defend New Orleans' is a non-profit organization founded by New Orleans resident Jac Currie in 2004.

== Awards and honors ==
Though the film was shot entirely on a handheld hi-8 video camera on a $200.00 budget, 'No Place Like Home' received 'Best Picture' at the 2006 Blue November Film Festival in Tulsa, Oklahoma, and was screened internationally at the legendary Casablanca Theater in Dresden, Germany. In February 2007, 'Defend New Orleans' creator Jac Currie appeared on The Ellen DeGeneres Show to promote the organization and the film.

== Distribution ==
Emphasis Entertainment Group (EEG) has entered an output agreement with independent filmmaker Courtney Fathom Sell and his Slumlord Productions company. The first release slated for Summer of 2008, will be Sell’s Award Winning and Critically Acclaimed Documentary "No Place Like Home".
