= Robert Hendrickson (director) =

American film director

- Born: September 17, 1944; Los Angeles, California
- Died: October 1, 2016 (aged 72); Los Angeles, California
- Occupation: Film director

Robert Hendrickson (17 September 1944 – 1 October 2016) was an American documentary filmmaker.

== Manson ==
He was known as the co-director of the Oscar nominated documentary Manson about the "Manson Family" which he directed together with partner Laurence Merrick.

== Career ==
He authored the book Death to Pigs and also directed the films Close Shave (1979) and Inside the Manson Gang (2007).

== Death ==
His last public appearance was at the August 9, 2016 showing of his documentary at the New Beverly Cinema in Los Angeles. He died on October 1, 2016.
