= List of Jamaican films =

This is a list of films produced or shot on location in Jamaica, in alphabetical order.

== # ==
- 20,000 Leagues Under The Sea (1954), the cannibals scene

== A ==
- Awake Zion (2005)

== B ==
- Belly (1998)

== C ==
- Club Paradise (1986)
- Cocktail (1988)
- Cool Runnings (1993)
- Countryman (1982)

== D ==
- Dancehall Queen (1997)
- Dr. No (1962)

== F ==
- Finding Samuel Lowe: From Harlem to China (2015)

== G ==
- Glory to Gloriana (2006)

== H ==
- The Harder They Come (1972)

== I ==
- Inna de Yard: The Soul of Jamaica (2019)
- The Intent 2: The Come Up (2018)
- It's All About Dancing: A Jamaican Dance-U-Mentary (2006)

== K ==
- Kingston Paradise (2013)
- Knight And Day (2010)

== L ==
- Live and Let Die (1973)
- Legends of the Fall (1994)

== M ==
- Marked for Death (1990)
- Manfish (1956)

== N ==
- No Time to Die (2021)
- No Turning Back (2022)

== O ==
- One Love (2003)
- Out The Gate (2011)

== P ==
- Predator 2 (1990)
- Papillon (1973)

== R ==
- Reincarnated (2013)
- Respect the Jux (2022)
- Ring Games (2016)
- Rise Up (2007)
- Rockers (1978)

== S ==
- Shottas (2002)
- Smile Orange (1976)
- Sprinter (2018)

== T ==
- Third World Cop (1999)

== W ==
- When Morning Comes (2022)
- Wide Sargasso Sea (1993)

== See also ==
- Cinema of the Caribbean
- Jamaican literature
