= Multiracial people =

People of multiple races

The term multiracial people refers to people who are of two or more races, while the term multi-ethnic people refers to people who are of more than one ethnicity. A variety of terms are or have been used for multiracial or multi-ethnic people in a variety of contexts, including multiethnic, polyethnic, bi-ethnic (occasion), biracial, mixed-race, and more specific terms. A number of older terms are now considered slurs, such as “half-breed” and “half-caste”, in addition to those that were initially coined for pejorative use.

Individuals of multiracial backgrounds make up a significant portion of the population in many parts of the world. In North America, studies have found that the multiracial population is continuing to grow. In many countries of Central and South America, people of mixed European and Native heritage make up the majority of the population (Panama, Bolivia, Peru, Colombia...). In the Caribbean, multiracial people officially make up the majority of the population in the Dominican Republic (73%) and Aruba (68%).

== Definitions ==
While defining race is controversial, race remains a commonly used term for classification, often related to visible physical characteristics or known community. Insofar as race is defined differently in different cultures, perceptions of mixed race are subjective.

=== Related terms ===
The terms "multi-ethnic people" or "ethnically mixed people" refer to people who are of more than one ethnicity. In the English language, the terms miscegenation and amalgamation were used for unions between white people, Black people, and other ethnic groups. The term 'miscegenation' initially replaced 'amalgamation' due to the latter's association with slavery in the 1800s, while 'miscegenation' is today often considered offensive and controversial. The terms mixed-race, biracial or multiracial are becoming generally accepted. In other languages, terms for miscegenation are not necessarily considered offensive.

In the English-speaking world, many terms for mixed-race people exist, some of which are pejorative or are no longer used. “Half-breed” is a historic term for people of partial Native American ancestry, now considered a slur. Mestee, once widely used, is now used mostly for members of historically mixed-race groups, such as Louisiana Creoles, Melungeons, Redbones, Brass Ankles and Chestnut Ridge people.

=== Africa ===
In East Africa, specifically Uganda, Kenya and Tanzania (including portions of the East African Community), people of mixed race are called half-castes (in English) or chotara (singular, in Swahili), wachotara (plural in Swahili).

In South Africa and much of English-speaking southern Africa, the term Coloured was used to describe both mixed-race persons of African and European descent, and those Asians not of African descent.

=== Latin America ===
In the Spanish and Portuguese Americas, populations became triracial after the introduction of African slavery. Several terms developed during the Spanish and Portuguese colonial periods, including terms such as zambo for persons of Native American and native African descent. Charts and diagrams intended to explain the classifications were common. The well-known Casta paintings in Mexico and, to some extent, Peru, were illustrations of the different classifications. Mulatto, zambo and mestizo are used in Spanish; mulato, caboclo, cafuzo, ainoko (from Japanese) and mestiço in Portuguese; and mulâtre and métis in French. Terms such as mulatto for people of partially African descent and mestizo for people of partially Native American descent are still used by English-speaking people of the Western Hemisphere but mostly to refer to the past or to the demography of Hispanophone America and its diasporic population.

At one time, Hispanophone American census categories have used such classifications. In Brazilian censuses since Imperial times, for example, most persons of mixed heritage, except Asian Brazilians with some European descent (or any other to the extent it is not clearly perceptible) and vice versa, tend to be thrown into the single category of "pardo". But racial boundaries in Brazil are related less to ancestry than to phenotype. A westernized Amerindian with copper-colored skin may also be classified as a "pardo", a caboclo in this case, despite not being mixed race. A European-looking person, even with one or more native African or Indigenous ancestors, is not classified as "pardo" but as "branco", a white Brazilian. The same applies to "negros", Afro-Brazilians whose European or Native American ancestors are not visible in their appearance. According to genetic research, most Brazilians of all racial groups (except Asian-Brazilians and natives) are, to some extent, mixed-race.

=== North America ===
According to American sociologist Troy Duster and ethicist Pilar Ossorio:

Some percentage of people who look native European will possess genetic markers indicating that a significant majority of their recent ancestors were African. Some percentage of people who look African or Native African will possess genetic markers indicating the majority of their recent ancestors were European.

In the United States:

Many state and local agencies comply with the U.S. Office of Management and Budget (OMB) 1997 revised standards for the collection, tabulation, and presentation of federal data on race and ethnicity. The revised OMB standards identify a minimum of five racial categories: European American; African American; Native American and Alaska Native; Asian; and Native Hawaiian and Other Pacific Islander. Perhaps the most significant change for Census 2000 was that respondents were given the option to mark one or more races on the questionnaire to indicate their racial identity. Census 2000 race data are shown for people who reported a race either alone or in combination with one or more other races.

In the United States and Canada, the term mixed-blood has historically been described as people of multiracial backgrounds, in particular mixed European and Native American ancestry. Today, the term is often seen as pejorative. Some of the most prominent multi-racial people in 19th-century America were "mixed-blood" or mixed-race descendants of fur traders and Native American women along the northern frontier. The fur traders tended to be men of social standing and they often married or had relationships with daughters of Native American chiefs, consolidating social standing on both sides. They held high economic status of what was for years in the 18th and 19th centuries a two-tier society at settlements at trading posts, with other Europeans, American Indians, and mixed-blood workers below them.

In the Southeast Woodlands, tribes began having inter-generational marriage and sexual relationships with the Europeans in the early 1700s. Many Cherokee bands and families were quick to see the economic benefits of having trade, land and business dealings with Europeans, strengthened through marriages. Prominent Cherokee and Creek leaders of the 19th century were of mixed-descent but, born to Indian mothers in matrilineal kinship societies, they identified fully and were accepted as Indian and grew up in those cultures.

In Canada, the Métis are a recognized ethnic group of mixed European and Indigenous American descent, who have status in the law similar to that of First Nations. Mixed-blood is also used occasionally in Canadian accounts to refer to the 19th century Anglo-Métis population rather than Métis, which referred to a specific cultural group of people of First Nations and French descent, with their own language, Michif.

== Africa ==
=== Madagascar ===
Madagascar was settled between the first and ninth centuries AD by two groups: Austronesian peoples who arrived on outrigger canoes from across the Indian Ocean, and Bantu peoples who crossed the Mozambique Channel from mainland Africa. These two groups intermixed, forming the modern Malagasy people; later migrants from Arabia, Somalia, and India added to the genetic mixture.

Virtually all Malagasy people are of some degree of mixed descent; however, the amount of mixture varies greatly between regions of Madagascar, despite all Malagasy people sharing a common language and similar cultural elements. The Malagasy of the central highlands of Madagascar have predominantly Austronesian ancestry, the Malagasy of the west coast and the south of the island have predominantly Bantu ancestry, and Malagasy of the island's east coast are of roughly equal degrees Bantu and Austronesian ancestry. The average Malagasy person's genetic makeup includes a roughly equal blend of Southeast Asian and of East African genes.

=== North Africa ===
North Africa has numerous mixed-race communities, reflecting a history of both extensive Mediterranean trade around the region and later colonization and migration by African groups. Among these are the Haratin, oasis-dwellers of Saharan southern Morocco, Algeria, and Mauritania. They are believed to be an ethnicity composed of Sub-Saharan African and Berber ancestry. They constitute a socially and ethnically distinct group within the Maghreb.

For centuries, Arab slave traders sold sub-Saharan Africans as slaves in cumulatively large numbers throughout the Persian Gulf, Anatolia, Central Asia and the Arab world. Communities descended from these slaves and local peoples can be found throughout these regions.

=== South Africa ===
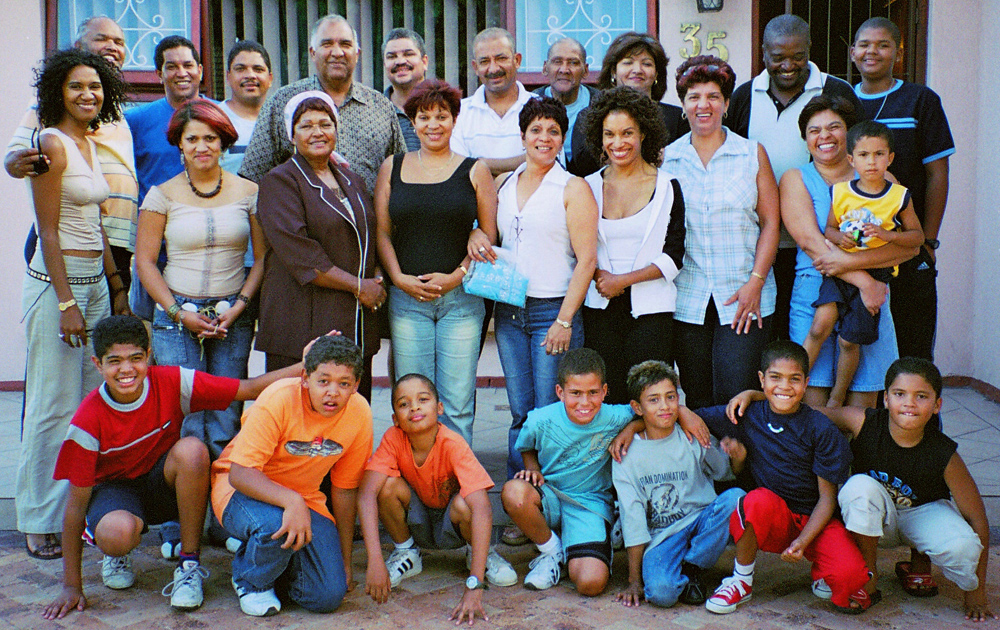
Extended Coloured family from South Africa.

In South Africa, the Prohibition of Mixed Marriages Act of 1949 prohibited marriage between white Europeans (people of European descent) and non-Whites (being classified as Black, Asian and Coloured). This followed centuries of interaction and unions resulting in mixed-race children. This law was repealed in 1985.

Mixed-race South Africans are commonly referred to as Coloureds. According to the 2016 South African Census, they are the second-largest ethnic group (8.8%), behind Native Africans, or Native African Bantu peoples, who constitute (80.8%) of the current population. European South Africans make up 8.1%.

== Asia ==
=== China ===
Multiracial people in the People's Republic of China are those considered to belong to more than one race or whose parents are considered to belong to different races. In a Chinese context, this generally involves one parent belonging to the Han majority and the other belonging to one of the nation's minority groups. In foreign coverage, discussion generally focuses on the children of a Chinese citizen and a foreigner.

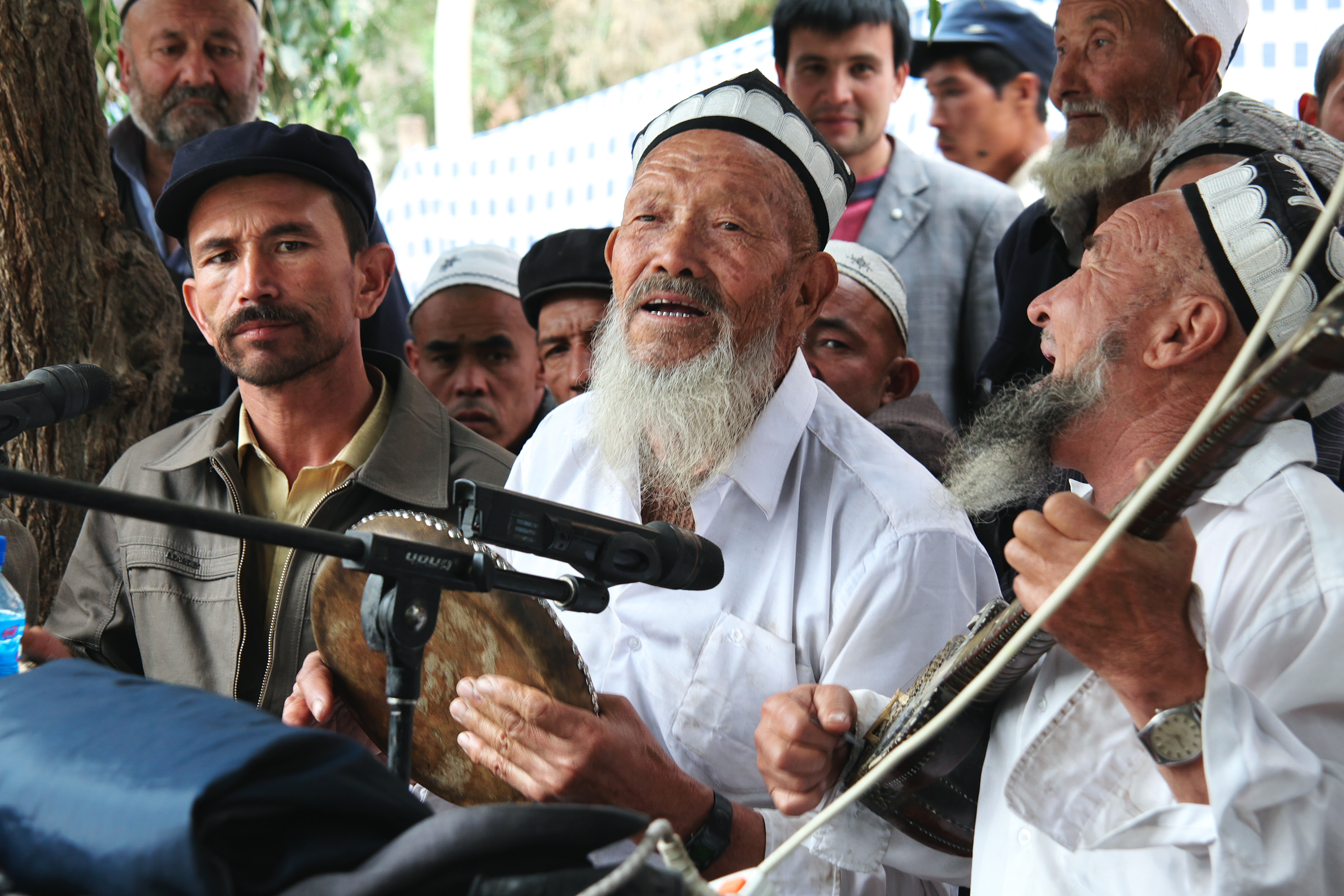
Uyghur musicians in Yarkand, Xinjiang

The Uyghurs are often cited as an example of a population with mixed East Asian and West Eurasian ancestry. Genetic studies have found that modern Uyghurs derive substantial ancestry from both East Asian and West Eurasian populations, reflecting centuries of admixture along the Silk Road. Analyses of maternal and paternal lineages have suggested that this admixture may have been sex-biased, with East Asian ancestry being more common in maternal lineages and West Eurasian ancestry more common in paternal lineages.

=== India ===
The people of the Indian subcontinent have a diverse genetic pool, being composed of South Asian hunter-gatherers, Neolithic Iranians, and Western Steppe Herders. This makes up the genome of modern-day Indians and varies from caste and region.

Prior to colonization, the peoples of India had a long history of trade and other interaction with other peoples. More recently a Eurasian mix developed during the Colonial period, beginning with the French, Dutch, Portuguese and other European traders and merchants, including British. Such interaction continued during the British Rule in India, although it lessened as British families settled in the country. The estimated population of Anglo-Indians, the term for these Eurasians, is 600,000 worldwide, with the majority living in India and the UK.

Article 366(2) of the Indian Constitution defines Anglo-Indian as:

(2) an Anglo-Indian means a person whose father or any of whose other male progenitors in the male line is or was of European descent but who is domiciled within the territory of India and is or was born within such territory of parents habitually resident therein and not established there for temporary purposes only;

=== Myanmar ===
Myanmar (formerly Burma) was a British colony from 1826 until 1948. Other European nationals were active in the country before the British arrived. Intermarriage and relationships took place among such settlers and merchants with the local Burmese population, and subsequently between British colonists and the Burmese. The local Eurasian population is known as the Anglo-Burmese. This group dominated colonial society and through the early years of independence. After Burma gained independence in 1948, many Anglo-Burmese left the country; the diaspora resides primarily in Australia, New Zealand and the UK. An estimated 52,000 Anglo-Burmese live in Burma.

=== Philippines ===
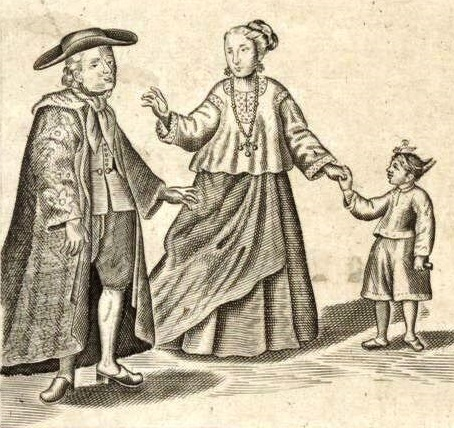
Mestizos as illustrated in the Carta Hydrographica y Chorographica de las Yslas Filipinas, 1734.

The Philippines was a Spanish colony for almost four centuries, or 333 years. The United States took it over after the Spanish-American War, ruling for 46 years. Many Filipinos are mixed Spanish Filipino, and according to Fedor Jagor, one-third of Luzon which holds half the Philippine population, has Spanish or Spanish American admxiture. And it also has Philippine-American descent.

After the defeat of Spain during the Spanish–American War in 1898, the Philippines and other remaining Spanish colonies were ceded to the United States in the Treaty of Paris. The Philippines was under U.S. sovereignty until 1946, though occupied by Japan during World War II. In 1946, in the Treaty of Manila, the U.S. recognized the Republic of the Philippines as an independent nation. Even after 1946, the U.S. maintained a strong military presence in the Philippines, with as many as 21 U.S. military bases and 100,000 U.S. military personnel stationed there as defense in Asia and during the Vietnam War.

After the bases closed in 1992, American troops left, often abandoning partners and their Amerasian children. The Pearl S. Buck International foundation estimates there are 52,000 Amerasians in the Philippines, with 5,000 in the Clark area of Angeles City. An academic research paper presented in the U.S. (in 2012) by an Angeles, Pampanga, Philippines Amerasian college research study unit suggests that the number could be a lot more, possibly reaching 250,000. This is also partially due to the fact that almost all Amerasians intermarried with other Amerasians and Filipino natives. The newer Amerasians from the United States would add to the already older settlement of peoples from other countries in the Americas that happened when the Philippines was under Spanish rule, as the Philippines once received immigrants from Spanish occupied Panama, Peru, and Mexico.

In the United States, intermarriage between Filipinos and other ethnicities is common. They have the highest number of interracial marriages among Asian immigrant groups, as documented in California. Some 21.8% of Philippine-Americans are of mixed ancestry.

=== Singapore and Malaysia ===
According to government statistics, the population of Singapore as of September 2007 was 4.68 million. Mixed-race people, including Chindians and Eurasians, formed 2.4%.

In Singapore and Malaysia, the majority of inter-ethnic marriages are between Chinese and Indians. The offspring of such marriages are informally known as "Chindian". The Malaysian government classifies them only by their father's ethnicity. As the majority of these intermarriages usually involve an Indian groom and Chinese bride, the majority of Chindians in Malaysia are usually classified as "Indian" by the government. As for the Malays, who are predominantly Muslim, legal restrictions in Malaysia make it uncommon for them to intermarry with either the Indians, who are predominantly Hindu, or the Chinese, who are predominantly Buddhist and Taoist. But Indian Muslims and Arabs in Singapore and Malaysia often take local Malay wives, because of their common Islamic faith.

The Chitty people, in Singapore and the Malacca state of Malaysia, are Tamils with considerable Malay ancestry. The early Tamil settlers took local wives, as they had not brought their own women at that time. In the East Malaysian states of Sabah and Sarawak, intermarriage has been common between Chinese and native tribespeople, such as the Murut and Dusun in Sabah, and the Iban and Bisaya in Sarawak. A mixture of cultures has resulted in both states. The offspring of these marriages are called "Sino-(name of tribe)", e.g. Sino-Dusun. Normally, children are strongly affected by the father's ethnicity and culture, being raised in his culture. These Sino-natives usually become fluent in both Malay and English. A smaller number are able to speak Chinese dialects and Mandarin, especially those who have received education in vernacular Chinese schools.

=== Sri Lanka ===
Due to its strategic location in the Indian Ocean, the island of Sri Lanka has been a confluence for settlers from various parts of the world. There are several mixed-race ethnicities in the island. The most notable mixed-race group is the Sri Lankan Moors, who trace their ancestry to Arab traders who settled on the island and intermarried with local women. Today, the Sri Lankan Moors live primarily in urban communities. They preserve Arab-Islamic cultural heritage while adopting many Southern Asian customs.

The Burghers are a Eurasian ethnic group. They are descendants through paternal lines of European colonists from the 16th to 20th centuries (mostly Portuguese, Dutch, German and British) and with maternal ancestry among local women. Other European minorities in such admixtures include Swedish, Norwegian, French and Irish.

The Sri Lanka Kaffirs are an ethnic group partially descended from 16th-century Portuguese traders and their enslaved Africans. The Kaffirs spoke a distinctive creole based on Portuguese, the Sri Lanka Kaffir language, which is now extinct. Their cultural heritage includes the dance styles Kaffringna and Manja, as well as the Portuguese Sinhalese, Creole, Afro-Sinhalese varieties.

=== Vietnam ===
Under terms of the Geneva Accords of 1954, departing French troops took thousands of Vietnamese wives and children with them after the First Indochina War. Some Eurasians stayed in Vietnam, after independence from French rule.

=== West Asia ===
Ottoman slave traders sold slaves in cumulatively large numbers over the centuries throughout the Persian Gulf, Anatolia, Central Asia and the Arab world and communities descended from these slaves can be found throughout these regions.

== Caribbean ==
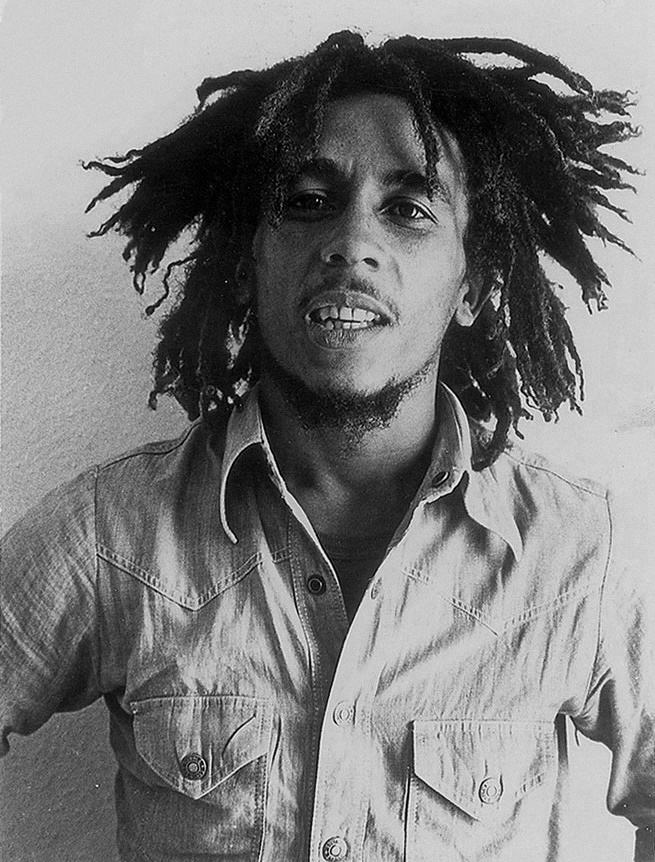
Bob Marley's mother is of African descent and his father is of European ancestry.

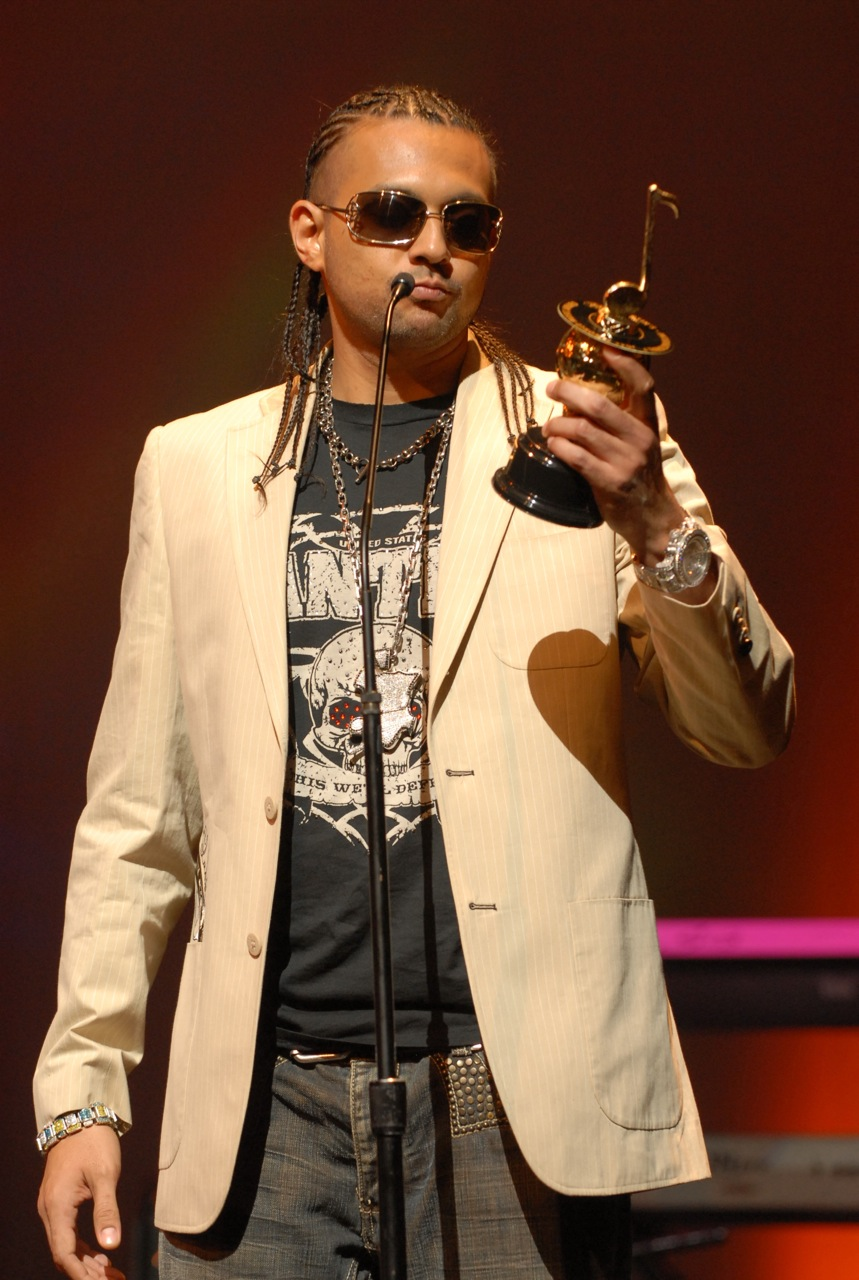
Sean Paul's mother is of English and Chinese Jamaican descent; his paternal grandmother was Afro-Caribbean and his paternal grandfather was a Sephardic Jew from Portugal.

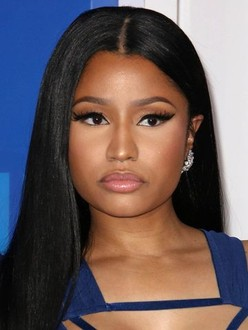
Global artist Nicki Minaj, born to an Dougla-Trinidadian (Afro and Indo mixed) father and Afro-Trinidadian mother.

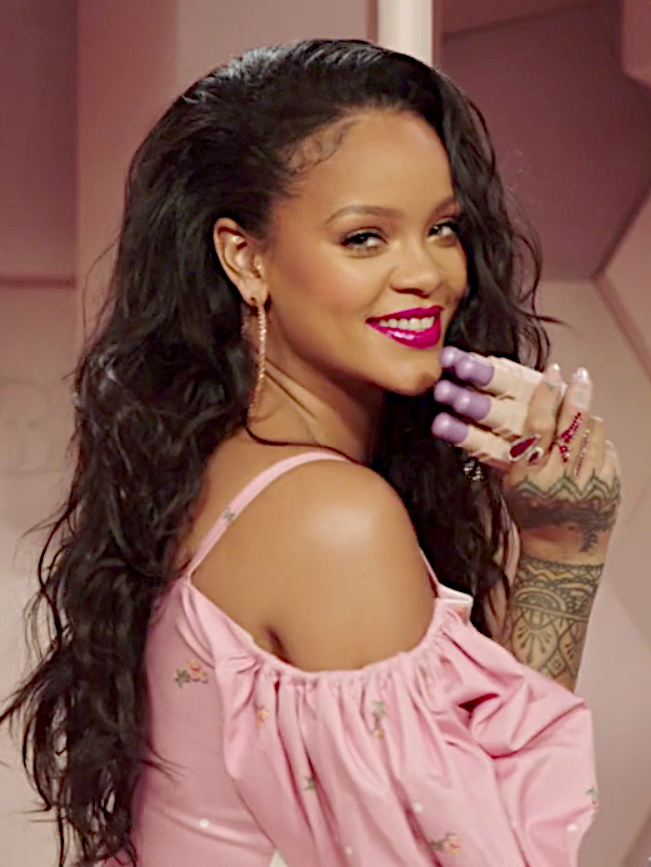
Rihanna, Barbadian singer and businesswoman of Sub-Saharan African, English, Irish and Scottish descent.

Colonialism throughout the West Indies has created diverse populations on many islands and countries, including people of multiracial identities. In the English-speaking Caribbean, individuals of Afro-Caribben and Indo-Caribbean descent – such as those in Trinidad, Guyana, and Suriname – are often called Dougla people which make up 20-30% of these nations. Other groups include Anglo-Indian and Chindian people.

=== Afro-Asians ===
In the 1860s, East Indian and Chinese immigrants arrived in the West Indies as indentured servants. Chinese male laborers and migrants went to Peru, Cuba, Haiti, Guyana, Suriname, Jamaica and Trinidad where they often intermarried with local black women which resulted in a large population of racially mixed children. According to the 1946 Census from Jamaica and Trinidad alone, 12,394 Chinese were located between Jamaica and Trinidad. 5,515 of those who lived in Jamaica were Chinese-Jamaican, also known as "Chinese colored" (Chinese mixed race) and another 3,673 were Chinese-Trinidadians (Chinese colored) living in Trinidad. The Chinese men who married African women in Guyana and Trinidad Tobago were mostly Cantonese, while the Chinese men who married African women in Jamaica were mostly Hakka but with a large minority of Cantonese men. In her book and documentary Finding Samuel Lowe: China, Jamaica, Harlem, Afro-Chinese-Jamaican-American Paula Williams Madison explores her grandfather's life and travels. The journey ends with the reunion of the author's immediate relatives with their newly discovered extended family in Guangdong, China. 1871 the census was recorded at a population of 506,154 people, 246,573 of which were males and 259,581 females. Their races were recorded as 13,101 White people, 100,346 Coloured (mixed Black and White) and 392,707 Black people with a minority making up other races.

In Jamaica, Guyana, Suriname and Trinidad, a percentage of the population of people are of Chinese and Indian descent (from paternal Grandfather), some of whom have contributed to Afro-Asian-Caribbean children.

Approximately 4% of Jamaican men have a direct Chinese paternal ancestor.

=== Antigua and Barbuda ===
Multiracial Antiguans and Barbudans are Antiguans and Barbudans who have mixed ancestry of two or more ethnicities. Multiracial people are composed of two groups: mixed black/white and other mixed. In 2011, there were 786 mixed black/white people and 3,225 other mixed people. Mixed people have lived in Antigua and Barbuda since the introduction of slaves to the archipelago, and in 1787 the Antiguan census began collecting information on the multiracial population. When a mixed identity first emerged preceding emancipation, multiracial people began to be associated with an "intermediate class", being neither white nor enslaved. Mixed people are the largest minority group in the country.

=== Cayman Islands ===
Mixed-Race Caymanians refers to citizens of the Cayman Islands with a multiracial background. The majority of the population is mixed-race, with most being of English and African ancestry, tracing their lineage back to early English and Scottish settlers, as well as enslaved people brought to the islands from Africa. There is also a large number of mixed-race Caymanians of Latin American origin, most notably with ties to Honduras and Cuba. Mixed-race Caymanians of Indian and Filipino descent are also a growing community as the islands have seen a significant increase in South and South-East Asian immigration since the early 2000s.

=== Creole Caribbeans ===
In many parts of the Southern Caribbean, the term Creole people is used to refer to the mixed-race descendants of Europeans and Africans born in the islands. Over time, there was intermarriage with Amerindians and residents from Asia, the Middle East and Latin America as well. They eventually formed a common culture based on their experience of living together in countries colonized by the French, Spanish, Dutch, and British.

A typical Creole person from the Caribbean has French, Spanish, Portuguese, British, Dutch or Jewish ancestry, mixed with sub-Saharan African ethnicities, and sometimes mixed with Indigenous peoples of the Americas. As workers from Asia entered the Caribbean, Creole people of colour intermarried with Arabs, Indians, Chinese, Javanese, Filipinos, Koreans, and Hmongs. The latter combinations were especially common in Guadeloupe. The foods and cultures are the result of creolization of these influences.

=== Guyana ===
In Guyana, Chinese men married Indian women due to the lack of Chinese women in the early days of settlement. Creole relationships and unions between Chinese and Indians were rare in the beginning, though it became less so later on as some Chinese men established relationships and intermarried with Indian women due to the scarcity of Chinese women. There were selective instances where Chinese men took their Indian wives back with them to China. Indian women and children were brought alongside Indian men as coolies while Chinese men made up 99% of Chinese coolies.

There are few accounts of unions and marriages between the Chinese and the Indians in Guyana. An account of the era told by women in British Guiana is of a single Chinese man who was allowed to temporarily borrow a Hindu Indian woman by her Indian husband who was his friend, so the Chinese man could sire a child with her, after a son was born to her the Chinese man kept the boy while she was returned to her Indian husband, the boy was named William Adrian Lee. An Indian woman named Mary See married a Chinese man surnamed Wu in Goedverwagting and founded their own family after he learned how to process sugar cane.

The contrast with the female to male ratio among Indian and Chinese immigrants has been compared by historians.

In Guyana, while marriages between Indian women and black African men is socially shameful to Indians, Chinese-Indian marriages are considered acceptable as reported by Joseph Nevadomsky in 1983. "Chiney-dougla" is the Indian Guyanese term for mixed Chinese-Indian children. Some Indian women in Guyana practiced polyandry within their community due to the extreme shortage of women compared to men.

In British Guiana, the Chinese did not maintain their distinctive physical features due to the high rate of Chinese men marrying people other ethnicities like Indian women. The severe imbalance with Indian men outnumbering Indian women led some women to take advantage of the situation to squeeze favors from men and leave their partners for other men, one infamous example was a pretty, light skinned, Christian Indian woman named Mary Ilandun with ancestral origins from Madras, born in 1846, who had relations with Indian, black, and Chinese men as she married them in succession and ran off with their money to her next paramour, doing this from 1868 to 1884. Indian men used force to bring Indian women back in line from this kind of behavior, such as infamous "wife murders". The most severe lack of women in all the peoples of British Guiana was with the Chinese and this led Europeans to believe that Chinese did not engage in wife murders while wife murders was something innate to Indian men. Chinese women were viewed as more chaste than their Indian counterparts. Chinese women were not indentured and since they did not need to work, they avoided prospective men seeking relationships, while the character of Indian women was disparaged as immoral and their alleged sexual immorality was blamed for their deaths in the "wife murders" by Indian men. The sex ratio of Indian men to Indian women was 100:63 while the sex ratio of Chinese men to Chinese women was 100:43 in British Guiana in 1891.

In British Guiana there was growth of coolie Indian women marriages with Chinese men and it was reported that "It is not an uncommon thing to find a cooly woman living with a Chinaman as his wife, and in one or two instances the woman has accompanied her reputed husband to China." by Dr. Comins in 1891 and an 1892 Immigration British Guiana authorities took note of marriages between Indian women and Chinese men that year.

=== Jamaica ===
According to the most recent study by the University of the West Indies, Jamaica consists of the following ethnic groups, broken down by percentage: 76.3% African, 15.1% Afro-European, 3.4% Indian or Afro-Indian, 3.2% White, 1.2% Chinese or Afro-Chinese and 0.8% Others (2024 est.)

Mixed-race and lighter-skinned "Mulatto" Jamaicans have played a crucial role in shaping the country’s political and economic structures since the colonial era. Their shared experiences, social networks, and cultural practices have distinguished them from the Black majority in meaningful ways.

=== Trinidad ===
Trinidanian Prime Minister Stuart Young was born on Henry Street, Port of Spain, on 9 February 1975 to a Catholic Chinese father, Richard Peter Young, (Chinese Trinidadian), and an Indian Muslim mother, Priscilla Hosein, (Indo-Trinidadian). He was raised Catholic but his mother is Muslim and grew up on Lal Beharry Trace in Debe.

The situation in Trinidad and British Guiana with Indian women being fewer than Indian men led to Indian women using the situation to their advantage by leaving their partners for other men, leading to a high incidence of "wife murders" by Indian men on their wives, and Indian women and culture were branded as "immoral" by European observers, an Indian Muslim man named Mohammad Orfy petitioned as a representative of "destitute Indian men of Trinidad", to the colonial authorities, complaining of Indian women's behavior and claiming that it was "a perforating plague...the high percentage of immoral lives led by the female section of our community...to satisfy the greed and lust of the male section of quite a different race to theirs...[Indian women] are enticed, seduced and frightened into becoming concubines, and paramours...[Indian women] have absolutely no knowledge whatsoever of the value of being in virginhood...most shameless and a perfect menace to the Indian gentry." with him naming specific peoples, claiming that Indian women were having relationships with men of various races, including Chinese, Africans, Americans, and Europeans. Saying "Africans, Americans and Chinese in goodly numbers are enticing the females of India, who are more or less subtle to lustful traps augured through some fear of punishment being meted out if not readily submissive as requested."

The situation on Trinidad enabled unprecedented autonomy in the sexual activities of Hindu and Muslim Indian women and freedom. The 1916 "Peition of Indentured Labourers in Trinidad" complained that: "Is it permissible for a male member of the Christian faith to keep a Hindoo or Muslim female as his paramour or concubine? Is this not an act of sacrilege and a disgraceful scandal according to the Christian faith to entice and encourage Indian females to lead immoral lives?"

There were instances where plantations managers and overseers had intimate relations with indentured woman. According to Attorney General W.F. Haynes Smith, Indian indentured women in marital or civil unions with men of different races, English, Portuguese, and Chinese. Unions between Indian men and Creole women were rare, as the Indian men viewed creole women negatively. Approval of interracial marriage has increased in Trinidad and Tobago and one Chinese man reported that his Indian wife did not encounter any rejection from his parents when asked in a survey. In Trinidad Europeans and Chinese are seen as acceptable marriage partners for Indian women by Indian families while marrying black men would lead to rejection of their daughters by Indian families.

== Europe ==
=== Romani people ===
Romani people are of mixed South Asian, Middle Eastern and European ancestry. They settled in Europe hundreds of years ago.

=== United Kingdom ===
In 1991 an analysis of the census showed that 50% of mixed Caribbean men born in the UK have native British partners. In 2000, The Sunday Times reported that "Britain has the highest rate of interracial relationships in the world" and certainly the UK has the highest rate in the European Union. The 2001 census showed the population of England to be 1.4% mixed-race, compared with 2.7% in Canada and 1.4% in the U.S. (estimate from 2002), although this U.S. figure did not include mixed-race people who had a parent with African Ancestry. Both the US and UK have fewer people identifying as mixed race, however, than Canada. The 2011 BBC documentary Mixed Britannia noted that 1 in 10 British children are growing up in mixed households.

In the United Kingdom, many mixed-race people have Caribbean, African or Asian heritage. For example, supermodel Naomi Campbell has Jamaican, African and Asian roots. Some, like seven time Formula One World Champion Lewis Hamilton, are referred to or describe themselves as 'mixed'.

The 2001 UK Census included a section entitled 'Mixed', to which 1.4% (1.6% by 2005 estimates) of people responded, which was split further into White and Black Caribbean, White and Asian, White and Native African and Other Mixed. In the 2011 census, 2.2% chose 'Mixed' for the question on ethnicity, increasing to 2.9% in 2021.

=== Russia ===
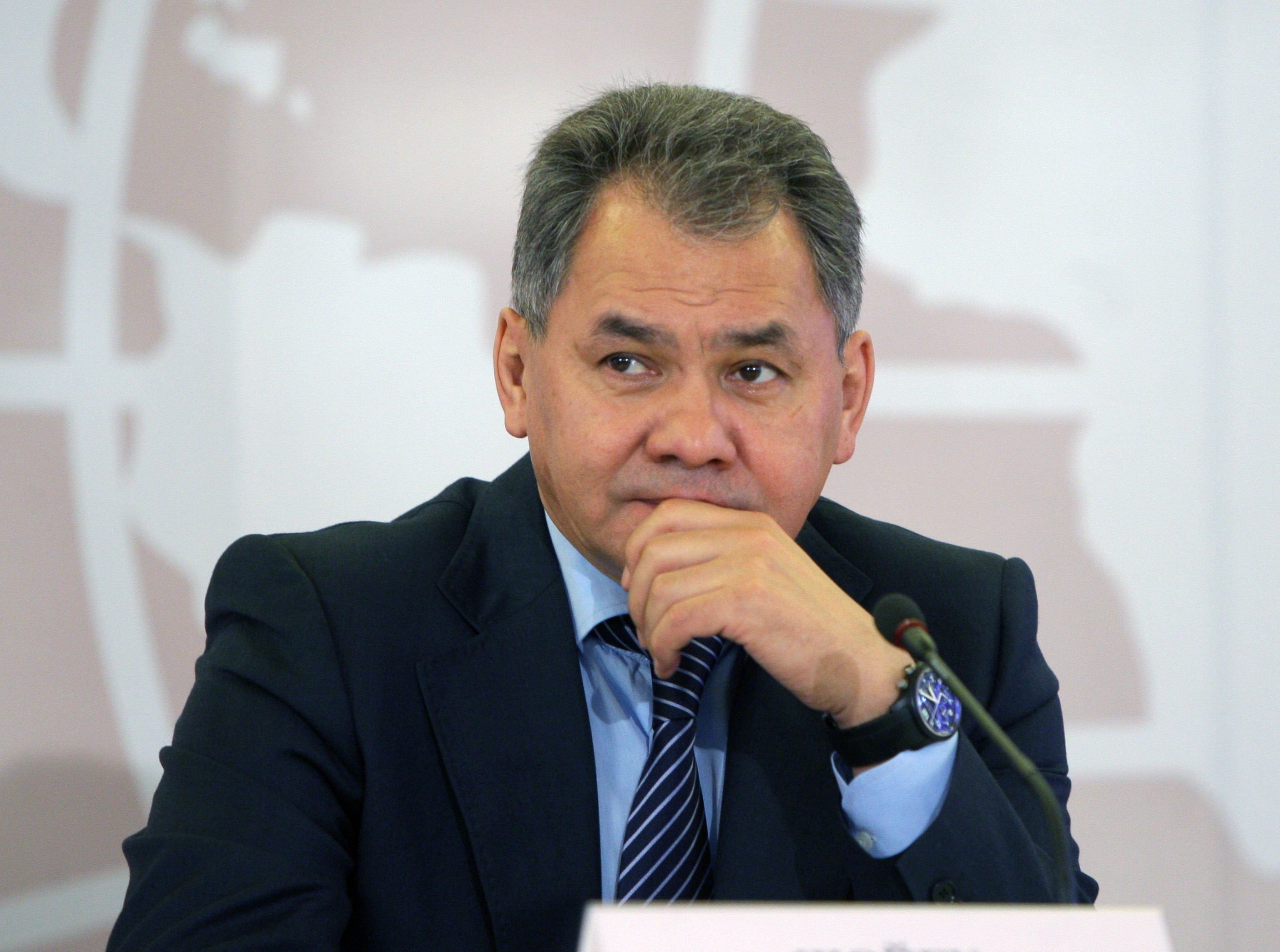
Sergei Shoigu, whose father is Tuvan and mother is Russian, has mixed Siberian Turkic and East Slavic ancestry.

Genetic studies indicate that populations in the Volga–Ural region and parts of Siberia show varying degrees of East Asian and West Eurasian ancestry, reflecting historical gene flow in northern Eurasia involving East Slavic, Turkic, and Uralic-speaking populations in different proportions depending on the region. For example, a mitochondrial DNA study of Volga Tatars found a predominance of West Eurasian maternal lineages (approximately 84%) alongside a smaller East Eurasian component (around 16%), while Y-chromosome data show higher levels of East Eurasian paternal lineages compared to maternal lineages.

== Latin America ==
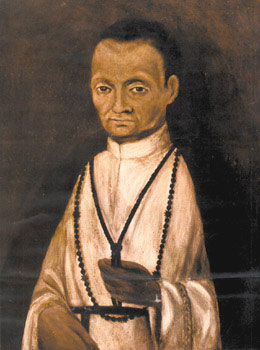
Saint Martín de Porres, Peruvian priest and first Mixed-race Catholic saint, of Spanish father and freed black mother.

"Mestizo" is the common word for mixed-race people in Hispanophone America, especially people with Indigenous and Spanish or other European ancestry. Mestizos make up a large portion of Hispanophone Americans, comprising a majority in many countries.

In Central and South America, racial mixture was officially acknowledged from colonial times. There was official nomenclature for every conceivable mixture present in the various countries. Initially, this classification was used as a type of caste system, where rights and privileges were accorded depending on one's official racial classification. Official caste distinctions were abolished in many countries of the Spanish-speaking Americas as they became independent of Spain. Several terms have remained in common usage.

Race and racial mixture have played a significant role in the politics of many Hispanophone American countries. In most countries, for example Mexico, Colombia, Dominican Republic and Panama, a majority of the population can be described as biracial or mixed race (depending on the country). In Mexico, over 80% of the population is mestizo to some degree.

=== Brazil ===
Proportion of Mixed Brazilians in each department in 2022.

According to the 2022 official census, 45.34% of Brazilians identified themselves as Pardo. This option is normally chosen by people who consider themselves mixed race. The Mixed Race Day (Dia do Mestiço), on 27 June, is an official event in the states of Amazonas, Roraima, and Paraíba and a holiday in two cities. Other than pardo, people who are mixed race also have other names to refer to themselves such as moreno, caboclo, mestiço and mulatto. Those terms are not considered offensive and focus more on skin color than ethnicity (they are seen as comparable to other human characteristics, such as being short or tall).

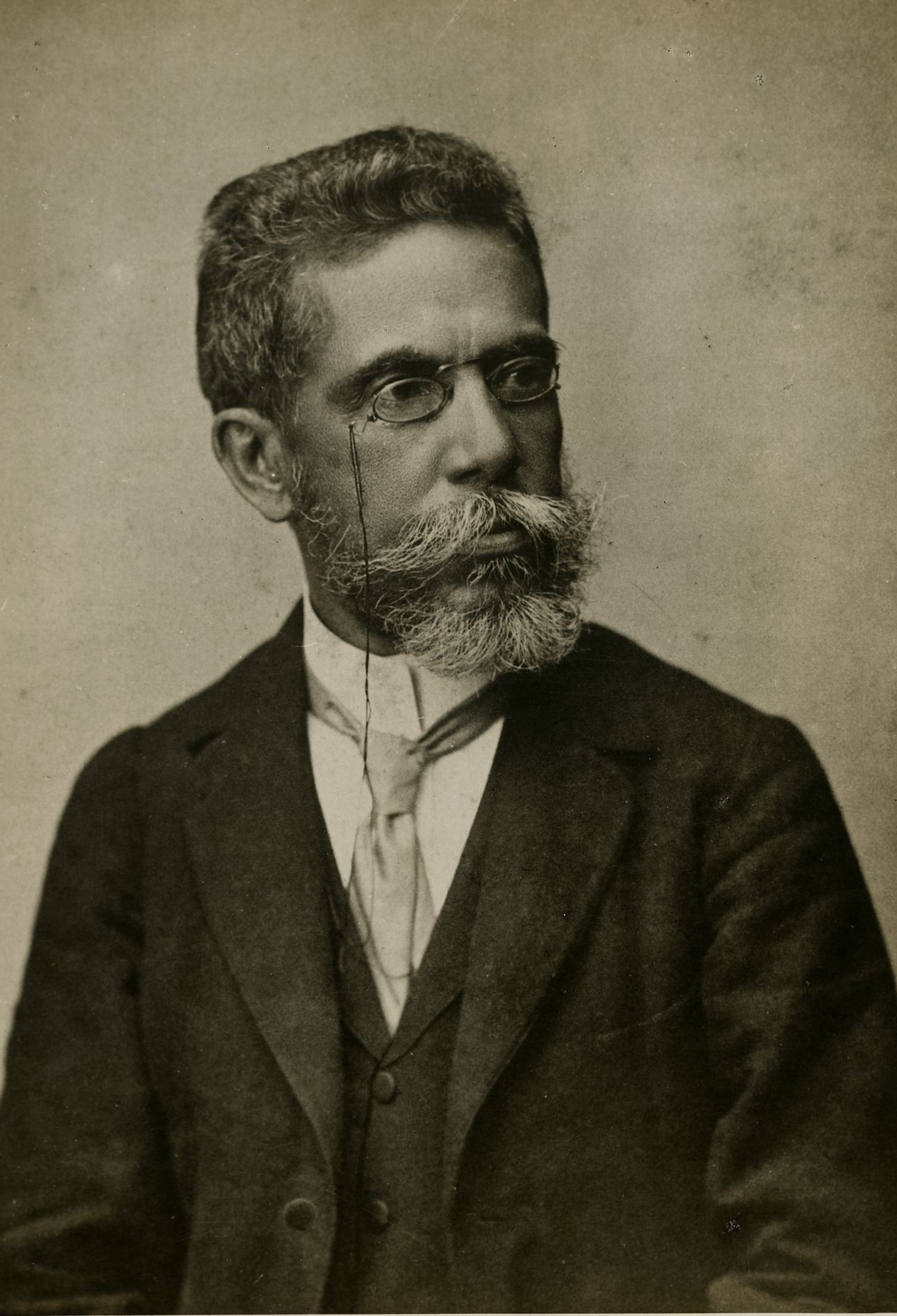
Machado de Assis, Brazilian writer whose father was mulatto and whose mother was Portuguese.

Most Brazilians of mixed race are usually tri-racial, with Amerindian, European, and African origins. Other common mixed-race groups are between European and African (mulatto) and Amerindian and European (caboclo or mameluco). But there are also African and Amerindian (cafuzo) and East Asian (mostly Japanese) and European/other (ainoko or more recently, hāfu). These groups are found throughout the country to varying degrees.

Since mixed-race relations in Brazilian society have occurred for many generations, some people find it difficult to trace their own ethnic ancestry. Today a majority of mixed-race Brazilians do not really know their ethnic ancestry, but they are aware that their ancestors were probably Portuguese, African and Amerindian. Additionally, a very large number of Italians (Brazil has the largest Italian population outside Italy), Japanese (the largest Japanese population outside Japan), Lebanese (the largest Lebanese population outside Lebanon), Germans, Poles, Russians and others contributed to Brazil's racial makeup. A high percentage of Brazilians is also of Jewish descent, perhaps hundreds of thousands, mostly found in the northeast of the country who cannot be sure of their ancestry as they descend from the so-called "Crypto-Jews" (Jews who practiced Judaism in secret but outwardly pretended to be Catholics), also called Marranos or New Christians, often considered Portuguese. According to some sources, one third of families arrived from Portugal during colonization were of Jewish origin.

== North America ==
=== Canada ===
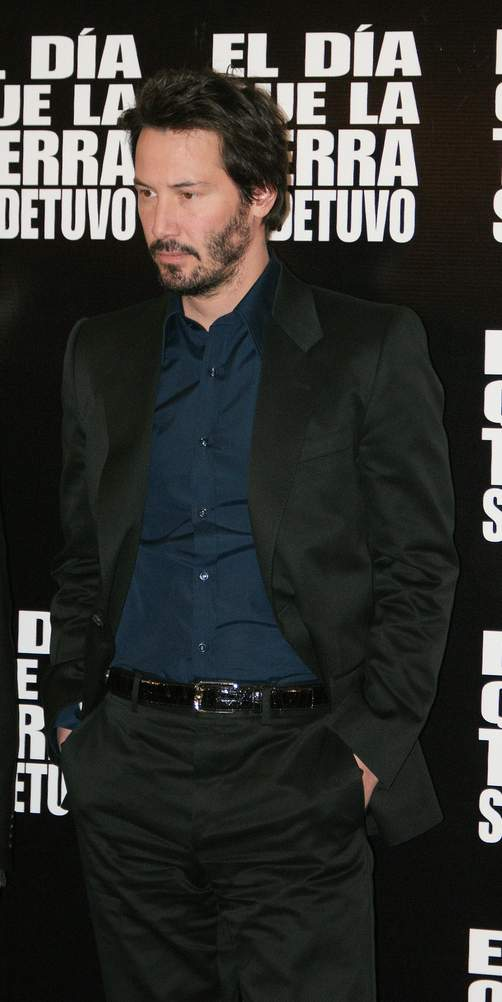
Canadian actor and musician Keanu Reeves is of English, Native Hawaiian, Irish, Portuguese and Chinese descent.

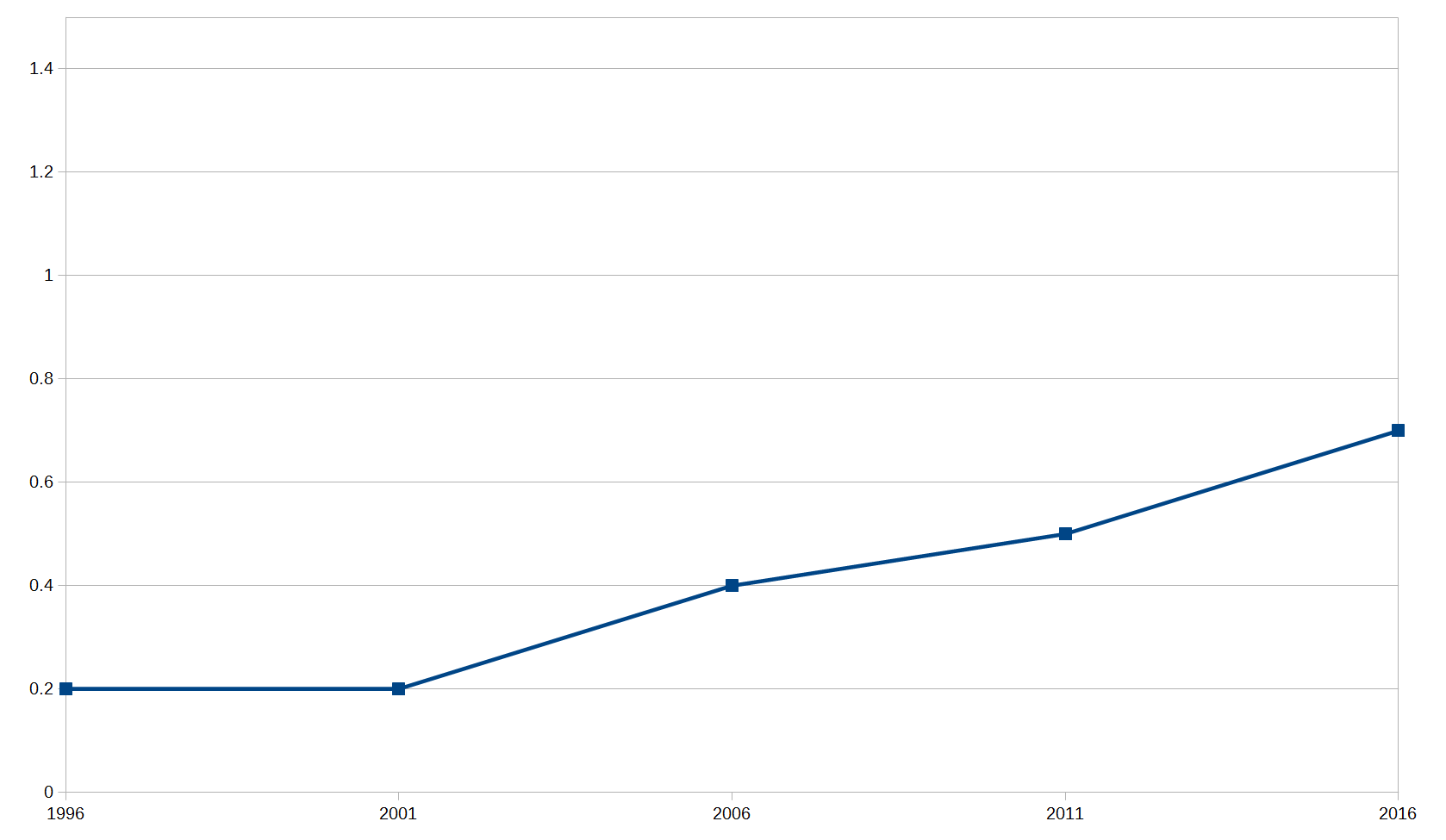
Canada Census Multiple Visible Minority 1996 – 2016

Mixed-race Canadians in 2006 officially totaled 1.5% of the population, up from 1.2% in 2001. The official mixed-race population grew by 25% since the previous census. Of these, the most frequent combinations were multiple visible minorities (for example, people of mixed black and South Asian heritage form the majority, specifically in Toronto), followed closely by white-black, white-Chinese, white-Arab and many other smaller mixes. Another 1.2% of Canadians officially are Métis (descendants of a historical population who were partially Indigenous and European, particularly English, Scottish, Irish and French ethnic groups). Although the term "Métis" stems from the Latin verb miscēre, "to mix", the Métis people are a distinct ethnic group within Canada.

During the time of slavery in the United States, a very large but unknown number of African slaves escaped to Canada, where slavery was made illegal in 1834, via the Underground Railroad. Many of these people married in with European Canadian and Native Canadian populations, although their precise numbers and the numbers of their descendants are not known.

During the Pemmican War trials that began in 1818 in Montreal regarding the destruction of the Selkirk Settlement on the Red River the terms Half-Breeds, Bois-Brulés, Brulés, and Métifs were defined as "Persons descended from Indian women by white men, and in these trials applied chiefly to those employed by the North-West Company". The Canadian government also used the term half-breed in the late 19th and early 20th century for people who were of mixed Indigenous and European ancestry. The North-West Half-Breed Commission established by the Canadian government after the North-West Rebellion also used the term to refer to the Métis residents of the North-West Territories. In 1885, children born in the North-West of Métis parents or "pure Indian and white parents" were defined as half-breeds by the commission and were eligible for "Half-breed" Scrip.

In Alberta the Métis formed the "Halfbreed Association of Northern Alberta" in 1932.

=== United States ===
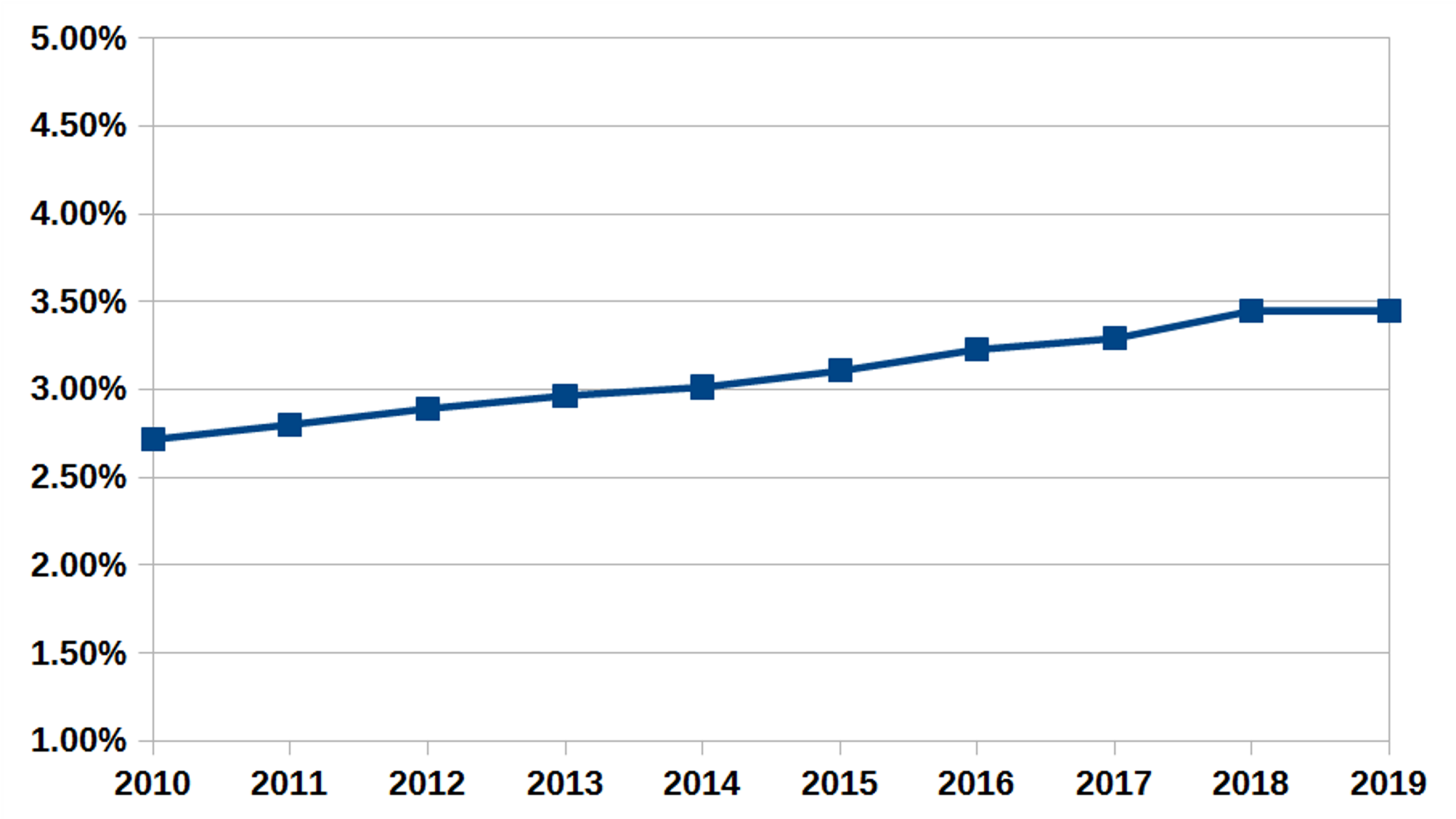
US Census reporting of Two or Mixed Races 2010 – 2019

The United States is one of the most racially diverse countries in the world. Americans are mostly mixed ethnic descendants of various immigrant nationalities culturally distinct in their former countries. Cultural assimilation and racial integration took place unevenly across different historical periods, depending on the American region. The "Americanization" of foreign ethnic groups and the inter-racial diversity of Americans has been a fundamental part of its history, especially on frontiers where different groups of people came together.

The 2000 census was the first in the history of the country to offer respondents the option of identifying as more than one race. This mixed-race option was considered a necessary adaptation to the demographic and cultural changes that the United States has been undergoing. Mixed-race Americans officially numbered 6.1 million in 2006, or 2.0% of the population. There is considerable evidence that an accurate number would be much higher. Prior to the mid-20th century, many people hid their mixed-race heritage. The development of binary thinking about race meant that African Americans, a high proportion of whom have also had European ancestry, were classified as black. Some are now reclaiming additional ancestries. Some Americans may be multiracial without being aware of it. The US has a growing mixed-race identity movement. Interracial marriage, most notably between whites and blacks, was historically deemed immoral and illegal in most states in the 18th, 19th and first half of the 20th century. California and the Western United States had similar laws to prohibit European-Asian marriages, which were associated with discrimination against Chinese and Japanese on the West Coast. Many states eventually repealed such laws and a 1967 decision by the US Supreme Court (Loving v. Virginia) overturned all remaining US anti-miscegenation laws.

According to the Census Bureau, as of 2002, 75% of all African Americans had mixed ancestries, usually European and Native American. In 2010, the number of Americans who checked both "black" and "white" on their census forms was 134 percent higher than it had been a decade earlier. In 2012, those choosing 'Two or more races' on the census were 2.4% of the total. According to James P. Allen and Eugene Turner, by some calculations in the 2000 Census, the mixed-race population that is part white is as follows:

- White/Native American and Alaskan Native: 7,015,017
- White/African American: 737,492
- White/Asian: 727,197 and
- White/Native Hawaiian and other Pacific Islander: 125,628.

Barack Obama, the first mixed-race President of the United States

On January 20, 2009, Barack Obama was sworn in as the first mixed-race president of the United States, as he is the son of a European American mother of mostly English descent and a Luo father from Kenya. He acknowledges both parents. His official White House biography describes him as African American. In Hawaiʻi, the U.S. state in which he was born, he would be called "hapa", a Hawaiian word meaning "mixed race".

==== Mixed-blood ====
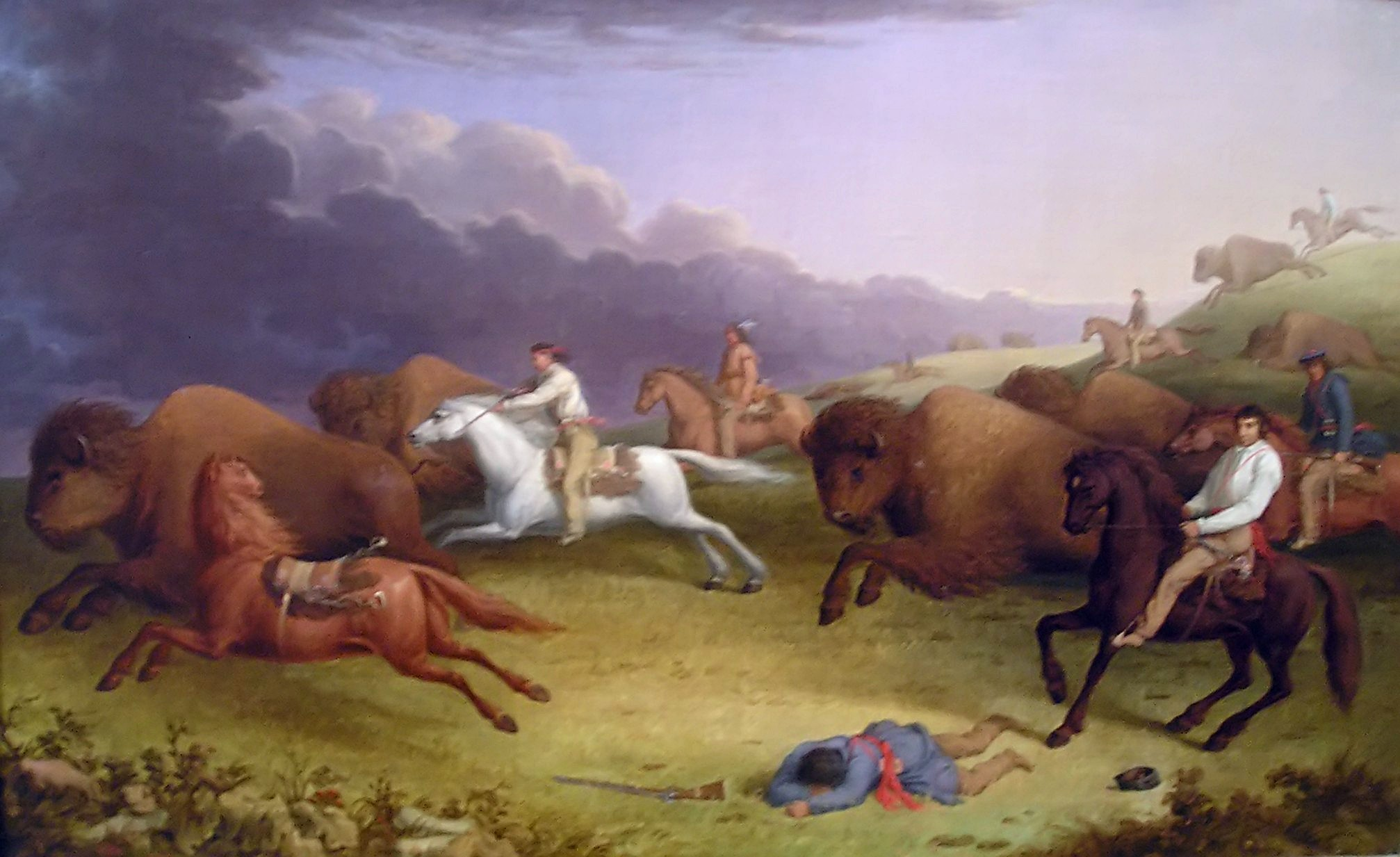
Paul Kane's oil painting Half-Breeds Running Buffalo depicts a Métis buffalo hunt on the prairies of Dakota in June 1846.

In the United States, the terms mixed blood and half-breed have often historically referred to half Native American and half European/White people. The term half-breed in particular is considered obsolete, but appeared in historic legislation affecting multiracial people.

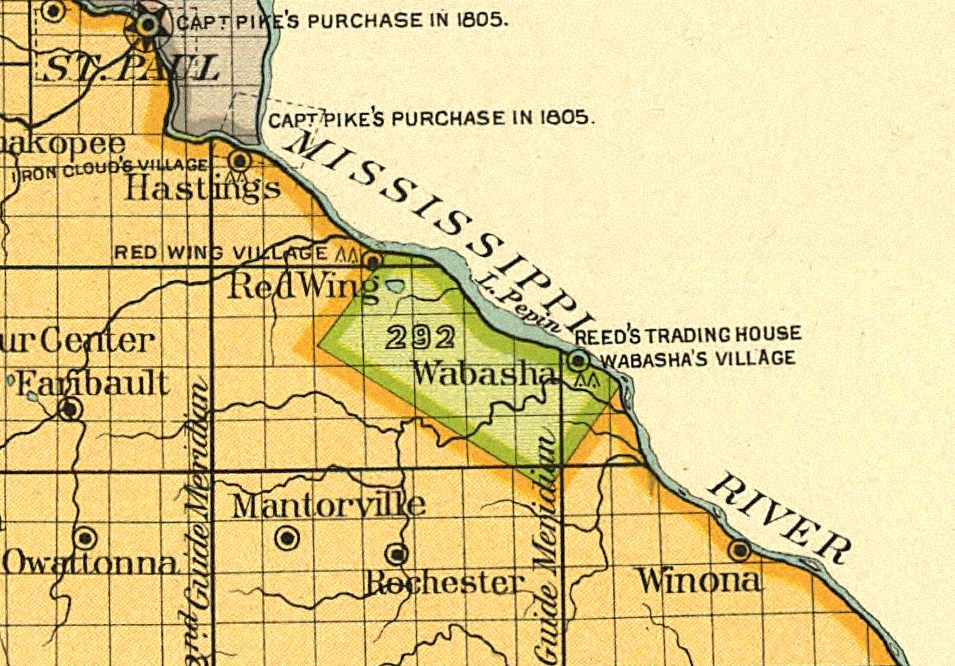
The Minnesota side of the Lake Pepin Half-Breed Tract is designated as 292 on this map.

In the 19th century, the United States government set aside lands in the western states for people of Native American and European ancestry known as the Half-Breed Tract. The Nemaha Half-Breed Reservation was established by the Treaty of Prairie du Chien of 1830. In Article 4 of the 1823 Treaty of Fond du Lac, land was granted to the "half-breeds" of Chippewa descent on the islands and shore of St. Mary's River near Sault Ste. Marie. Unusually for its time, under the 1850 Donation Land Claim Act, "half-breed Indians" were eligible for land grants in the Oregon Territory, as were married white women.

Renowned persons of mixed-blood ancestry include Jean Baptiste Charbonneau, who guided the Mormon Battalion from New Mexico to the city of San Diego in California in 1846 and then accepted an appointment there as alcalde of Mission San Luis Rey. Both his parents worked with the Lewis and Clark Expedition, his mother Sacagawea as the invaluable Shoshone guide and his French-Canadian father Toussaint Charbonneau as an interpreter of Shoshone and Hidatsa, cook and laborer. J.B. Charbonneau is depicted on the United States dollar coin along with his mother Sacagawea.

Another example is Jane Johnston Schoolcraft, inducted into the Michigan Women's Hall of Fame in 2008, in recognition of her literary contributions. She is recognized as the first Native American literary writer and poet, and the first Native American poet to write in an indigenous language. Jane Johnston was the daughter of a wealthy Scots-Irish fur trader and his Ojibwe wife, who was daughter of an Ojibwe chief. Johnston Schoolcraft was born in 1800 and lived most of her life in Sault Ste. Marie, Michigan, where she grew up in both cultures and learned French, English and Ojibwe, writing in both of the latter two languages. She married Henry Rowe Schoolcraft, who became a renowned ethnographer, in part due to her and her family's introduction to Native American culture. A major collection of her writings was published in 2007.

== Oceania ==
=== Fiji ===
Fiji has long been a multi-ethnic country, with a vast majority of people being mixed race even if they do not self-identify in that manner. The indigenous Fijians are of mixed Melanesian and Polynesian ancestry, resulting from years of migration of islanders from various places mixing with each other. Fiji Islanders from the Lau group have intermarried with Tongans and other Polynesians over the years. The overwhelming majority of the rest of the indigenous Fijians, though, can be genetically traced to having mixed Polynesian/Melanesian ancestry.

The Indo-Fijian population is also a hodge-podge of South Asian immigrants (called Girmits in Fiji), who came as indentured labourers beginning in 1879. While a few of these labourers managed to bring wives, many of them either took or were given wives once they arrived in Fiji. The Girmits, who are classified as simply "Indians" to this day, came from many parts of the Indian subcontinent of present-day India, Pakistan and to a lesser degree Bangladesh and Myanmar. It is easy to recognize the Indian mixtures present in Fiji and see obvious traces of Southern and Northern Indians and other groups who have been categorised together. More of this phenomenon would have likely happened if the religious groups represented (primarily Hindu, Muslim and Sikh) had not resisted to some degree marriage between religious groups, which tended to be from more similar parts of the Indian subcontinent.

Over the years, particularly in the sugar cane-growing regions of Western Viti Levu and parts of Vanua Levu, Indo-Fijians and Indigenous Fijians have mixed. Others have Chinese/Fijian ancestry, Indo-Fijian/Samoan or Rotuman ancestry and European/Fijian ancestry (often called "part Fijians"). The latter are often descendants of shipwrecked sailors and settlers who came during the colonial period. Migration from a dozen or more different Pacific countries (Tuvalu, Solomon Islands, Vanuatu, Samoa and Wallis and Futuna being the most prevalent) have added to the various ethnicities and intermarriages.

=== New Zealand ===
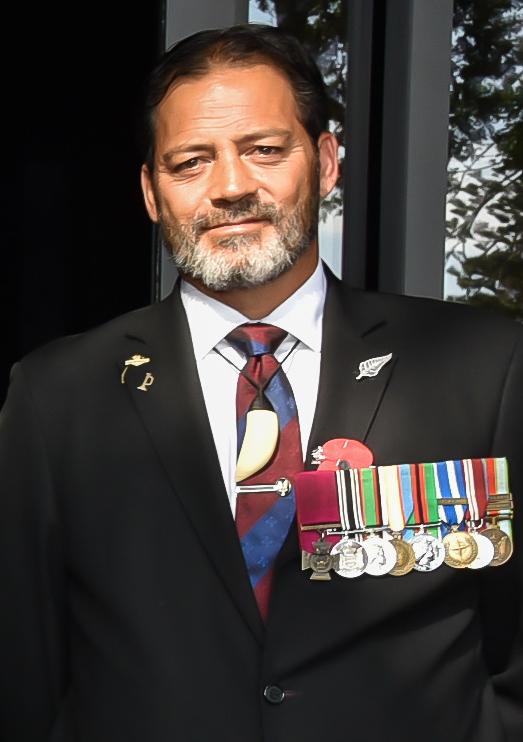
Willie Apiata, the first and currently only recipient of Victoria Cross for New Zealand, is the son of European and Māori New Zealanders.

Ethnic intermarriage has historically been viewed with tolerance in New Zealand. According to a 2006 study, Māori have on average roughly 43% European ancestry, and rates are rising. However, the notion of being "mixed-race" has always been uncommon. An informal one-drop rule is often used for Māori; most Māori believe any degree of Māori ancestry is enough to identify as Māori.

=== Melanesia, Micronesia and Polynesia ===
Euronesian is an umbrella term and portmanteau for people of mixed European and either Melanesian, Micronesian, or Polynesian descent. The term is most commonly used in Samoa. British or French colonizers, missionaries and traders, as well as some descendants of Polynesians and Spaniards in Easter Island (where Chilean law and generic Chilean social views name them mestizos), and descendants of Micronesians and Spaniards in the Caroline Islands (the Federated States of Micronesia and Palau), the Mariana Islands (Guam and the Northern Mariana Islands), and the Marshall Islands. ʻAfakasi is the common term of reference for Euronesians in Samoa; in Fiji, the term Kailoma is usually used.

Distinct Euronesian groups include the Hawaiian Hapa haole, Norfolk Islanders, Bonin Islanders, Palmerston Islanders, Pitcairn Islanders, and Tahitian demis.

== See also ==
- Hyphenated ethnicity
- Melting pot
- Mestizo
- Métis people
- Multiethnic society
- One-drop rule
- Passing (racial identity)
- Plaçage
- Race and society
