= Cinema of Jamaica =

Despite Jamaica never having a very strong film industry, the island has produced notable films from the 1970s onwards. The most critically acclaimed film is The Harder They Come (1972), by Perry Henzell, which received international acclaim. The Jamaican government and various private citizens have tried to promote the creation of new films by the creation of certain agencies such as the Jamaican Film Commission, and film festivals such as the Reggae Film Festival. The Harder They Come sparked trends that were apparent in following films such as Dancehall Queen and One Love, both directed by Don Letts and Rick Elgood.

== History ==
The Motion Picture (Encouragement) Act was passed in 1948. This act aimed to change the tax code so that the economic burden was reduced for state sanctioned production companies. The Jamaican Film Commission was created by the Jamaican government in 1984 to promote investment, export, and employment in the film industry in Jamaica. It serves as the link between private interests and the government. It spends much of its time handling and processing requests from foreign film companies, as well as assisting local companies that usually produce smaller scale productions. The JFC also markets Jamaica as a filming location to foreign companies and assists companies in finding investments in their film. The current Film Commissioner is Jackie Jacqueline Jackson. In 2014 the original Motion Picture (Encouragement) Act was repealed and replaced by the Omnibus Incentive Regime.

In 2017, India expressed interest in helping Jamaican develop its film industry. On March 28, High Commissioner to Jamaica from India, Shri Sevala Naik, expressed favorability to the idea that India could offer assistance to Jamaica through scholarships and internships to drama schools in India.

== Local film production in Jamaica ==
=== Notable Films ===
Perry Henzel's 1972 The Harder They Come is the most internationally recognized Jamaican film. The movie was helped by the wave of recognition that the general culture of Reggae music and Rastafari were receiving at the time. Despite the movie's accolades however, it could not compare to many Hollywood blockbusters in terms of revenue and was part of the ongoing process of investors becoming increasingly resistant to funding Jamaican produced films. Finance is one of the largest barriers to the growth of the industry as it is relatively expensive to produce a film and investors have shied away from funding. In the past however there was more support to produce films in Jamaica by investors as The Harder They Come received international praise and the genre of reggae and dancehall were beginning to be recognized throughout the world.

- The Harder They Come
- One Love
- Countryman
- Smile Orange
- Glory to Gloriana

==== Influence of The Harder They Come ====
Directors in Jamaica have often emulated many of the aspects of The Harder They Come. The movies that succeeded it began a distinct culture in Jamaican cinema based in realism and music as a central focus. Examples can be seen in works such as Third World Cop, Rockers, and Dancehall Queen. The Harder They Come also began a trend in regard to how Jamaican cinema approaches Christianity and Rastafari. Movies following The Harder They Come continued to treat Christianity as a negative force and exalt Rastafari. Movies which are prominent examples of this are One Love and Countryman. Both movies are laudatory and deferential to Rastafari while not presenting any counterargument or faults in the religion.

== Foreign film productions in Jamaica ==
Despite the small size of the film industry, Jamaica has been home to a host many films of historical significance, such as first Black American production to be filmed on site, The Devil's Daughter (1939). These foreign productions have been a source of much capital for the island nation. Club Paradise brought in 53 million dollars to the country. Jamaica has become a popular filming location due to its proximity to Florida and landscape.

=== Notable films ===
Currently there are numerous difficulties with attracting people to the island to film. There is some criticism of the government for not implementing tax friendly policies for foreign companies. For American production companies, the lack of tax incentives compared to other places around the Caribbean and the world pushes these companies to other areas around the world.

- 20,000 Leagues Under the Sea
- Papillon
- Live and Let Die
- Club Paradise
- Treasure Island
- Popcorn
- How Stella Got Her Groove Back

== Film festivals ==
=== Reggae Film Festival ===
Reminiscing on the success of The Harder They Come, the Reggae Film Festival was started in 2008 in Emancipation Park, New Kingston, and seeks to encourage the same success by hosting a film festival annually. People from Jamaica and other countries can bring their films to the festival which lasts for three days. On the last day six people with notable productions are inducted as the first executive directors of a Jamaican film. The current director is Barbara Blake Hannah, who is also the current executive director of the Jamaican film industry.

=== Flashpoint Film Festival ===
Seeking to encourage the creation of new films after movies, Paul Bucknor, Greer Ann, and Bertam Sam created the Flashpoint Film Festival in 2004. The Flashpoint Film Festival started in The Caves, a hotel located in Negril, Jamaica. The festival allows for directors to come together and display their films for the locals. As the advent of digital cameras drastically reduce the cost of creating a film, the aim of the film festival is to help develop a film industry within the Caribbean by uniting filmmakers old and new with an international audience.

In 2008, the Flashpoint Film Festival was moved to Port Royal in hopes of attracting residents from Kingston to festival.

In 2008, a rough cut of Better Mus Come premiered during the Festival.
