= Dahlia Harris =

- Born: Spanish Town, Jamaica
- Occupations: Actress, television personality, public speaker
- Years active: 2005 – present
- Television: Smile Jamaica

Dahlia Harris is a Jamaican actress, television and radio personality, public speaker, and film and theatre director.

== Biography ==
The daughter of Enid and Cyril Harris, Dahlia Harris was born and grew up with her four siblings in Spanish Town, Saint Catherine Parish in Jamaica. She started her acting career in 2005, and has appeared in many television series, and television films. She is a co-host for Television Jamaica's programme Smile Jamaica and also cohosts the radio program Two Live Crew on Radio Jamaica. She was crowned Miss Jamaica Festival Queen in 1990.

== Filmography ==
| Year | Film | Role |
|---|---|---|
| 2011 | Country Duppy | Clara |
| 2015 | Ol' Fyah Stick | Margaret |
| 2016 | Ring Games | Margaret |
