= Eye On Sports =

Eye on Sports may refer to:

- A sports talk program on Television Jamaica
- A sports anthology series on CBS, also known as CBS Sports Spectacular.
