= 2007 New Zealand gallantry awards =

Awards list for New Zealand

The 2007 New Zealand gallantry awards were announced via a Special Honours List on 2 July 2007, and recognised four New Zealand military personnel for actions while serving in Afghanistan in 2004. The identities of three of the four award recipients were not released for operational security reasons. Willie Apiata was awarded the Victoria Cross for New Zealand, the first and so far only time the decoration has been awarded since its inception in 1999.

== Victoria Cross for New Zealand (VC) ==
- Corporal Bill Henry Apiata – 1st New Zealand Special Air Service Group

Lance Corporal (now Corporal) Apiata was, in 2004, part of a New Zealand Special Air Service (NZSAS) Troop on patrol in Afghanistan, which laid up in defensive formation for the night. At approximately 0315 hours, the Troop was attacked by a group of about twenty enemy fighters, who had approached by stealth using the cover of undulating ground in pitch darkness. Rocket-propelled grenades struck two of the Troop’s vehicles, destroying one and immobilising the other. The opening strike was followed by dense and persistent machine gun and automatic rifle fire from close range. The attack then continued using further rocket-propelled grenades and machine gun and rifle fire. The initial attack was directed at the vehicle where Lance Corporal Apiata was stationed. He was blown off the bonnet by the impact of rocket propelled grenades striking the vehicle. He was dazed, but was not physically injured. The two other vehicle crew members had been wounded by shrapnel; one of them; Corporal A, was in a serious condition. Illuminated by the burning vehicle, and under sustained and accurate enemy fire directed at and around their position, the three soldiers immediately took what little cover was available. Corporal A was discovered to have sustained life-threatening wounds. The other two soldiers immediately began applying basic first aid. Lance Corporal Apiata assumed command of the situation, as he could see that his superior’s condition was deteriorating rapidly.

By this time, however, Lance Corporal Apiata’s exposed position, some seventy metres in front of the rest of the Troop, was coming under increasingly intense enemy fire. Corporal A was now suffering serious arterial bleeding and was lapsing in and out of consciousness.

Lance Corporal Apiata concluded that his comrade urgently required medical attention, or he would likely die. Pinned down by the enemy, in the direct line of fire between friend and foe, he also judged that there was almost no chance of such help reaching their position. As the enemy pressed its attack towards Lance Corporal Apiata’s position, and without thought of abandoning his colleague to save himself, he took a decision in the highest order of personal courage under fire. Knowing the risks involved in moving to open ground, Lance Corporal Apiata decided to carry Corporal A single-handedly to the relative safety of the main Troop position, which afforded better cover and where medical treatment could be given. He ordered his other colleague, Trooper T to make his own way back to the rear.

In total disregard of his own safety, Lance Corporal Apiata stood up and lifted his comrade bodily. He then carried him across the seventy metres of broken, rocky and fire swept ground, fully exposed in the glare of battle to heavy enemy fire and into the face of returning fire from the main Troop position. That neither he nor his colleague were hit is scarcely possible. Having delivered his wounded companion to relative shelter with the remainder of the patrol, Lance Corporal Apiata re-armed himself and rejoined the fight in counter-attack. By his actions, he removed the tactical complications of Corporal A's predicament from considerations of rescue.

The Troop could now concentrate entirely on prevailing in the battle itself. After an engagement lasting approximately twenty minutes, the assault was broken up and the numerically superior attackers were routed with significant casualties, with the Troop in pursuit. Lance Corporal Apiata had thereby contributed materially to the operational success of the engagement. A subsequent medical assessment confirmed that Corporal A would probably have died of blood loss and shock, had it not been for Lance Corporal Apiata’s selflessly courageous act in carrying him back to the main Troop lines, to receive the immediate treatment that he needed.

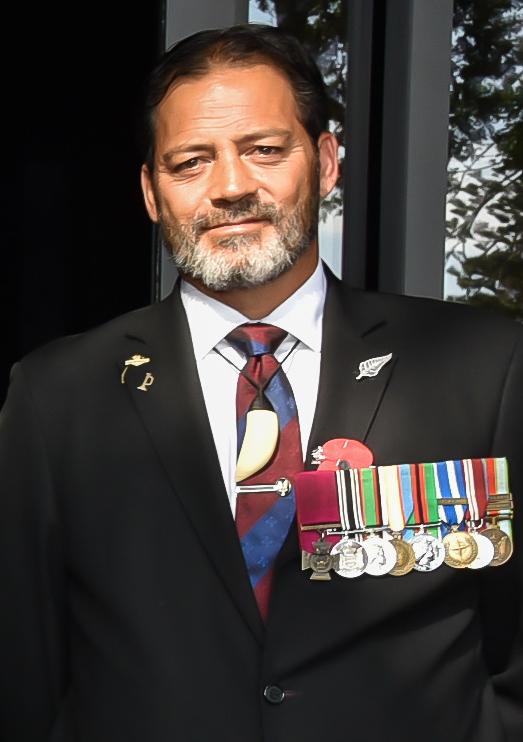
Willie Apiata

== New Zealand Gallantry Decoration (NZGD) ==
- Captain C – 1st New Zealand Special Air Service Group

For an exceptional act of gallantry and leadership under heavy fire and his leadership in general throughout the tour of operations.

- Corporal B – 1st New Zealand Special Air Service Group

For displaying outstanding courage and leadership and accepting extraordinary risks during his tour of operations.

== New Zealand Gallantry Medal (NZGM) ==
- Corporal R – 1st New Zealand Special Air Service Group

For gallantry and the application of firm and timely leadership under extreme combat conditions.
