= Ring Games =

2016 Jamaican television series

- Genre: Soap opera Drama; Romantic teledrama
- Created by: Dahlia Harris
- Written by: Dahlia Harris
- Directed by: Dahlia Harris
- Starring: Dahlia Harris; Volier Johnson; Deon Silvera; Desmond Dennis; Rosie Murray
- Country of origin: Jamaica
- Original languages: English; Jamaican Patois

Production
- Production company: DMH Productions/Television Jama ica

Original release
- Network: Television Jamaica

Ring Games is a Jamaican television series, created in 2016. It revolves around a wealthy family living in Kingston, Jamaica. Created by Television Jamaica, it is written by Dahlia Harris. The series is based on Ol' Fyah Stick, but with a more developed plot.

== Premise ==
Season one of Ring Games finds Joseph Moore (Volier Johnson), a widower of 15 years, hoping to find marital bliss a second time around. His choice of companion is his domestic helper Betty (Deon Silvera), with whom he has been secretly carrying on for years. In order to make it down the aisle, Joseph needs to be honest with his daughter, Margaret (Dahlia Harris), but deep down, he knows that coming clean may permanently damage their relationship.

Throw in the meddlesome security guard, Delroy (Desmond Dennis), who has his sights set on Betty, and the diabolical neighbour, Joan (Rosie Murray), who is hell-bent on destroying the union, and the games begin.

Betty is as determined to get that ring as Margaret and Joan are to get rid of her. Joseph is smack dab in the middle, trying to hold them at bay while trying to keep Delroy away. An intriguing drama with large servings of comedy

== Cast ==
Actor	Character	Role
Dahlia Harris	Margaret	The daughter of Joseph Moore who is determined to stop the romantic relationship between Betty and Joseph.
Volier Johnson	Joseph Moore	Lead male role and Betty's fiancé.
Deon Silvera	Betty	Joseph's teenage sweetheart, eventual helper and now fiancé.
Desmond Dennis	Delroy	Security guard for Joseph's townhouse complex who has a crush on Betty
Rosie Murray	Joan	Joseph's inquisitive neighbor, who has a crush on Joseph, and plans to stop his relationship with Betty

== See also ==
- List of Jamaican films
