= Kingston Paradise =

- Film poster
- Directed by: Mary Wells
- Written by: Mary Wells
- Produced by: Mary Wells; Frances-Anne Solomon
- Starring: Christopher Daley; Camille Small; Gregory Nelson
- Cinematography: Quarry Bastfield
- Edited by: Dominique Naipaul co-exec prod = Caribbean Creativitiy
- Music by: John Welsman
- Production company: CaribbeanTalesFlix (Production Co.) web
- Distributed by: California Pictures & CaribbeanTales Worldwide Distribution Inc.
- Release dates: September 13, 2013 (Toronto); September 24, 2013 (Trinidad and Tobago); February 14, 2014 (Los Angeles)
- Running time: 83 minutes
- Country: Jamaica
- Languages: Jamaican Patois; English
- Budget: US$250,000

Kingston Paradise is a 2013 Jamaican feature-length film written and directed by Mary Wells, featuring Jamaican entertainer Christopher 'Johnny' Daley in a leading role.

== Synopsis ==
Life on the streets of Kingston, Jamaica is about frantic survival for small-time hustler Rocksy (Christopher Daley), a taxi driver/part-time pimp, and Rosie (Camille Small); a prostitute, his roommate and business investment. They dream of another life with a future. On the peeling walls of their tenement, Rosie prominently places a painting of an exotic beach that gives them both hope and something tangible to cling to.

In order to achieve their goal of leaving Kingston for another life, Rocksy devises a risky plan with his friend Malt (Greggory Nelson), to steal and fence a sports car belonging to a local Lebanese businessman Faris (Paul Shoucair).

When Rosie leaves, Rocksy struggles to manage without her, he becomes even more desperate and he does the unthinkable. Something within him has changed, but does the political environment in Jamaica allow for change?

== Cast ==
·Christopher ‘Johnny’ Daley as Rocksy
·Camille Small as Rosie
·Greggory Nelson as Malt
·Paul Shoucair as Faris

== Production and release ==
Kingston Paradise is the first feature by the well-noted Jamaican filmmaker Mary Wells who also produced the film. The film was produced by CaribbeanTalesFlix, along with sales representative California Pictures, who took the title to 2014's Cannes Film Market.

Kingston Paradise had a September 2013 premiere at Toronto's CaribbeanTales Film Festival, where it won the Audience Award for Best Feature. The film also won the Festival Programmer's Award for Narrative Feature at the Pan African Film Festival in 2014; and Best Diaspora Film at the 2014 Africa Movie Academy Awards.

== See also ==
- List of Jamaican films
