= Trevor Rhone =

Jamaican actor, playwright and filmmaker (1940–2009)

Trevor Rhone CD
- Born: Trevor Dave Rhone; 24 March 1940; Kingston, Colony of Jamaica, British Empire
- Died: 15 September 2009 (aged 69); Kingston, Jamaica
- Education: St Jago High School; Rose Bruford College
- Occupations: Playwright and writer
- Years active: c. 1960–2009
- Known for: The Harder They Come (1972), Smile Orange (1974), Old Story Time (1981), One Love (2003)
- Children: 3
- Awards: Commander of the Order of Distinction, Jamaica; Doctor Bird Award; Fellow of Rose Bruford College
- Website: www.trevorrhone.com

Trevor Dave Rhone CD (24 March 1940 – 15 September 2009) was a Jamaican writer, playwright and filmmaker. He co-wrote, with director Perry Henzell, the internationally successful film The Harder They Come (1972).

== Life ==
Trevor Rhone, the last child of 23, was born in Kingston, Jamaica, and grew up in the tiny town of Bellas Gate in Saint Catherine. After seeing his first play at the age of nine, he fell in love with theatre. Educated at Beckford & Smith High School, now known as St. Jago High School, he began his theatre career as a teacher after a three-year stint at Rose Bruford College, an English drama school, where he studied in the early 1960s on scholarship. He was part of the renaissance of Jamaican theatre in the early 1970s. Rhone participated in a group called Theatre '77, which established The Barn, a small theatre in Kingston, to stage local performances. The vision of the group that came together in 1965 was that in 12 years, by 1977, there would be professional theatre in Jamaica.

Rhone's prolific work includes the films The Harder They Come (1972), co-author; Smile Orange (1974), based on his play of the same name; Top Rankin'; Milk and Honey (1988), Genie Award winner; One Love (2003), Cannes Film Festival favorite.

He was awarded the Musgrave Gold Medal in 1999 for his work by the Institute of Jamaica.

He married Camilla King in 1974, and his children are Jonathan Rhone, filmmaker Traci Rhone, and physicist Trevor David Rhone.

== Death ==
Trevor D. Rhone died on 15 September 2009 of a massive heart attack, and was buried in Bellas Gate, St. Catherine, Jamaica.

== Works ==
=== Publications of plays ===
- It's Not My Fault Baby (1967), co-author
- The Gadget (1968)
- Cinderella (1969), musical
- Music Boy (1971)
- Sleeper (1972)
- Comic Strip (1973)
- Everyman (1980)
- Old Story Time (1981), 2010 Longman edition includes CSEC-specific study notes ISBN 978-1-4082-4514-9
- Two Can Play (1982), published in Macmillan Caribbean's 2008 collection of West Indian plays "Two Can Play and Other Plays". ISBN 978-1-4050-5746-2
- The Game (1985)
- Family Planning Musical (1989)
- All in One (1991)
- The Power (1992), commissioned by BBC Radio
- One Stop Driver (1992)
- Dear Counselor (1997)
- Bellas Gate Boy (c.2002), an autobiography, earned the Actor Boy Award for "Best New Play" c.2002.

=== Films ===
- The Harder They Come (1972), co-author.
- Smile Orange (1974), based on his play of the same name.
- Top Rankin'
- Milk and Honey (1988), Toronto Festival of Festivals and Genie Award winner.
- One Love (2003), Cannes Film Festival favourite.

== Honours ==
- Commander of the Order of Distinction.
- Focus of the Caribbean Cultural Theatre's film festival in New York in March 2006.
- Fellow of Rose Bruford College theatre school.
- Jamaica Gleaner Honour Award for contributions to the arts (2007).
- Gold Musgrave Medal, 1988

For a more complete list see Awards and Honours.
