= Finding Samuel Lowe: From Harlem to China =

2014 Jamaican documentary film

- Directed by: Jeanette Kong
- Written by: Jeanette Kong
- Produced by: Jeanette Kong
- Starring: Paula Williams Madison; Elrick Williams; Howard Williams
- Cinematography: Martin Proctor
- Edited by: Jane MacRae
- Release date: 25 July 2014; (Jamaica)
- Running time: 88 minutes
- Countries: Jamaica; USA
- Language: English

Finding Samuel Lowe: From Harlem to China, is a 2015 Jamaican documentary film directed and produced by Jeanette Kong. The film revolves around the a former television executive, Paula Williams Madison and her two older brothers; Elrick and Howard Williams go on a search to find out what happened to their Chinese maternal grandfather Samuel Lowe, who left their Chinese-Jamaican mother Nell Vera Lowe Williams, in the 1930s in Jamaica. Nell travelled to the United States from Jamaica in 1945.

The film received positive reviews and won several awards at international film festivals. Its national premiere was on May 14, 2017 World Channel’s Doc World and was streamed online for free from May 15–June 13, 2017. The film had its screening on 8 February 2014 at Pan African Film Festival.

== Cast ==
- Paula Williams Madison
- Elrick Williams
- Howard Williams
- Vincent J. Chang
- Stephen Young Chin
- Anthony 'Harry' Harrison
- Ouida Harrison
- Andrea Lowe
- Anthony 'Tony' Lowe
- Chow Woo Lowe
- Keith Lowe
- Loraine Lowe
- Minjun Luo
- Siqi Luo
- Seth George Ramocan
- Carol Wong
- Dalton Yap
