= It's All About Dancing: A Jamaican Dance-U-Mentary =

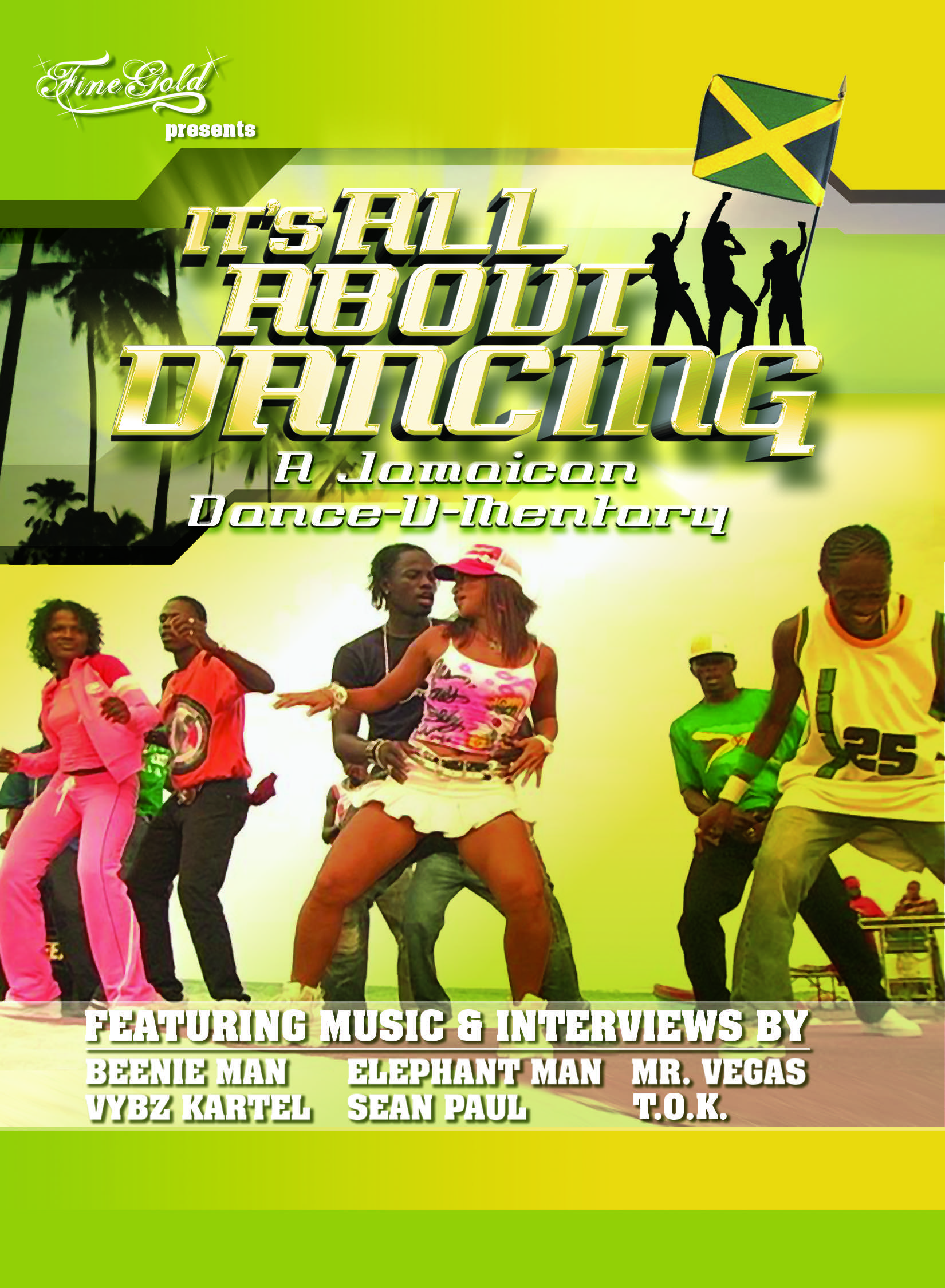
- DVD Cover
- Directed by: Jason "Jay Will" Williams
- Produced by: Carleene Samuels, Jonathan Fine (Executive Producer)
- Starring: Ding Dong, Elephant Man, John Hype
- Cinematography: Shane Sauer
- Edited by: Jay Will
- Production company: Fine Gold Productions
- Distributed by: Penalty/Rykodisc
- Release date: January 14, 2006 (Japan); January 31, 2006 (US)
- Countries: Jamaica, Japan, USA
- Languages: English, Patois

It's All About Dancing: A Jamaican Dance-U-Mentary is a 2006 Jamaican documentary film about dancehall culture. It includes instructional segments about several dance moves that were popular at the time, such as the "Air Force One" or the "Gorilla Warfare".

The film features several dancehall selectors, DJs and dancers, almost all of whom are native to Jamaica; including Ding Dong, the host of the film, Beenie Man, Elephant Man, T.O.K., Mr. Vegas, Voicemail, Macka Diamond, Tanto Metro & Devonte, Tony Matterhorn, Scatta, Richie Feelings, Bogle, John Hype, Ice, Sadiqy & G-Unit, Latisha and Kiyo (dancehall queens). They describe the style, history, language and their personal definitions of dancehall culture, through interviews and monologues inter-spliced with improvisational dance sequences.

== Release ==
It's All About Dancing was screened at Soho House New York, in New York City on May 19, 2006.

The DVD was released internationally through Rykodisc International in Japan on January 14, 2006, and in the United States on January 31, 2006.

== Reception ==
=== Critical response ===
Touch Magazine gave it a five star review, claiming that "The footage from Passa Passa in Tivoli Gardens in Kingston is pretty mental!...this is an interesting documentary with a useful instructional section."

The Voice called It's All About Dancing a "Professional, high quality DVD that offers a thorough insight into the world of Jamaican dances."

John Masouri of Echoes (UK) wrote that "The director doesn't put a foot wrong throughout...It's All About Dancing has plenty to offer dancehall aficionados in general, and not just the fleet-footed among us."

Air Jamaica's in-flight magazine Sky Writings called it a "Vibrant and beautifully executed 'dance-u-mentary'...which shines a spotlight on current Jamaican dance crazes."

Kelefa Sanneh of The New York Times observed that the DVD "clearly was made with outsiders and newcomers in mind", and that it showed that "Ding Dong is a likable star, even though he'll probably never be a nimble lyricist. [...] But in America, where rapid-fire reggae lyrics are often considered an obstacle to success, that may mean he is more marketable than many established reggae stars; no doubt some record executive is hatching a plot right now."

== Featured Tracks ==
The following tracks appear in the movie, in order of appearance:

- Shake It : Sean Paul
- Body Move : Yellowman
- Keep It Jiggy : Elephant Man
- Chakka Dance : Beenie Man
- Wacky Dip : Voicemail
- Jonkanoo Rhythm : Donovan Bennett & Nigel Staff
- Weh Di Time : Voicemail, Delly Ranks & Bogle
- All About Dancing Pt.2 : Tony Matterhorn & Richie Feelings
- Version : Tony Matterhorn & Richie Feelings
- Scoobay Rhythm : Mario C
- Party Time : Danny English & Egg Nog
- Diwali Rhythm : Lenky
- No Apology : Vybz Kartel
- Coolie Dance Rhythm : Cordell "Scatta" Burrell
- Look Good Machine (version) : KC Jockey
- Tic Toc : KC Jockey
- Guala Guala Rhythm : Reggae Vibes Productions
- Perfect Rhythm : Reggae Vibes Productions
- Oh My Swing : Tornado & Ding Dong
- Run Out Pon Dem : Sizzla
- Lightning Flash : Shane-O
- All Dem Deh : Bogle & L.A. Lewis
- Go Down (Rhythm) : J. Marty
- Hot Hot Heat (Rhythm) : Steven “Lenky” Marsden

== Content ==
- "How-to-dance" instructional sessions with Ding Dong, John Hype, Ice and Sadiky
- Interviews and music from: Beenie Man, Vybz Kartel, Sizzla, Sean Paul, Elephant Man, Mr. Vegas, T.O.K., Voicemail, Tony Matterhorn and others
- Documentary degments on the slang, fashion and history of dance
- Over 60 dances including Wacky Dip, Willie Bounce, Oh My Swing, Government, Gorilla Warfare, VIP, Dr. Bird, JAG, Step Away, Scoobay, Air Force 1, Weddy Weddy, Shankle Dip, Santa Bounce
- Dancehall Queen showcase
- Live footage and interviews from "Passa Passa" one of Kingston's most popular and longest running parties.
- Directors bonus footage
- Behind the scenes slideshow
- The DVD also features a tribute to popular dancer Gerald "Bogle" Levy, who had been gunned down in Kingston, Jamaica, on January 20, 2005- one year prior to the film's release date.
