= Willie Apiata =

Victoria Cross for New Zealand medal winner

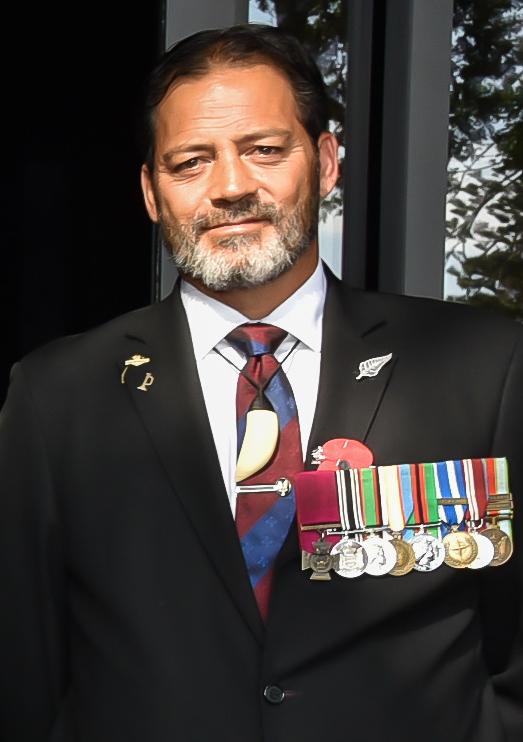
- Apiata in 2020
- Born: 28 June 1972 (age 54); Mangakino, New Zealand
- Military career
- Allegiance: New Zealand
- Branch: New Zealand Army
- Service years: 1989–2012
- Rank: Warrant Officer Class One
- Nickname: Willie
- Service number: M181550
- Units: 6th Battalion, Royal New Zealand Infantry Regiment; New Zealand Special Air Service
- Conflicts: East Timor; War in Afghanistan
- Awards: Victoria Cross for New Zealand

Bill Henry "Willie" Apiata, VC (born 28 June 1972) is an honorary warrant officer class one in the New Zealand Army Reserve Forces. As a corporal in the New Zealand Special Air Service, he became the first recipient of the Victoria Cross for New Zealand. He received the award on 2 July 2007 for bravery under fire during the War in Afghanistan in 2004, in which he carried a gravely wounded comrade across a battlefield, under fire, to safety.

Apiata is the only recipient of the Victoria Cross for New Zealand, which replaced the Imperial Victoria Cross in 1999. There are no living New Zealand recipients of the Victoria Cross, which was last awarded to a New Zealander for actions in the Second World War. Apiata is the second Māori recipient of the VC serving with New Zealand forces, after Second Lieutenant Moana-Nui-a-Kiwa Ngarimu (also of Te Whanau a Apanui). Apiata has donated all of his medals, including his VC, to New Zealand. In 2008 he succeeded Sir Edmund Hillary as the "most trusted New Zealander".

== Early life ==
Apiata was born in Mangakino, New Zealand. His father is Māori and his mother is of European descent. His parents separated, and he has not had contact with his father for several years. His early childhood was spent at Waima in Northland before the family moved to Te Kaha when he was seven. He attended Te Whanau-a-Apanui Area School in Te Kaha, which he left at the age of 15.

Apiata affiliates to the Ngāpuhi iwi (tribe) through his father, but also has a very strong affiliation to Te Whānau-ā-Apanui from his time in the eastern Bay of Plenty. Apiata's home marae is Ngati Kawa Marae at Oromahoe, just south of Kerikeri. The ceremony where he received the Victoria Cross was held at Tukaki Marae in Te Kaha; due to being raised there when younger. In September 2011 Apiata was married to Sade, a chef in the army, but they have since divorced. They have two sons together, and he has a son from an earlier relationship.

== Military career ==
He enlisted in the New Zealand Army on 6 October 1989 in the Territorial Force Hauraki Regiment of the Royal New Zealand Infantry Regiment. He unsuccessfully attempted to join the Special Air Service (SAS) in 1996. From July 2000 to April 2001 he served in East Timor as a member of New Zealand's third Battalion Group as part of the United Nations Transitional Administration in East Timor. On his return he became a full-time soldier. His second attempt to join the SAS in November 2001 was successful.

Apiata was re-deployed to Afghanistan with the NZSAS in 2009 when the New Zealand government opted to return troops to that country. Responding in the aftermath of the January 2010 attacks in Kabul, Apiata was photographed by French photojournalist Philip Poupin. Poupin, who did not know Apiata, photographed Apiata and two companions as they were leaving the "thick of the fight" because "They looked like foreign troops and they were tall and had a specific face, they looked tough and strong". One photo was widely reproduced in New Zealand newspapers, prompting Prime Minister John Key to publicly acknowledge that Apiata was one of the soldiers depicted. The publication has also reopened the debate on the publication of images identifying New Zealand Special Forces personnel with some concerns that in doing so Apiata could become a target for insurgents.

Around 18 July 2012, Apiata left full-time military service to teach adventure skills to young people. He did not resign from the Army and remains with the NZSAS Reserve Forces.

On 22 May 2024, Apiata was promoted to honorary warrant officer class one.

== Victoria Cross ==
=== Citation ===
Apiata (then a lance corporal) was part of a New Zealand Special Air Service (NZSAS) Troop in Afghanistan in 2004 that was attacked by about 20 enemy fighters while holed-up for the night in a rocky rural area. Enemy rocket propelled grenades destroyed one of the troop's vehicles and immobilised another. This was followed by sustained machine gun and automatic rifle fire from close range.

A grenade explosion blew Apiata off the bonnet of his vehicle, where he had been sleeping. Two other soldiers in or near the vehicle were wounded by shrapnel, one of them seriously (Corporal D). After finding cover, it was seen that Corporal D had life-threatening arterial bleeding and was deteriorating rapidly.

Apiata assumed command of the situation, deciding all three would need to rejoin the troop which was about 70 metres to the rear. Apiata decided his only option was to carry Corporal D to safety, and none of the three were hit during the retreat. After getting Corporal D to shelter, Apiata rejoined the firefight.

He became one of the very few living holders of the Victoria Cross. In part the citation reads:

In total disregard of his own safety, Lance Corporal Apiata stood up and lifted his comrade bodily. He then carried him across the seventy metres of broken, rocky and fire swept ground, fully exposed in the glare of battle to heavy enemy fire and into the face of returning fire from the main Troop position. That neither he nor his colleague were hit is scarcely possible. Having delivered his wounded companion to relative shelter with the remainder of the patrol, Lance Corporal Apiata re-armed himself and rejoined the fight in counter-attack.

Three other SAS soldiers also received bravery awards for actions during the same mission. Two received the New Zealand Gallantry Decoration and one the New Zealand Gallantry Medal.

=== Ceremonies ===
The investiture took place on 26 July 2007 at Government House, Wellington. The ceremony was presided over by Sir Anand Satyanand, the Governor-General of New Zealand, with the Prime Minister Helen Clark, and Apiata's army colleagues, in attendance. A separate homecoming ceremony was held in his home town of Te Kaha.

As per her request, Apiata (alongside other Victoria Cross recipients) attended the funeral of Queen Elizabeth II on Sept 19, 2022. He also represented recipients of the Cross at the Coronation of Charles III and Camilla.

=== VC gifted to nation ===
In April 2008, Apiata donated his Victoria Cross of New Zealand medal to the NZSAS Trust, so that "the medal is protected for future generations". The medal remains available to Apiata and his family to wear.

In early April 2025, Apiata gave this Victoria Cross of New Zealand medal to Minister for Veterans Chris Penk as part of efforts to lobby the New Zealand Parliament to pass legislation changing the definition of veterans. Under the Veteran Supports Act 2014, only veterans injured while serving overseas during a war or emergency operation qualify for pensions and compensation for service-related injuries or illness unless they served before the Accident Compensation Corporation (ACC) was founded in 1974.

== Medal ribbons ==
Apiata's medal ribbons, as they would appear on the left breast of his uniform, are:

1st Row	Victoria Cross for New Zealand		New Zealand Operational Service Medal	
2nd Row	East Timor Medal	United Nations Mission in East Timor (UNAMET) Medal	New Zealand General Service Medal for Afghanistan	NATO Medal for the Non-Article 5 ISAF Operation in Afghanistan
3rd Row	Queen Elizabeth II Diamond Jubilee Medal	Queen Elizabeth II Platinum Jubilee Medal	King Charles III Coronation Medal	New Zealand Defence Service Medal

Apiata is also entitled to wear the emblem of the US Navy and Marine Corps Presidential Unit Citation on the right breast of the uniform.

== RSA Badge in Gold ==
On Armistice Day, 11 November 2007, Apiata was presented with the Badge in Gold, the highest honour awarded by the Royal New Zealand Returned and Services' Association (RSA). The award was made in the Gallipoli Room at ANZAC House by the Governor-General Anand Satyanand who also presented him with life membership of the RSA.

== See also ==
- List of New Zealand Victoria Cross recipients
