= Smile Jamaica =

- Screenshot of set of show
- Genre: News/talk
- Starring: Neville Bell, Simone Clark-Cooper, Dahlia Harris
- Narrated by: none
- Country of origin: Jamaica
- Original languages: English, Jamaican English

Production
- Camera setup: Multi-camera
- Running time: 2 1/2 hours
- Production company: RJRGleaner Communications Group

Original release
- Network: Television Jamaica

Smile Jamaica is a Jamaican-produced television show that is broadcast on Television Jamaica (TVJ) on weekdays from 6:00 am – 8:30 am (Jamaican time). It is the premier morning show for the network providing programming of news, information and entertainment.
