= Paula Williams Madison =

American journalist and businesswoman

- Born: Harlem, New York, U.S.
- Education: Vassar College
- Occupations: Journalist, businessperson, executive
- Notable work: Finding Samuel Lowe: China, Jamaica, Harlem

Paula Williams Madison (née Williams) (born 1953) is an American journalist, writer, businessperson, executive and a former NBCUniversal executive who is now CEO of a family investment group based in Chicago. On May 20, 2011, she retired from NBC after more than 35 years in the news media. She is currently the chairman and CEO of Madison Media Management LLC, a Los Angeles–based media consultancy company with global reach.

== Personal life ==
Madison grew up in Harlem with her brothers Elrick and Howard. Their mother, Nell Vera Lowe Williams (née Lowe), was a Jamaican immigrant and single parent. Madison and her brothers founded Williams Holdings, a real estate investment firm and later bought a majority share of The Africa Channel. The company also bought the Los Angeles Sparks, which they sold in 2014 to Magic Johnson.

Madison was named one of the "75 Most Powerful African Americans in Corporate America" by Black Enterprise magazine in 2005 and in 2014 as one of the Outstanding 50 Asian Americans in Business. She is of African and Hakka descent. In 2015, she wrote the book Finding Samuel Lowe: China, Jamaica, Harlem about her grandfather's life and travels and her own visit to Guangdong. She began research for the book shortly after retiring from NBC.

In 2015, Madison was recognized by East West Players for her contributions to the Asian American community, in particular for her documentary Finding Samuel Lowe: From Harlem to China, which chronicled the journey she and her brothers went on to rediscover their estranged father's side of the family.
