= Glory to Gloriana =

- Film poster
- Directed by: Lennie Little-White
- Written by: Raye Addison
- Produced by: Damali Little-White
- Starring: Carol Campbell; Rodney Campbell; Gracie-Ann Waston; Keire-Ann Lewis; Winston Bell; Marguerite Newland
- Cinematography: Ray Smith
- Music by: Jon Williams
- Production company: Mediamix Productions
- Release date: 10 May 2006
- Country: Jamaica
- Languages: English; Jamaican Patois

Glory to Gloriana is a 2006 Jamaican film about the trials and tribulations of "Gloria" Eugenie Carroll Minto, an hotel owner. It is based on the first half of her autobiography, Gloria to Gloriana.

The film was directed by Tony Jenkins and produced by Salt Oil Green Production.

It tells the story of a woman who, despite her modest upbringing achieves her professional ambitions. The film addresses the topics of the weight of financial debt, domestic violence and adultery/love triangles.

== Reception ==
"This true rags-to-riches tale of Gloria Minto packed theaters in its native Jamaica.", commented TV Guide. The film is said to be one the rare Jamaican films that managed to reach wider British audiences.

== See also ==
- List of Jamaican films
