= Passa Passa =

Passa Passa is a weekly street party that originated in Kingston, Jamaica. It has spread to other areas in the Caribbean, including Colón, Panama Limón, Costa Rica and later Puerto Rico. It is reported to have begun on Ash Wednesday in 2003 with the name being coined by Carl Shelley. It features dancehall music. It is similar to a block party. The Passa Passa usually gets started around 1 a.m. and has been known to continue straight through until 8 a.m.

Artists, selectors, and dancers who usually attend and have done a great deal to build the dance for what it is today include: Bogle, Ding Dong (dancehall performer), Marvin, Kartoon, Aneika Headtop, Ravers Clavers, Black Blingaz, Timeless Crew, Shelly Belly, Spikes, John Hype, Sample 6, Sherika Future, Jermaine Squad, Sadiki, Swatch, Maestro, Beenie Man and Future Girls.

Passa Passa has drawn many professional and amateur dancers into the media spotlight as the event is typically videotaped for mass DVD distribution. Many of the popular Jamaican dancers, such as the late Bogle and Ding Dong, have made appearances on these videos. The spread of dancehall popularity, particularly in Japan and Europe, attracts many international dancehall fans along with the hundreds of Jamaicans who attend weekly.

Among other opportunities for street dancing and parties, Passa Passa was also the location for the queering of the masculine Jamaican identity. In the late 1990s and early 2000s, many Dancehall/Reggae songs started to espouse homophobic rhetoric, such as T.O.K.’s “Chi Chi Man,” while male dance crews were beginning to explode in popularity. These two trends fostered a homosocial, sometimes homoerotic, space for Jamaican men where societal rules surrounding masculinity were not strictly enforced. These songs, oftentimes played during Passa Passa, created a space in which no one could be considered “gay” or “queer," as it was assumed the ideas the songs promoted were shared by everyone present. As Nadia Ellis writes, “The songs are played; no one is “gay”; everyone can turn a blind eye." Due to this increased freedom, men could explore fashion much more openly, including the ability to wear “tight clothes; bold accessories of metal; gemstone, and cloth; hair in relaxers and braids”.

Grenada's Education Minister, Claris Charles, called for a ban of the dance in that country in 2006.
