= Victoria Cross for New Zealand =

Military decoration of the New Zealand Armed Forces

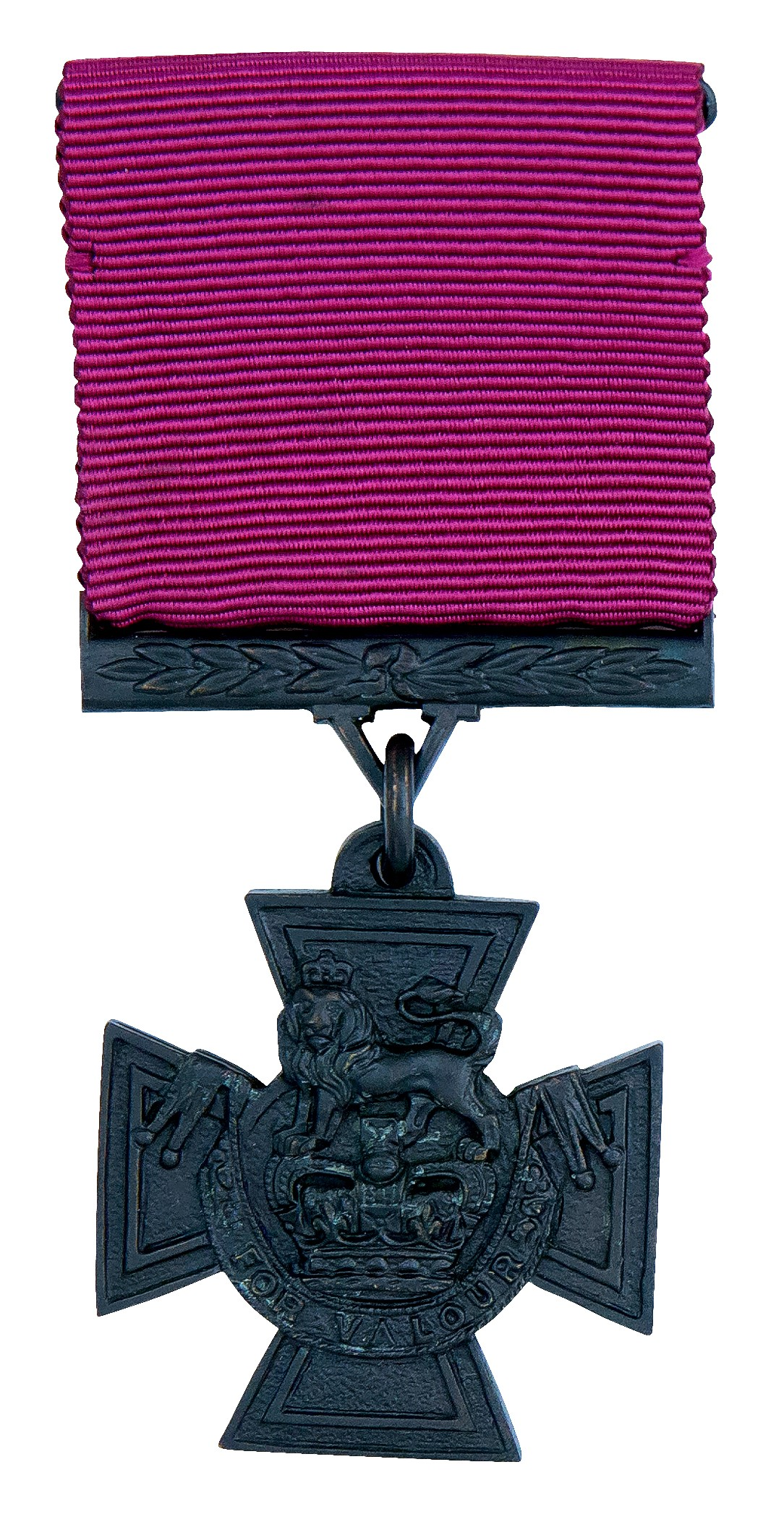
- Type: Military decoration
- Awarded for: "... most conspicuous gallantry, or some daring or pre-eminent act of valour or self-sacrifice or extreme devotion to duty in the presence of the enemy or belligerents."
- Presented by: New Zealand
- Eligibility: New Zealand military personnel
- Status: Currently awarded
- Established: 24 September 1999
- First award: 2 July 2007
- Founder: Elizabeth II

Highlights
- Total: 1
- Ribbon: 32 millimetres, crimson.

Precedence
- Next (higher): Highest
- Equivalent: New Zealand Cross
- Next (lower): New Zealand Gallantry Star

The Victoria Cross for New Zealand (VC; Māori: Rīpeka Wikitōria mo Aotearoa) is a military decoration awarded for valour or gallantry in the presence of the enemy to members of the New Zealand Armed Forces. It may be awarded to a person of any rank in any service and civilians under military command, and is presented to the recipient by the governor-general of New Zealand during an investiture held at Government House, Wellington. As the highest award for gallantry in New Zealand it takes precedence over all other postnominals and medals.

The Victoria Cross for New Zealand was established in 1999 when New Zealand created a new award system that replaced several British honours with New Zealand awards. It is based on the original British Victoria Cross introduced in 1856 by Queen Victoria to reward acts of valour during the Crimean War. The Victoria Cross for New Zealand has been awarded once, on 2 July 2007, to Lance Corporal Willie Apiata for actions in 2004. The medal itself is made of gunmetal derived from cannons captured by the British in 19th century campaigns in either Russia or China. Australia and Canada also have their own versions of the Victoria Cross which are used as the highest award for gallantry by military personnel of those countries.

== Origin ==
=== Victoria Cross ===
The original Victoria Cross (VC) was created by Queen Victoria in 1856 to recognise acts of gallantry performed by British military and naval personnel, both officers and enlisted men. It was to be the highest award for bravery that could be bestowed by The Crown. The Queen signed a royal warrant on 29 January 1856 that officially instituted the VC, and made it retroactive to 1854 to recognise acts of valour performed during the Crimean War.

The VC medals were originally cast from ingots of gunmetal sourced from the cascabels of captured cannons, mostly likely captured during the siege of Sevastopol, in the Crimean War. Originally believed to have been Russian-made cannons, it has since been determined they originated from China so it is possible that they may have been captured during the British campaigns in that country. The metal is treated with chemicals to bring it to a bronze colour.

A single company of jewellers, Hancocks of London, has been responsible for the production of every VC to date, including the prototypes. It is unclear who designed the medal but Queen Victoria had some input on its design after seeing drawings of the proposed medal and handling the proof example. The original specimen of the medal was approved on 3 March 1856 and formed the pattern for the subsequent VCs. The proof example is in the medal collection at Windsor Castle while the original specimen was initially retained by the Hancocks family. It was subsequently passed to the Royal Fusiliers which, as of 2016, has the medal in its museum.

The VC has been awarded to 21 men serving in the New Zealand military, the first in 1867 to Major Charles Heaphy for actions in the Invasion of the Waikato, during the New Zealand Wars, and most recently, in 1946, to Squadron Leader Leonard Trent for his part in Operation Ramrod 16 during the Second World War. One recipient, Charles Upham, was awarded the VC twice.

=== Separate Commonwealth awards ===
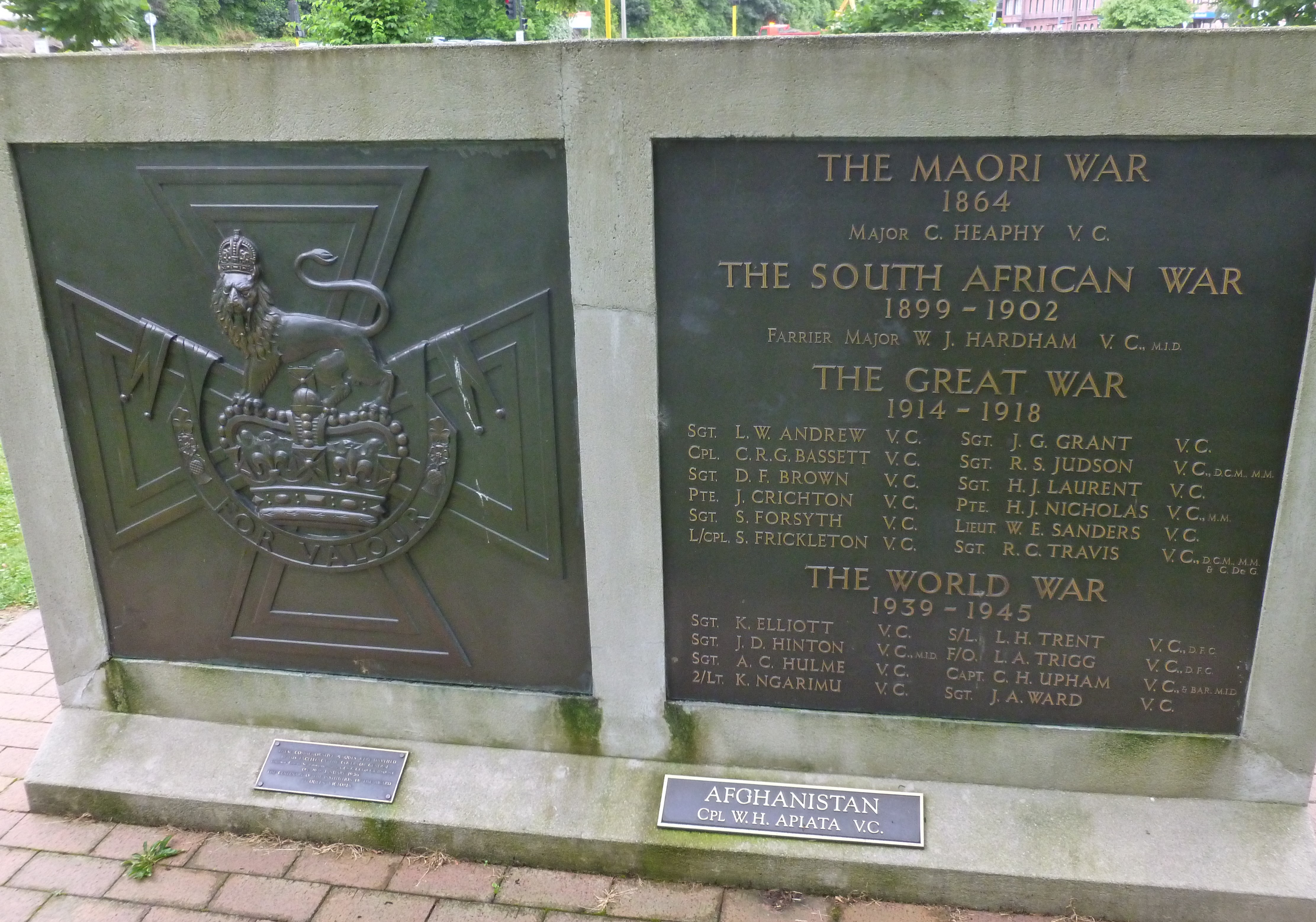
Victoria Cross plaque, Queens Gardens, Dunedin, listing all of the New Zealand military's recipients of the VC, including a separate plaque (lower right) for the only Victoria Cross for New Zealand to be awarded

In recent times, a number of Commonwealth countries have introduced their own honours systems, separate from the British honours system. In New Zealand, this process began in 1975 with the introduction of the Queen's Service Order, awarded to civilians, as a supplement to the British honours system. Twenty years later, with many honours now New Zealand-based, the New Zealand government undertook a review of the honours system.

The review, conducted by a Honours Advisory Committee established by Prime Minister Jim Bolger, recommended the replacement of the existing British honours system with a New Zealand version. This extended to the introduction of New Zealand-based awards for gallantry, replacing existing British decorations such as the Distinguished Service Order and Distinguished Conduct Medal.

== Creation ==
The Honours Advisory Committee devised four levels of awards for New Zealand military personnel to recognise acts of gallantry performed in wartime, or in war-like conditions, the latter intended to cover actions performed in peace-keeping. These awards did away with separate gallantry honours for officers and other ranks. In particular it was proposed that the existing VC, as the highest level of gallantry award, be replaced with the Victoria Cross for New Zealand. The proposal was announced in May 1998 and formally came into effect the following year, being instituted by Elizabeth II in her capacity as monarch of New Zealand.

The Victoria Cross for New Zealand is awarded for:

...most conspicuous gallantry, or some daring or pre-eminent act of valour or self-sacrifice or extreme devotion to duty in the presence of the enemy or of belligerents.

— The New Zealand Gallantry Awards: Royal Warrant, SR1999/318, 24 September 1999

New Zealand was not the first Commonwealth country to create its own VC; Australia was the first to do so, in 1991, followed by Canada two years later.

== Appearance ==
The Victoria Cross for New Zealand is identical to the original design. The decoration is a cross pattée, having straight edges and approximately 36 millimetres (1.4 in) square, bearing a crown surmounted by a lion, and the inscription "For Valour". The cross is suspended by a ring from a seriffed "V" to a bar ornamented with laurel leaves, through which the ribbon passes. The reverse of the suspension bar is engraved with the recipient's name, rank, number and unit. On the reverse of the medal is a circular panel on which the date of the act for which it was awarded is engraved in the centre. The ribbon is crimson, 38 millimetres (1.5 in) wide.

The decoration, suspension bar and link weigh about 27 grams (0.95 oz). The medal is worn on the left side of the chest, and precedes all other decorations worn by the recipient. A half size miniature medal may be worn on certain occasions in lieu of the medal itself and when wearing ribbons, a small bronze emblem as a representation of the Victoria Cross for New Zealand is affixed to the ribbon corresponding to the award. Recipients are entitled to a postnominal following their name, this being "VC".

== Conferment ==
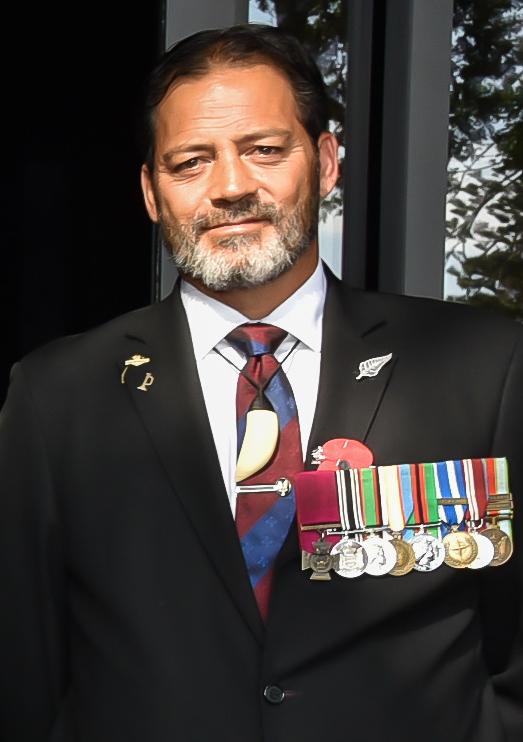
Willie Apiata, VC in 2020; the VC is worn on the left, taking precedence over all other awards

The power of awarding the medal officially resides with the monarch of New Zealand. The royal warrant states that the "Awards of a New Zealand Gallantry Award and of a Bar to an Award shall be made by Us, Our Heirs and Successors, only on a recommendation by Our Prime Minister of New Zealand or a Minister of the Crown acting for Our Prime Minister." As with the original VC, any recommendations pass through the New Zealand Defence Force chain of command to the Minister of Defence.

As of 2025, the Victoria Cross for New Zealand has been awarded once, to Lance Corporal Willie Apiata of the Special Air Service of New Zealand (NZSAS). In mid-2004, his NZSAS troop, driving a number of vehicles, was on patrol in Afghanistan. Having visited a local village, the troop bivouacked on high ground for the night. Their campsite was spread out with some trucks, having not entered the village, obscured from view. In the night their main campsite came under attack. At the time, Apiata was asleep on the bonnet of his vehicle when it was struck by a rocket-propelled grenade. Flung clear, he and two other men, one seriously wounded, took shelter behind their blown up vehicle. When gunfire from one of the obscured vehicles provided a distraction, Apiata led the trio to link up with the others of the troop although the wounded man could only cover a short distance before collapsing. Apiata picked up and carried him the rest of the way, despite heavy gunfire. After handing over his comrade to a medic, he found a weapon, having lost his at the start of the attack, and joined in the engagement. The attackers were driven off and in the morning, helicopters delivered replacement vehicles and extracted the wounded. The NZSAS troop, including Apiata, resumed their patrol, finishing 12 days later.

After an investigation into the events of the patrol, the chief of the New Zealand Defence Force, Air Marshal Bruce Ferguson, recommended Apiata for the Victoria Cross for New Zealand. The nomination was given careful scrutiny given it was the first time that this award was being made. Helen Clark, then the prime minister of New Zealand, put forward the nomination to Buckingham Palace for royal assent. The award was publicly announced on 2 July 2007 and Apiata was invested with the medal at Government House in Wellington later that month, on 26 July.

== See also ==
- Victoria Cross for Australia
- Victoria Cross for Canada
