= One Love (2003 film) =

- Directed by: Rick Elgood; Don Letts
- Written by: Trevor D. Rhone
- Produced by: Nik Powell
- Starring: Ky-Mani Marley; Cherine Anderson; Vas Blackwood; Idris Elba
- Distributed by: Blue Dolphin Film Distributors
- Release date: 7 September 2003 (Toronto Film Festival)
- Running time: 97 minutes
- Country: Jamaica
- Language: English

One Love is a 2003 Jamaican film starring Ky-Mani Marley and Cherine Anderson. It was written by Trevor D. Rhone and directed by Rick Elgood and Don Letts.

== Plot ==
A young Rasta musician falls in love with the gospel-singing daughter of a Pentecostal preacher, meeting her as they both sign up for a music contest in which the winner will get twenty thousand US dollars and a record deal. When they start falling in love her father forbids her from seeing him because he wants her to marry a church member. They face overcoming the preacher's disapproval as well as battling a corrupt record producer.

== Cast ==
- Ky-Mani Marley as Kassa
- Vas Blackwood as Scarface
- Cherine Anderson as Serena
- Idris Elba as Aaron
- Winston Bell as Selector G
- Winston Stona as Pastor Johnson

In addition to the singing of the two principals, the soundtrack includes Bob Marley and Shaggy.
