= Smile Orange =

1976 Jamaican film by Trevor Rhone

- Directed by: Trevor D. Rhone
- Written by: Trevor D. Rhone (play); David Ogden
- Produced by: Edward Knight
- Starring: Carl Bradshaw; Glenn Morrison; Stanley Irons; Vaughn Crosskill
- Cinematography: David McDonald
- Edited by: Mike Gilligan; Joe Staton
- Music by: Melba Liston
- Production company: Knuts
- Release date: 19 May 1976; (New York)
- Running time: 86 minutes
- Country: Jamaica
- Language: English

Smile Orange is a 1976 satirical film set in Jamaica. It follows the day-to-day life of Ringo, played by Carl Bradshaw, a smooth-talking waiter and con-man. The film explores the tourism industry in the Caribbean and seems to suggest there are similarities to slavery in that industry.

The film was directed by Trevor D. Rhone, who also wrote the play on which it is based, and was produced by Edward Knight. The movie stars Bradshaw, Glenn Morrison, and Stanley Irons.

== Critical acclaim ==
Trevor Rhone's 1976 Smile Orange has received praise and criticism across the globe. The day after the film's debut in the United States, the New York Times writer Richard Eder remarked on the film's "wittiness and pungency" but criticized its technical cinematographic elements as "terribly awkward."

Time Out London hailed Smile Orange a "genuinely hilarious politicized farce…a satire on tourism that centers on hotel waiter Ringo Smith's efforts to exploit the exploiters."

The film was praised by The Gleaner, a Jamaican newspaper. On 6 November 2010, writer Andrew Robinson published the newspaper's top five Jamaican films. Smile Orange was placed at number three, and called "comedic, cinematic gold."

Ras Zuke, author of Rastaman Vibration has also commented on Smile Orange. He explains that the film allows people to experience the exploited resort culture of Jamaica with a clearer understanding of the relationships between skin color and positions of power, the urban and rural lifestyle conflicts, and the interaction between women and men of Jamaica.
