= Television Jamaica =

Television Jamaica Limited (TVJ)
ATSC 3.0 station
- Kingston; Jamaica

Ownership
- Owner: RJRGleaner Communications Group; (Radio Jamaica Limited)

History
- First air date: August 1, 1997

Links
- Website: https://www.televisionjamaica.com/

Television Jamaica (TVJ) is a national television network in Kingston, Jamaica, a subsidiary of the RJRGleaner Communications Group. It is one of Jamaica's two major television stations.

TVJ has had a number of managers, the general manager being Dr. Claire Grant who was appointed the position in September 2012.

== History ==
TVJ first aired as JBC Television. JBC Television started broadcasting on August 6, 1963, exactly one year after the country achieved its independence from the United Kingdom. Due to budget constraints, the bulk of its initial line-up was imported from British and American companies. The election of Michael Manley in 1972 gave JBC increased funding for local productions, such as Public Eye and Jamaica's first soap opera Lime Tree Lane. In the 1980s, the privatization process of the corporation began.

The current station was created following the privatization of the former Jamaica Broadcasting Corporation, whose television station started in 1963. Both JBC Radio 2 and JBC Television were acquired by RJR. As consequence, the station was renamed Super Supreme Television (SSTV) on August 1, 1997. In order to improve its public image, a new, more attractive look was created and its carriage of national events improved. In October 1998, SSTV was renamed Television Jamaica.

In 2022, TVJ became the first television network in the country to broadcast in ATSC 3.0; with Kingston in January, and Montego Bay in July.

== Programming ==
TVJ has produced various local programmes, including morning show Smile Jamaica, Profile, All Together Sing, Entertainment Report, Eye on Sports, Prime Time News, Intense, Schools' Challenge Quiz, Junior Schools' Challenge Quiz and All Angles.

The station also airs acquired, overseas programs, such as The Jamie Foxx Show, George Lopez, Girlfriends, All of Us, and Are We There Yet?.

== See also ==
- CVM Television
- RJR 94 FM
