= Franklyn St Juste =

Jamaican film-maker (1929–2019)

Franklyn St Juste OD
- St Juste, c. 1970
- Born: Franklyn Joseph-Marie St Juste; 1929; Trinidad and Tobago
- Died: 5 November 2019 (aged 89–90); Kingston, Jamaica
- Other name: Chappie St Juste
- Occupations: film-maker; director; cinematographer; editor; university lecturer; civil servant
- Children: 3

Franklyn Joseph-Marie St Juste OD (1929 – 5 November 2019), also known as Chappie St Juste, was a Trinidadian-born Jamaican film-maker, educator and theatrical lighting designer. He is best known for his work as a cinematographer on the film The Harder They Come (1972), directed by Perry Henzell, and for his work with the Jamaica Film Unit and Jamaica Information Service.

== Early life ==
Franklyn Joseph-Marie St Juste was born in Trinidad in 1929 to a father of Saint Lucian extraction and his wife. He attended high school in Trinidad before moving to Saint Lucia. St Juste's father owned a cinema in the town of Soufrière, on the western side of the island, which St Juste began to manage from age 17. Later, he began a job in customs at Saint Lucia's capital, Castries. He then transferred to the government's Treasury Department and subsequently the Audit Department. During this time, St Juste taught himself photography, practicing with a box camera his mother had given him. When Elizabeth II was coronated, St Juste contributed material he had recorded of local celebrations and his footage was included in the BBC's film Her People Rejoiced (1953).

== Career ==
=== Jamaica Film Unit ===
St Juste subsequently became employed by the Trinidad and Tobago Film Unit, filming Trinidad Carnival Fiesta (1957) in colour. He then moved to Jamaica, joining the Jamaica Information Service (JIS; formerly the Government Public Relations Office) in 1958 and working as a senior technician for the JIS's Film Production Unit. In 1959, he trained with the National Film Board of Canada and for seven months in England, with the BBC. In 1966, St Juste was director of photography for the eighth British Empire and Commonwealth Games which were held in Jamaica, after which he returned to London with the footage to edit the film.

St Juste joined the Jamaica Film Unit (JFU) in the mid to late 1960s as a director of photography, later directing film productions himself. The academic Terri Francis identifies St Juste, along with Trevor Welsh and Martin Rennalls, as "the three major directors of the Unit". As a cinematographer for both the JFU and JIS, he filmed many important moments in Jamaican history, such as the lowering of the Union Jack and its replacement with the flag of Jamaica when the country was granted her independence from the British Empire in 1962, which he captured for the film A Nation is Born. For Lion of Judah (1966), St Juste filmed the visit of Emperor Haile Selassie I to Jamaica. He also filmed the interment of Marcus Garvey into his tomb at National Heroes Park in Kingston, 1964.

=== Independent work ===
St Juste was a cinematographer for Carey Robinson's dramatisation of the life of Paul Bogle and the Morant Bay rebellion, Time of Fury (1965). He later worked as a cinematographer on Jamaica's first feature film produced after Independence, The Harder They Come (1972), directed by Perry Henzell and starring Jimmy Cliff. The cult success of the film as a midnight movie in the United States is regarded as partially responsible for the proliferation of reggae music internationally. St Juste also worked on Lennie Little-White's Children of Babylon (1980), starring Bob Andy, and Michael Mooleedhar's short film The Cool Boys (2012).

St Just also worked as a theatrical lighting designer, notably on the Television Jamaica talent show Digicel Rising Stars; and for the Jamaican Folk Singers's show Out of Many, One (2008).

=== Teaching ===
In the mid-1970s, St Juste was invited to work part-time as a lecturer in film production at University of the West Indies (UWI), Mona campus, later becoming a senior lecturer at UWI Mona's Caribbean Institute of Media and Communication as well as a visiting lecturer at UWI St Augustine in Trinidad and Tobago. He also taught at the Creative Production and Training Centre in Jamaica, where he was made a board member in 2016.

== Lobbying for film repatriation ==
Beginning in the 1970s, St Juste was active in lobbying ex-colonial Caribbean governments to ask for the return of footage of national significance, much of which was captured as part of colonial projects and therefore resides in Europe. On this subject, he contributed the essay "The Repatriation of Jamaican Film Images" to Film and the End of Empire, edited by Lee Grieveson and Colin MacCabe, published the British Film Institute in 2011.

== Personal life and death ==
Franklyn St Juste was born in Trinidad and gained Saint Lucian citizenship from his father; he was later a naturalised Jamaican national. He died from complications due to cancer on 5 November 2019 at the University Hospital of the West Indies, at Mona. He was survived by two sons and a daughter.

== Honours ==
- In 1998, St Juste was honoured for a lifetime achievement in film with the Doctor Bird Award.
- In 2004, the Institute of Jamaica awarded St Juste with the Musgrave Medal in silver and, later that year, the Jamaican government conferred him with the Order of Distinction (Officer Class).
- In 2008, the CaribbeanTales International Film Festival in Canada awarded St Juste with their Lifetime Achievement Award.
- In 2012, Sir Patrick Allen awarded St Juste the Govenor General's Medal of Honour.

The Franklyn St Juste Award for Best Directing, presented by GATFFEST Film Festival, affiliated with the UWI, is named in St Juste's honour.
