= Black film =

Film largely featuring or representing black people

Black film is a classification of film that has a broad definition relating to the film involving participation and/or representation of black people. The definition may involve the film having a black cast, a black crew, a black director, a black story, or a focus on black audiences. Academic Romi Crawford said, "I think a black film is a film work that takes into account in some way the relationship of African-Americans or blacks from the African Diaspora to filmmaking practice, means and industry. For me, it's in that relation between blacks and the film industry. How one engages in that relationship can be a mixture of black director and black acting talent; black director and black content in story; black content in story, no black director; black production money, nothing else that reads as black."

Film industries were established in many areas during the colonial era. The Colonial Film Unit was established by Great Britain. It included the Jamaica Film Unit. Filmmaking in Colonial Nigeria was carried out. Orlando Martins became a Nigerian film star. The Golden Age of Nigerian Cinema came later.

== United States ==

Chicago Tribune's Allan Johnson said in 2005 that the definition is blurred by black actors who star in films where their ethnicity is unrelated to their character, such as Denzel Washington, Jamie Foxx, Will Smith, and Halle Berry. Several black directors also have directed films unrelated to their ethnicity, including Antoine Fuqua, Angela Robinson, and Tim Story.

Quantitative research has also measured Black representation as a continuous attribute of films rather than classifying films categorically. A 2024 computational analysis measured the share of onscreen time attributable to actors of different racial groups and documented a substantial long-term increase in Black representation in Hollywood films. Using these screentime measures, a 2026 study found that Black representation was lower when credit conditions tightened and higher when GDP grew, and that greater Black screentime was associated with marginally higher domestic gross but lower international revenue share and worldwide gross.

The American Black Film Festival was made by marketing executive Jeff Friday, who created the criteria for a film to qualify as a best picture candidate. A film must have eight points to qualify. Four points are given for each executive producer, producer, writer, director, and lead actor and actress involved with the film. Two points are given for each supporting actor and actress. Friday acknowledged the varied possibilities of the scoring system and said part of the goal of the award ceremony was also to recognize people of color behind the camera.

== Nigeria ==
Nigerian Flag

Nigeria's film industry, Nollywood, is recognized as the second-largest film industry in the world in terms of production quantity. Surpassing Hollywood, and just behind Bollywood, Nollywood produced 2,599 films in 2020 alone, which was reported by the National Bureau of Statistics. Nollywood's high production rate is attributed to its rapid filming processes and low production costs. In an interview with the College of Communications, Nigerian Cinematographer Tunji Akinsehinwa mentions that Nollywood could probably produce half of the films in Nigeria on the budget of only one American Marvel Cinematic Universe movie, which tend to cost roughly 200 million dollars.

In 1926, Nigeria saw the production of its first ever feature film, Palaver, written and directed by a white British filmmaker. Even so, the film is considered to be a significant part of black film history due to its multiple Nigerian supporting actors. Today, "Palaver" is widely criticized for its imperialistic perspective, with Zikoko describing it as a "proudly racist movie". The Black citizens of Nigeria were unable to see the film until the mid-20th century, when Nigeria gained Independence from Britain and movie theaters were able to began construction across the country.

It wasn't until the 1990s when the Nigerian film industry truly developed. Due to a massive surge in television sales, producers began to help filmmakers complete and distribute their work. The main source of distribution was selling CDs, VHSs, and eventually DVDs through local markets. The drawback, according to Tunji Akinsehinwa, was that markets had only two or three weeks before piracy began, which would cause a significant drop in sales.

By the 2020s, the Nigerian film industry had evolved once more, driven by the rise of streaming. The Nigerian Patriot signifies how Nollywood now has the ability to reach a worldwide audience through platforms like YouTube, iROKOtv, and Netflix . Most notably, in 2018, Lionheart became the first ever Netflix-produced Nigerian film, written, directed, and starring Genevieve Nnaji, one of Nollywood's most celebrated actors. Despite this milestone, Nigeria has yet to be nominated for an Academy Award, which is one of the industry's most sought-after aspirations. In 2019, Lionheart was up for contention to be nominated in the "best foreign language film" category, but was disqualified for being spoken almost entirely in English, Nigeria's official language. The decision sparked global outcry, with many criticizing the Academy for its decision. Succeeding this controversy, the category was renamed Best International Feature Film".

== See also ==
- Race film
- List of Afrofuturist films
- Blaxploitation
- List of films about black girlhood
- Hood film

== Bibliography ==
- Diawara, Manthia, ed. (1993). Black American Cinema. AFI Film Readers. Routledge. ISBN 978-0-415-90397-4.
- Gillespie, Michael Boyce (2016). Film Blackness: American Cinema and the Idea of Black Film. Duke University Press Books. ISBN 978-0-8223-6226-5.
- Gripps, Thomas (1978). Black Film as Genre. Indiana University Press. ISBN 978-0-253-37502-5.
- Reid, Mark A. (1993). Redefining Black Film. University of California Press. ISBN 978-0-520-07902-1.
- Yearwood, Gladstone Lloyd (1999). Black Film as a Signifying Practice: Cinema, Narration and the African American Aesthetic Tradition. Africa World Press. ISBN 978-0-86543-715-9.
- Akande, Segun. “You Should Know about ‘Palaver’, the First Nigerian Movie Ever.” Zikoko!, 22 July 2019.
- Ugobude, Franklin. “Nollywood: A Complete History of How It Came to Be.” OkayAfrica, 1 Nov. 2024.
- Ogungbangbe, Ikeoluwa. “How Nollywood Rose to Become the World’s Second-Largest Film Industry.” The Nigerian Patriot, 3 Oct.
- Sassoon, Mara. “Nollywood: The next Big Thing.” College of Communication, 1 May 2023.
- Tinubu, Aramide A. “The Oscars Disqualified ‘Lionheart’ Because Nigerians Speak English in It - Just like in Nigeria.” NBCNews.Com, NBCUniversal News Group, 8 Nov. 2019.
