= William Sellers (colonial officer) =

British colonial health official and filmmaker

William Sellers was a British colonial health official who introduced experimental instructional methods and propaganda to Nigerian cinema. Sellers was the first director of the Colonial Film Unit, a unit initially developed to explain World War II to the African audience and build war support in the colonies but later became a medium for backing colonial development and the British way of life. Sellers' films had its share of critics, his filming technique was simple repetitive shots and plots with strict literal interpretations that a few other colonial era filmmakers like Julian Huxley felt was boring to the audience.

A lot of recent scholarship about Sellers' works has been focused on his regressive assumptions about the cognitive abilities of uneducated African moviegoers.

== Career ==
=== Health films in Nigeria ===
In the mid-1920s, Sellers was a British civil servant who worked in the sanitation and health department in Lagos. In 1924, Lagos had a severe outbreak of Bubonic plague. To raise awareness about the positive effects of good sanitation and ways to eradicate the plague, Sellers in 1929 developed an instructional film called Anti-Plague Operations in Lagos to visually convey the message of how rats cause plague. After the first film, Sellers was encouraged with using cinema as an educational tool. In 1931, he began using mobile cinemas equipped with a generator and projector to transmit images in open fields. Over the next seven years and with the help of a grant from the Colonial Development Fund, Sellers produced fifteen health educational films.

By 1936, Sellers mobile cinema had reached Northern Nigeria was on a tour of various Northern Nigerian cities. In 1937, the traveling unit had a stop in Kano, a populous traditional Hausa state. In Kano, instructional lectures to education and health officials here held during the afternoon and in the evening the mobile cinema moved to the compound of the Emir with an open air screening of healthcare documentaries. These documentaries were shown to the emir, native authority officials and prominent residents of Kano to encourage the traditional authorities acceptance of Sellers message.

In October 1939, the Colonial Film Unit was created out the Films Division of the Ministry of Information with Sellers appointed its first director. Sellers enlisted the support of George Pearson for the production of the unit's first films. The initial office of the unit was an office space in Soho Square close to the GPO Film Unit and with crew assistance from the GPO. In 1940, the CFU brought in a fleet of mobile cinema vans to be used across British West Africa but maintained central control of all movies shown until the late 1940s.

=== Filming method ===
Sellers observation of Africans watching his mobile cinema led him to some regressive conclusions. Seller was of the opinion that sophisticated filming techniques such as panning, flash-backs, quick cuts, and excessive movement within the frame confused uneducated Africans. He doubted the effectiveness of instructional films that use many props and characters to the uneducated African audience and also felt uneducated Africans lack the imagination to view scenes that are unfamiliar to them, reasoning that since films project an incomplete picture, the uneducated Africans have a hard time filling the missing spots. In addition, he questioned whether uneducated Africans can understand two dimensional images and abstract ideas. His solution to his assumptions was using technique that showed unsophisticated moving pictures with repetitive shots and limited characters and with great focus on realistic settings and plots. Sellers ideas dominated the CFU until the early 1950s, when challenges were raised by some colonial officers and researchers such Morton Williams whose government sponsored research findings went against many of Sellers assumptions. In recent years, Sellers had been described by some critics of having outdated evolutionary notions of race.

One of the prominent plots in Sellers' health films was a contrast between two brothers or friends. One brother will be wise and the other will be foolish. The foolish brother will be shown contracting illness due to negligence or moral falling while the wise and knowledgeable brother who has embraced nontraditional health methods is healthy and comes to the rescue of the foolish brother. Most times, the wise brother depicts the colonial assumption of modernity and healthy choices while the foolish brother embraces traditional medicine.

== Sources ==
- Reynolds, Glenn (2005). Image and Empire: Cinema, Race and the Rise of Mass Black Spectatorship In Southern Africa, 1920-1940 (Thesis). Stony Brook University.
- Larkin, Brian (2008). Signal and noise : media, infrastructure, and urban culture in Nigeria. Durham: Duke University Press.
- Burns, James (1998). Cinema and Empire in Colonial Zimbabwe (Thesis). UC Santa Barbara.
