= Lennie Little-White =

Jamaican film-maker and television producer

Lennie Little-White CD
- Born: Leonard Little-White; St James, Colony of Jamaica, British Empire
- Education: Ryerson Polytechnic University; Northwestern University
- Occupations: Film-maker; television producer; businessman; writer
- Relatives: Heather Little-White (sister); Jimmy Cliff (cousin)

Leonard Little-White CD is a Jamaican film-maker, television producer, businessman and writer based in Saint Ann. He is best known for the soap opera Royal Palm Estate (1994–present) and as the director of the film Children of Babylon (1980).

== Early life and education ==
Little-White was born in Saint James, Jamaica. His father was Leonard White; his mother, Rubertha (née Little), was a Garveyist and a teacher at Somerton Primary School. She educated P. J. Patterson, a future prime minister, as well as Little-White's cousin, the reggae singer Jimmy Cliff. Little-White and his sister, Heather, were raised in Somerton, near Montego Bay, and attended until the age of nine at the All-Age School. Little-White was then educated locally at Cornwall College before going on to attend Jamaica College in Kingston. Subsequently, he studied film at Ryerson Polytechnic University (now Toronto Metropolitan University) in Canada and Northwestern University in Illinois, United States.

== Career ==
=== Film and television ===
Little-White wrote, produced and directed the film Children of Babylon (1980), starring Bob Andy and Leonie Forbes, as well as directed Glory to Gloriana (2006). He is also the director and cinematographer for three documentary films, They Call Me Barrington (2015), which took as its subject the Jamaican painter Barrington Watson, Rex — The Renaissance Man (2014) and Long Live the King (2013), the latter two which on the academic and choreographer Rex Nettleford. Little-White made the biographical film Break Every Rule (2019), depicting the former prime minister Portia Simpson-Miller.

He is also the executive producer of Royal Palm Estate (1994–present) and its spin-off The Blackburns of Royal Palm Estate, popular soap operas on CVM Television, produced by Little-White's company Mediamix. Little-White was the first black Jamaican to own a private film production house.

=== Tourism ===
In 2007, Little-White opened his immersive educational and tourism experience at Coopers Hill, Trelawny. The Outameni Experience is designed around six 'villages', depicting different periods and their associated ethnic contributions to Jamaica's demographic constitution. One walks through these villages over the course of around 90 minutes. Depicted are the Taíno, Spanish, African, British, Indian and Chinese populations of Jamaica. The Experience is named after Jamaica's national motto since 1962: 'Out of Many, One People'. Little-White was inspired to undertake the venture after seeing depictions of national history during shooting for Royal Palm Estate in Cuba between 2002 and 2003. When the Outameni Experience opened, it proved very popular with native Jamaicans, particularly schoolchildren and families.

Due to hurricanes making neighbouring port of Falmouth unserviceable and the devaluation of the Jamaican dollar, particularly in relation to the U.S. dollar, the Experience became unprofitable. Little-White personally invested a further $100 million, sourced from personal loans and by selling his property, into the project but to little success.

Around 2014, the property on which the Outameni Experience was located was acquired by the government-managed National Housing Trust (NHT) for $180 million, triggering a national controversy that saw seven of the NHT's board of directors resign. Many were critical of the NHT's acquisition of the property for such a large sum at a time when affordable housing was scarce.

=== As a writer ===
In 2019, Little-White was hospitalised with partial facial muscle paralysis, for which he underwent neurosurgery. On the advice of the psychiatrist Freddie Hickling, he was recommended to write in order to restore his mental focus during recovery from his operation. From these writings, Little-White compiled his first book, Pathways (published independently in 2025 and introduced by Patterson). The book also includes photographs taken by Little-White near his home in Saint Ann.

== Doctor Bird Awards ==
In 1998, Little-White founded the Doctor Bird Awards, intending for them to serve as the Jamaican equivalent of an American or British Academy Award, dedicated to members of the Jamaican film industry. In 2018, the Awards were rededicated to include other creative industries. Recipients have included Carey Robinson, Franklyn St Juste, Evan Jones, Martin Rennalls, and Chris Blackwell.

== Honours ==
In 2006, Little-White was appointed to the Order of Distinction, with the rank of Commander, by the Jamaican government. The Lennie Little-White Award for Best Local Film, presented by GATFFEST Film Festival, affiliated with the University of the West Indies, is named in his honour.
