= William Sellers (disambiguation) =

William Sellers (1824–1905) was an American engineer and inventor.

William Sellers may also refer to:

- William Sellers (colonial officer), British officer in Nigeria
- William D. Sellers (1928–2014), American meteorologist and climatologist
- William W. Sellers (born 1968), president of Wentworth Military Academy and College in Lexington, Missouri
- Will Sellers (born 1963), associate justice of the Supreme Court of Alabama

== See also ==
- William Sellars (disambiguation)
- William Seller (1797–1869), Scottish physician and botanist
