= The Traitor Within (1923 film) =

1923 film

The Traitor Within is a 1923 film promoting the Ku Klux Klan. The Toll of Justice was another Klan film made the same year.

The films succeeded the popular and influential 1915 D. W. Griffith film The Birth of a Nation. British film studies scholar and author Tom Rice wrote about the film in his book White Robes, Silver Screens: Movies and the Making of the Ku Klux Klan (2015).
