= Production Engineering Research Association of Great Britain =

Production research organisation in the UK

- Formation: 13 June 1946; 80 years ago
- Location: Pera Business Park, Melton Mowbray, Leicestershire
- Region served: Worldwide

The Production Engineering Research Association of Great Britain (PERA) was a research organisation that studied and advanced manufacturing.

== History ==
The Production Engineering Research Association of Great Britain (PERA) was established on 13 June 1946. Dr Donald Frederick Galloway, who involved in the Association's formation, became its first director. From the onset of operations, PERA's purpose of promoting research and technological development that would benefit the manufacturing industries, both generally and in more targets terms, often favouring those processes that generate a phyically tangible end-product. In terms of its organisation, the Association was structured as a membership-based company that was limited by guarantee.

By December 1959, construction work was underway on a new building for demonstration of new production engineering techniques; it was funded both by the Department of Scientific and Industrial Research (DSIR) and from industry sources. During the late 1960s, PERA operated seven custom-built mobile cinemas that toured the UK as part of efforts to promote modern production techniques to British industry.

Amongst other topics of research, PERA performed numerous in-depth studies of the nature of machine tools and their control systems. One area of particular attention for the Association was the materials and production processes related to the automotive industry. By the mid-1960s, PERA was actively encouraging computer-based research. It also examined international innovations in production. However, there were some noted difficulties in the dissemination of the results of research projects undertaken by PERA to the various engineering firms across the nation.

Throughout its existence, PERA frequently provided support to various manufacturing companies, typically to develop new strategies and the refinement of new production techniques. The association also typically conducted its research activities via partnerships with other institutes, startups, often university-based spin-offs; often, PERA's role is to finance envisioned improvements through to fruition. To this end, PERA has had some involvement in the targeted investment partnership Kappika Ventures LLP, which focuses on British technology opportunities, and the AIRTO Venturing Group, which focuses on early-stage innovation finance. It has also undertaken the provision of premises and training, and coordinated patents.
