= Carey Robinson =

Carey Robinson may refer to:

- Carey Robinson (American football), American football player and coach
- Carey Robinson (broadcaster), Jamaican broadcaster, film-maker and writer
