= Doctor Bird Awards =

Jamaican award for achievement in the arts

- Country: Jamaica
- Presented by: Mediamix
- First award: 10 November 1998; 28 years ago

The Doctor Bird Awards (officially the Mediamix Doctor Bird Awards) is a Jamaican award for creative achievement. Founded in 1998 by the film-maker Lennie Little-White, the Doctor Bird Awards originally honoured members of the Jamaican film industry, comparable to an American or British Academy Award. After a hiatus between 2004 and 2018, the award was rededicated to include other creative industries, such as music and visual art.

The Awards are named for Jamaica's national bird, Trochilus polytmus (often called the doctor bird or red-billed streamertail).

== Recipients ==
Including but not limited to:

Name and profession	Year	Ref.
Wycliffe Bennett, producer	1998	
Chris Blackwell, producer	1998	
Gussie Clarke, producer	2018	
Jimmy Cliff, reggae singer and actor	1998	
Basil Dawkins, playwright	2018	
Bill Edwards, designer	2018	
Leonie Forbes, actress and broadcaster	1998	
Perry Henzell, film-maker	1998	
Evan Jones, screenwriter, poet, playwright and novelist	1998	
Mutabaruka, dub poet	2018	
Ian Randle, publisher	2018	
Lloyd Reckord, actor and director	1998	
Martin Rennalls, film-maker	1998	
Trevor Rhone, screenwriter	1998	
Carey Robinson, broadcaster and historian	1998	
Norma Rodney-Harrack, ceramic artist	2018	
Sheryl Lee Ralph, actress and singer	1998	
Oliver Samuels, comedian and actor	1998	
L'Antoinette Stines, director, choreographer and writer	2018	
Franklyn St Juste, film-maker	1998	
Natalie Thompson, film-maker	2018	
Evan Williams, architect	2018	

== See also ==
- Calabash International Literary Festival
