= Barrington Watson =

Jamaican painter (1931–2016)

Barrington Watson CD
- Watson in 1967 at his Eastwood Park studio
- Born: Basil Barrington Watson; January 9, 1931; Lucea, Hanover, Colony of Jamaica, British Empire
- Died: January 26, 2016 (aged 85)
- Known for: Painting
- Notable work: The Maroon Dance; Washer Woman; Mother and Child; Conversation; Famous People: Samuel Sharpe; Bob Marley
- Movement: Social Realism
- Children: Basil Watson

Basil Barrington Watson CD (9 January 1931 – 26 January 2016) was a Jamaican painter.

== Biography ==
Born in 1931 January 9 in Lucea, Barrington Watson made his original mark in Jamaica as a football player for Kingston College. However, he ultimately followed his artistic yearnings by enrolling at the Royal College of Art in London at the age of 20. Watson also studied at Académie de la Grande Chaumière in Paris and the Rijksacademie in Amsterdam. He travelled widely and then returned to the first Director of Studies at the Jamaica School of Art and co-founded the Contemporary Jamaican Artists' Association (1964–74). He later served as visiting professor at Spelman College, Atlanta. In 1967 he won a prize at the first Spanish Biennale at Barcelona. In 2000 he was awarded a Gold Musgrave Medal by the Institute of Jamaica.

Watson has exhibited throughout Jamaica and internationally. He is the father of sculptors Basil Watson and Raymond Watson. Watson is the subject of Lennie Little-White's 2015 documentary film They Call Me Barrington. He died on 26 January 2016 at the age of 85.
