= American Black Film Festival =

Annual film festival held in Los Angeles

- Location: Los Angeles, U.S.
- Founded: 1997
- Founded by: Jeff Friday
- Most recent: May 27-31, 2026
- Festival date: May 20-23, 2027
- Language: English
- Website: www.abff.com

The American Black Film Festival (ABFF), originally called the Acalpulco Black Film Festival, is an independent Oscar-qualifying film festival that focuses primarily on black film and works by black members of the film industry. The festival is held annually in Miami, Florida and features films, documentaries, and web series with black writers, directors, and actors.

In 2027 it will move to Los Angeles and will be held from May 20 to 23, 2027. Kerry Washington will serve as ambassador of the festival.

== History ==
=== Founding: "Because Hollywouldn't" ===
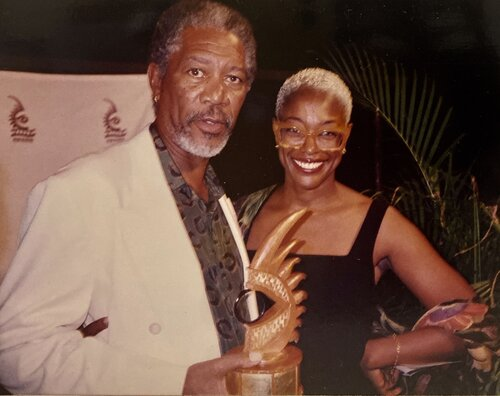
Cheryl R. Riley poses with Morgan Freeman at the 1997 Acalpuco Black Film Festival holding the award she designed.

The first Acapulco Black Film Festival was held in June 1997. The aim of its founders, Jeff Friday, Byron E. Lewis and Warrington Hudlin, was to create a venue at which members of "Black Hollywood" could meet, network, collaborate, and celebrate black cinema. In an interview, Friday said that one of the main motivations for the festival was that "[a]ll minorities are shut down from the private party we call Hollywood. We are let in one at a time, and the masses don't get the information, or don't have access to the decision making, or are not in a position to green-light a project. What we have plan[ned] is more of the same, which is more information, more network opportunities, and to further our mission to provide minorities and people of color with a fair shot at breaking into the Hollywood system."

Lewis, CEO of UniWorld Group, and Friday, then-president of UniWorld’s film division, met with Hudlin, then-president of the Black Filmmakers Foundation, to speak about the Rev. Jesse Jackson’s call to boycott the Oscars as a result of the lack of Black nominees that year. The Oscars had historically had a reputation for leaving out Black members of cinema; until 1980, only two African-Americans had won Academy Awards for acting. The founders of the ABFF decided, though, that rather than investing time and energy in supporting a boycott, they would hold an event of their own to celebrate black cinematic achievements, and thus the festival was born.

=== Acapulco Black Film Festival: 1997-2001 ===
In its first years, the festival was held in Acapulco, Mexico. The first festival had a turnout of about 600. Over five days, nine independent films were screened and seven awards were given.

In 1998, HBO established the HBO Short Film Award to be presented at the ABFF to honor works in the genre of short film. HBO thus became a major partner and supporter of the ABFF, along with UniWorld and the Black Filmmakers Foundation. 1999 saw the festival’s first Trailblazer award for significant contributions to Black screen media. This award would remain a consistent part of the festival until 2002. In 2000, the Lincoln Filmmaker’s Trophy was established. This award was one of only two honors, along with the HBO Short Film Award, that would survive the festival’s move to Florida in 2002.

Early hosts and presenters included Robert Townsend (1997), Denzel Washington (1998), Isaac Hayes (1999 and 2000), and Mari Morrow and Kim Whitley who co-hosted the event in 2001.

Aside from awards, the festival in its early incarnations had seminars, actors’ training workshops and meet-and-greets, all with the aim of strengthening the skills and networks of black filmmakers, actors and actresses, and screenwriters.

=== Changes from 2002-Present ===
The year 2002 saw many changes for the film festival. Jeff Friday took over execution of the festival, which he renamed the American Black Film Festival (also abbreviated as ABFF). The festival was moved to South Beach, Florida.

Since its transformation in 2002, the ABFF has drawn new corporate sponsors (including Grey Goose, Ford, NBC, CBS, and Nickelodeon) and a dramatically increased attendance.

The first Black Movie Awards to be televised were in 2005, with a ceremony hosted by Cedric the Entertainer, which was aired on Turner Network Television; the 2006 ceremony was hosted by Tyler Perry.

The Festival stayed in Florida until 2007 when it was moved to Los Angeles, California, in an effort to attract more celebrity attendees and thereby generating more general interest in the festival. While initially successful, the change in venue ultimately resulted in a decline in attendance from members of the actual Black filmmaking community. The festival changed venues once more in 2010, returning to Florida.

== Festival ==
=== Events ===
Typically, there will be an opening ceremony, either featuring a big-name movie or an award presentation. The following days will include screenings of other films, actors’ and directors’ workshops, and symposiums. Each year, the festival concludes with the main awards ceremony. Hosts of this ceremony have included: Robert Townsend and Shaun Robinson, Anthony Anderson, and Niecy Nash.

=== Programming Initiatives ===
The festival has five objectives, or "Programming Initiatives" which are:

- Education in the form of programs to teach and help develop the skills of African-Americans in film.
- Artistic Expression through screening of African-American films.
- Collaboration between members of the black cinema industry thereby strengthening the industry as a whole.
- Access to "industry insiders" for up-and-coming filmmakers and producers.
- Recognition of outstanding work on the part of Black independent filmmakers.

== Influence ==
Numerous Hollywood insiders, including director Antoine Fuqua (Director of ‘’Training Day’’) and Charlie Jordan Brookins of MTV Films have endorsed the festival, as well as rapper/actor Common who has stated that, "[I]t’s a good vehicle to get out great art that we... want the world to see."
