= Heather Little-White =

Jamaican nutritionist and disabilities activist (1952–2013)

Heather Little-White OD
- Born: Heather Edecca Little-White; 8 May 1952; Somerton, St James, Colony of Jamaica, British Empire
- Died: 22 January 2013 (aged 60); Kingston, Jamaica
- Occupations: Nutritionist, journalist, disabilities activist
- Years active: 1973–2013
- Relatives: Lennie Little-White (brother); Jimmy Cliff (cousin)

Heather Edecca Little-White OD (8 May 1952 – 22 January 2013) was a Jamaican nutritionist, journalist and disabilities activist. After earning degrees in nutrition and communication, she worked with Grace Kitchens and founded the television programme Creative Cooking to share sound nutritional advice throughout the country. As a journalist, besides writing articles on nutrition, she wrote a weekly column on sexuality for the Outlook Magazine segment of The Gleaner newspaper. After working with the Reggae Boyz, Jamaica's national football team, as a nutrition consultant, Little-White became paralyzed from the waist down after being shot during a robbery attempt. Becoming an advocate for people with disabilities, she focused on bringing awareness, accessibility, and assistance to Jamaicans living with disabilities. She was honored as an officer in the Order of Distinction in 2001.

== Early life ==
Heather Edecca Little-White was born on 8 May 1952 in Somerton, Saint James Parish, Jamaica, to Rubertha (née Little) and Leonard White. She and her brother, Lennie were raised in Somerton and she attended the All-Age School until the age of nine. Completing her primary schooling at Montego Bay School for Girls, she attended St. Hilda's High School in Brown's Town. In 1970, Little-White enrolled in a course on institutional management at the College of Arts Science and Technology, graduating in 1972.

== Career ==
Over the next six years, Little-White held a variety of jobs, including working at a children's hospital as a dietitian's assistant, at two secondary schools in the home economics department, and as a journalist for The Gleaner. In 1978, she moved to the United States and completed a B.S. in nutrition and a master's degree in communication at the University of Wisconsin–Stout. She returned to Jamaica in 1981 and began working at Grace Kennedy and Company Limited in the marketing department. By 1984, Little-White was working as Grace's nutrition promotion manager and began developing educational initiatives on ways to improve the nutrition of women and children. One of those programmes was the development of the first television programme devoted to nutritional advice, called Creative Cooking. The show became a staple of Grace's marketing plan and their flagship programme, airing for decades and teaching cooks how to affordably prepare nutritious meals.

After almost a decade at Grace, Little-White returned to school in 1988 to complete a research project and her PhD at Cornell University in Ithaca, New York, examining the intersections on gender and nutritional education. When she returned from the United States in 1992, she began working with the School Feeding Programme, the Urban Development Corporation, and several United Nations programmes, as a consultant. In 1997, she began lecturing at the University of Technology and the following year worked as a consultant on the nutrition plans for the Reggae Boyz, Jamaica's national football team, on journey to the World Cup competition in France.

In 1999, Little-White was shot during an attempted carjacking in Saint Andrew Parish, when two gunmen tried to steal her car. She was flown to Jackson Memorial Hospital in Miami, Florida after discovering that the bullet which entered her shoulder was lodged in her spine, paralyzing the lower part of her body. After her recovery, Little-White returned to Jamaica becoming an advocate for the rights of people with disabilities. In 2001, Little-White was awarded the Order of Distinction for her work in educating Jamaicans about nutrition.

Little-White focused on outreach programmes to increase awareness, accessibility, and assistance for Jamaicans with disabilities in her later years. She ran a consulting firm providing life skills as well as nutritional advice and wrote a weekly column for The Gleaner newspaper's Outlook Magazine, which openly covered a variety of topics on sexuality. Continuing her lecturing at the School of Hospitality for the University of Technology, she also founded a programme to teach domestic skills to sex workers to help those who wanted to transition out of the industry develop marketable alternative skills.

== Death and legacy ==
Little-White died on 22 January 2013 at the Kingston Public Hospital after a four-month illness. The Jamaica Household Worker's Union gives an annual award bearing her name to acknowledge the public service contributions made by domestic workers.
