= L'Antoinette Stines =

Jamaican director, choreographer, author, actor and dancer (born 1951)

Lenora Antoinette Stines CD (born September 5, 1951), better known as L'Antoinette Ọṣun AwadeWemo Stines is a Jamaican director, choreographer, author, actor and dancer. She is the founder and artistic director of L'Acadco: A United Caribbean Dance Force, an industry-leading contemporary dance company based in Jamaica. Stines is also the creator of the first Anglo Caribbean Modern Contemporary training procedure called L'Antech. L'Antech is an eclectic Caribbean contemporary technique (CARIMOD) that synthesizes African influences, Caribbean folklore, and is dominated by Jamaican Afro-Caribbean forms.

L'Antoinette Stines holds a Ph.D. from the University of the West Indies (2010) Mona Campus in Kingston, Jamaica in Cultural Studies. Stines is especially acclaimed for her work as a choreographer, technique professor and teacher. She lectures internationally on the traditional dance forms such as Kumina, Bruckins, Nyabinghi, Dancehall and the contemporary dance synthesis L'Antech.

== Career ==
In 1978, Dr. L'Antionette Stines founded Miami's first primarily black dance company, L'Acadco, with a vision of bringing together the tri-ethnic communities of Hispanics, African-American and Caucasian. Returning to Jamaica in 1982, L'Acadco was reborn with a different intention to present contemporary dance with a new voice, fresh and valid interpretations of the Jamaican landscape. Stines was the first choreographer to showcase Dancehall on a proscenium stage at the Little Theatre in Kingston, Jamaica in her renowned piece called "Bouyaka Bouyaka" (1984). Stines is also the first artistic director in Jamaica to fight the cause for payment of dancers.

Stines released her first book, Soul Casings, on 5 July 2014. Soul Casings introduces L'Antech, the Anglophone Caribbean's first CARIMOD dance technique. The book is specifically designed as an introductory text explaining the path towards the philosophies underpinning the creation of the technique. Soul Casings was launched at the Philip Sherlock Center for the Creative Arts on the Mona Campus. Stines describes the title of the book as "I see the body as an encasement of the soul, and unless you engage the soul when you dance, then you are really just doing something else other than dancing", reported by the Jamaica Observer.

Stines was the Director of Movement/Lead Choreographer for ICC Cricket World Cup Opening Ceremony- Jamaica (2007). Assistant Artistic Director for CARIFESTA XII- Haiti (2015). Stines was nominated for the Dora Mavor Moore Award (2018) in Toronto, Canada for Outstanding Choreography for the Watah Theatre production "Lukumi: A Dub Opera"

Stines is also an actor, known for Luke Cage (2018), a Netflix series based on a Marvel Comics character, and Dancehall Is Us (2016). Dancehall Is Us is a 20-minute documentary about the culture of dance and musical traditions of Jamaica director and written by Egor Papulov. The film is a study of the nature of style dancehall, roots, street culture and style of life of the citizens brings the viewer to understand the country as a whole. The film is, in a sense, a portrait of Jamaica today. Dancehall Is Us has won the following awards: Best Shot at the Bellingham Music Film Festival (2016), Best Documentary at the Portobello Film Festival, Best Short at Rubber International Festival of Music on Cinema, Winner of Best Editing of a Documentary Award at TTMFF To Tylko Montaz Film Festival (2016) and Best International Short Documentary at Film Internacional de Cortometrajes Libelula Dorado and has been nominated for many others.Stines was the choreographer for the iconic Jamican film "Dancehall Queen" (1997) And was also the choreographer for the film "baby mother" produced in England.

== L'Antech ==
L'Antech is the shortened word L'Anyah CARIMOD Technique. Included in L'Antech is Kumina, Bruckins, Nyahbinghi, Arara, Bambosh, Classical Ballet and Daaance-all to name a few. In L'Antech, Daaance becomes a viable tool enabling reconstruction, nation building and understanding of identity specificity.

== Filmography ==
- Babymother (1998), choreographer
- Dancehall Queen (1997), choreographer
- Luke Cage, Season 2 Episode 11 (2017–2018), actor and consultant

== Publications ==
- Kumina to L'Antech: An overview of the Anglo-Caribbean Contemporary Carimod Dance Technique, 2015
- From Dance to Daance: Embracing Ancestral Riddims in Creolisation in Dance, edited by Pawlette Brooks, Leicester, United Kingdom, 2015
- Ruckumbine! Jamaican Body Memories in Jamaica Land We Love: A Post- Independence Legacy of Nation Building, Edited by Elaine L. Duval, Zebulon House Publishers, 2014
- Soul Casings: A journey from Classical Ballet to the Carimod Dance Technique L’Antech, 2014
- The Politics of the Visual and the Vocal: Claiming Naming: Researching Naming in Caribbean Dance through the Paradigm of L’Antech, Caribbean Intransit, 2011
- 'Critique of Rex Nettleford's "Dance Jamaica Dance"' in Kaieteur New Arts Column/The Arts Forum and The Arts Journal, vol. 6, no. 1/2, 2010
- 'Does the Caribbean Body Dance or Daaance? An Exploration of Modern Contemporary Dance From Caribbean Perspectives', Caribbean Quarterly, vol. 51, no. 3/4, 2005
- The Emancipation Story Through The History Of Dance: The Boulevard Baptist Church, 2025

== Honours and awards ==
- 2025: Order of Distinction, Commander Class.
- 2023: Musgrave Medel in silver
- 2023: Actor Boy Award for L'Acadco 40th season of dance "Kalunga"
- 2018: RJR/Gleaner Communications Group's Arts and Culture award to L'Acadco for its role in promoting Caribbean culture on the world stage
- 2018: QRIHC queen of reggae award for excellence in dance
- 2018: The Doctor Bird Award for dance
- 2015: Jamaica Dance Umbrella, Citation for Recognition of Outstanding Contributions to Dance in Jamaica
- 2014: Literary Festival and Cultural showcase University of Technology Jamaica Award for 30 years of Excellence in Dance, Education and Production and for positioning Traditional Jamaican Dance Forms on the International Stage
- 2013: The Alpha Academy Association • Women of Excellence Award
- 2012: Caymanas Track, Outstanding Contribution to the Creative Arts in dance
- 2012: Dancing Dynamites Competition, Outstanding Contribution to Dance in Jamaica
- 2011: American Chamber of Commerce in Jamaica, The AMCHAM Jamaica Business and Civic Leadership Award
- 2011: Ministry of Information, Culture, Youth and Sport Jamaica, Sterling Contribution to Dance in general and in St. Kitts in particular
- 2003: Alpha Academy, Woman of Excellence Award
- 1994: Brillante Participacion en el Proyecto Cultural del Estado Villahermosa Tobasco
- 1985: London Borough of Lewisham, Governor's Award
- 1981: The Jamaican Cultural and Civic Association of Florida, Outstanding Contribution to the Cultural Arts
