= Martin Rennalls =

Jamaican film-maker and academic (1915–2013)

Martin Rennalls CD
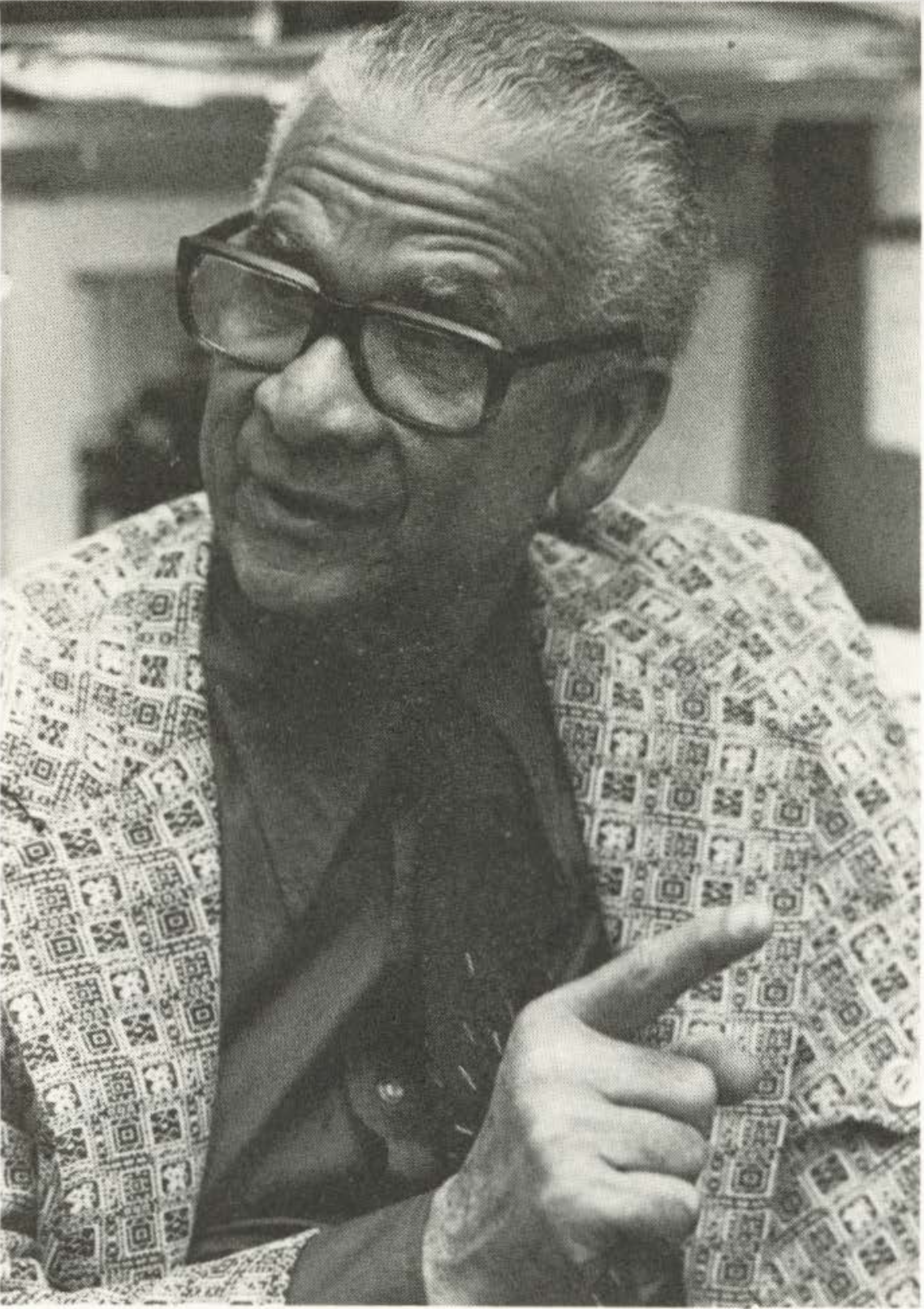
- Rennalls in 1982
- Born: Martin Alexander Rennalls; 17 February 1915; Glengoffe, St Catherine, Colony of Jamaica, British Empire
- Died: 8 March 2013 (aged 98); Hollywood, Florida, U.S.
- Education: Mico Teacher Training College; University of London; Boston University (MSc)
- Occupations: Film-maker; headmaster; educationalist; university professor
- Spouse: Ivy MacDonald
- Children: 1

Martin Alexander Rennalls CD (17 February 1915 – 8 March 2013) was a Jamaican film-maker, headmaster and academic who notably headed the Jamaica Film Unit before becoming a university professor at Rochester Institute of Technology.

== Biography ==
=== 1915–1936: early life and education ===
Martin Alexander Rennalls was born on 17 February 1915 in the hamlet of Glengoffe, in the hills of Saint Catherine, Jamaica, to the planter Albert Rennalls and his wife. He was educated at Grateful Hill School between 1922 and 1933. During this time he would watch silent western films screened by a local businessman once per month; however, Rennalls was motivated to devote himself to film-making by a magic lantern show presented by a missionary group. Rennalls subsequently enrolled in 1933 at Mico Teacher Training College (now Mico University College) in Kingston, training to be a headmaster. He graduated in 1936.

=== 1936–1948: career as a headmaster ===
Rennalls served as headmaster of three rural primary schools, these being Arthur's Seat, Woodside and Belfield. While working in this capacity, he became interested in using films to educate his students. Rennalls built a rear projection screen for the benefit of his students as well as their parents, for whom he programmed educational films in the evenings. In 1948, he was involved in the founding of the Manager-Teachers Association. Rennalls also became an inspector of schools for the colonial government.

=== 1948–1970: Jamaica Film Unit ===
In 1948, Rennalls was given the opportunity to study for a year at the University of London's Institute of Education via a scholarship programme and, after returning to Jamaica, was trained between 1950 and 1951 in the making of films at the West Indies Training School located at University College of the West Indies (now the University of the West Indies, Mona) in a programme established by the Colonial Film Unit (CFU). There, he studied with Milton Weller and Trevor Welsh, both of whom would go on to be frequent collaborators. Finishing this training in 1951, Rennalls served as the first director of the newly-founded Jamaica Film Unit (JFU), under the authority of the wider CFU, as well as an assistant education officer in the Department of Education. He was named executive head of the JFU thereafter.

Under Rennalls's directorship, the Jamaica Film Unit collaborated with the Department of Agriculture, the British Broadcasting Corporation and the Institute of Jamaica. Many films served as educational guides for agricultural techniques. He took additional inspiration from the National Film Board of Canada, learning from them methods of synchronising sound at a low cost through the use of magnetic tape. Rennalls would direct the JFU for a period of 19 years during which time the JFU produced hundreds of films. The JFU later became part of the Jamaica Information Service in 1957, having less autonomy after Jamaica was granted her independence from the British Empire in 1962.

In the late 1960s, Rennalls was offered a scholarship by which he undertook a Master of Science degree in communications with a specialism in film production at Boston University. He submitted the dissertation "Development of the Documentary Film in Jamaica" (1967). He retired from directorship of the Jamaica Film Unit in 1970.

=== 1971–1985: Rochester Institute of Technology ===
In 1971, Rennalls became a faculty member at the Rochester Institute of Technology (RIT) in New York, United States. By 1980, he was an associate professor in the School of Photographic Arts and Sciences, teaching "conceptual film making, straight narrative and dramatic narrative". He also helped develop a programme which aimed to involve computer graphics and animation into film-making at RIT. He was also chairman of the International Students Committee. Rennalls retired as full professor and department chair in 1985.

=== Personal life and death ===
Rennalls married Ivy (née MacDonald), a professor in health nursing at Nazareth College (now Nazareth University). After Rennalls and his wife retired, they moved to Hollywood, Florida. Martin Rennalls died on 8 March 2013. He had one daughter.

== Honours and awards ==
- 1978: Jamaican Film Worker's Guild Award.
- 1982: Eisenhart Outstanding Teaching Award.
- 1991: Order of Distinction (Commander Class).
- 1998: Doctor Bird Award for Lifetime Achievement in Television and Film.

== Select filmography ==
For the Jamaica Film Unit, as producer-director-writer
Year	Title
1951	Farmer Brown Learns Good Dairying
1953	Lets Stop Them
1953	Churchill Visits Jamaica
1953	University College of the West Indies
1953	Together We Build
1955	Princess Margaret Visits Jamaica
1955	Jamaica Welcomes Puerto Rico
1956	It Can Happen to You
1956	Historic Jamaica
1956	Jamaica Celebrates 300 –Highlights of Float, Parade, Beauty Contest, etc.
1956	She Shows the Way
1959	Health Centres
1959	United Nations Day
1961	Government by the People
1962	A Nation is Born
