= Screen Machine =

The Screen Machine is a mobile cinema that operates across the Scottish Highlands and Islands, Western Isles, Argyll & Bute and North Ayrshire. It regularly visits more than 30 rural communities.

== History ==
The original Screen Machine, now named "Screen Machine 1", was a mobile cinema for the Highlands and Islands of Scotland launched in 1998. It consisted of an articulated unit, the trailer of which expanded and unfolded to provide a 102-seat self-contained cinema. In recent years, it stood in for Eden Court's Riverside Theatre in Inverness whilst they were closed for a major refurbishment. The motivation behind the service was simple: to provide small and remote communities with access locally to the same level of cinema experience normally available in large towns.

== Screen Machine: Take Two ==
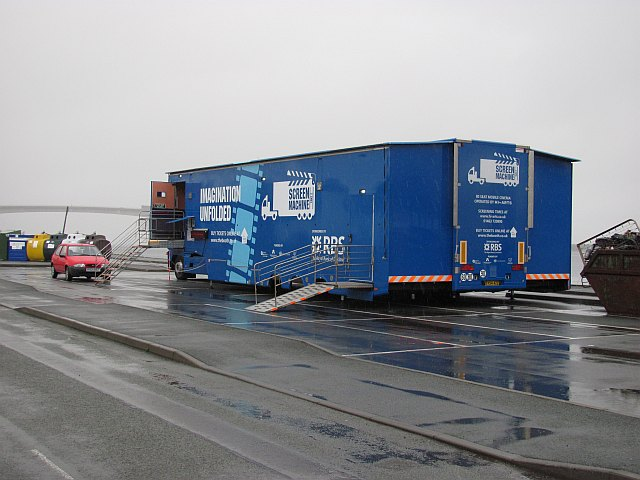
The Screen Machine (Take 2) set up ready for use at Kyleakin, Skye

The Screen Machine: Take Two is a replacement of the original Screen Machine and has been in service since 15 April 2005. It was built by French company ‘Toutenkamion’, who specialise in custom-built vehicles, including mobile recording studios, restaurants and travelling galleries. Toutenkamion mobile cinemas also operate in France, in the Republic of Ireland, and serving British Armed Forces overseas. Screen Machine 2 is a similar concept to the original, however the capacity is reduced to 80 seats. It is fully 3D compatible. It normally takes three different films on each tour, visiting a community for between one and four days, to give approx 8 or more screenings in total. The cinema is operated by one person, who acts as driver, sets up the cinema on site, sells the tickets, and projects the film. The vehicle returned to France at the end of 2016 for a refit, returning to service in June 2017.

== Locations ==
Screen Machine makes regular visits to more than 40 communities with each of its tours lasting around 10 weeks. Currently the machine visits locations including: Lochgilphead, Tarbert, Argyll and Bute, Lochaline, Isle of Arran, Port Ellen, Tobermory, Tighnabruiach, Tarbet, Ullapool, Gairloch, Dornie, Lochcarron and throughout the Outer Hebrides. Screen Machine 2 has also provided projection services to the Celtic Media Festival, in Portree in 2008 and in Caernarfon in 2009.
