= Cheryl R. Riley =

American artist and furniture designer (born 1952)

Cheryl R. Riley (born 1952) is an American artist and furniture designer.

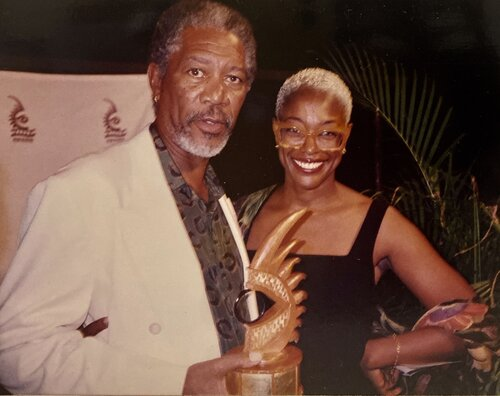
Cheryl R. Riley poses with Morgan Freeman at the 1997 Acalpuco Black Film Festival holding the award she designed

== Career ==
=== Furniture design ===
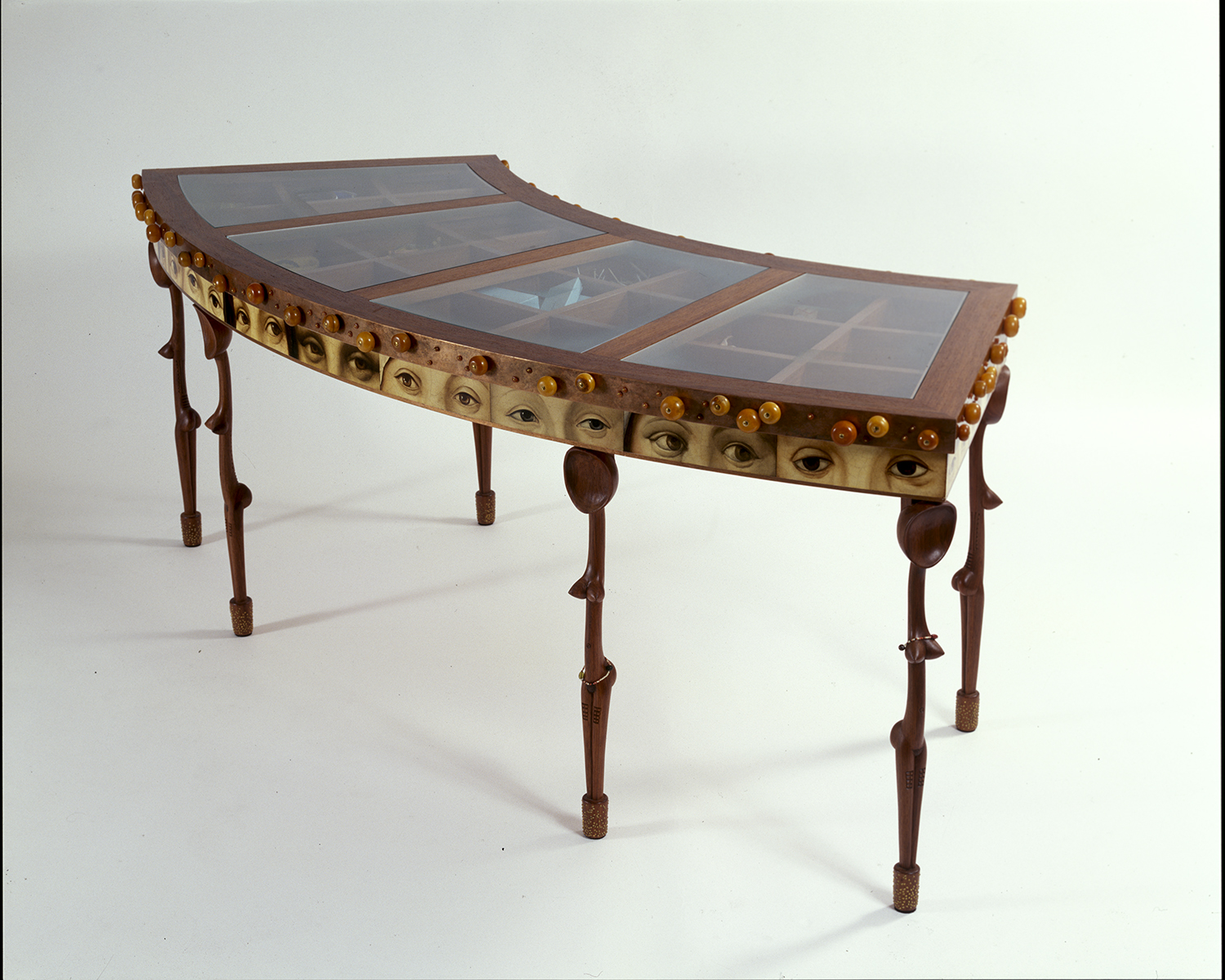
Zulu Renaissance Writing Table for a Lady (1995–96) Commissioned by Curator Aaron Betsky for permanent collection of San Francisco Museum of Modern Art.

Riley pursued a career in advertising and fashion before focusing on furniture design. In 1986, Riley formed Right Angle Designs in San Francisco, starting out by designing and producing furniture. She is said to be one of the only female African American designers to establish a national reputation for her furniture design.

=== Other work ===
The cities of San Francisco, New York, Atlanta, and Sacramento have commissioned Riley for murals and sculptures since the inception of Right Angle Designs. She designed the interior of the public lobby of Bayview Police Station in Bayview-Hunters Point, San Francisco, from 1991 to 1997. In 2000, Riley was hired to design the mural, "MBUTI WOMEN" (2000) in San Francisco, CA Bayview District.

Riley was commissioned to design the awards statue for the American Black Film Festival (then called the Acapulco Black Film Festival Awards). In 2019, the award was acquired by the Smithsonian's National Museum of African American History and Culture for their permanent collection.

== Gallery ==
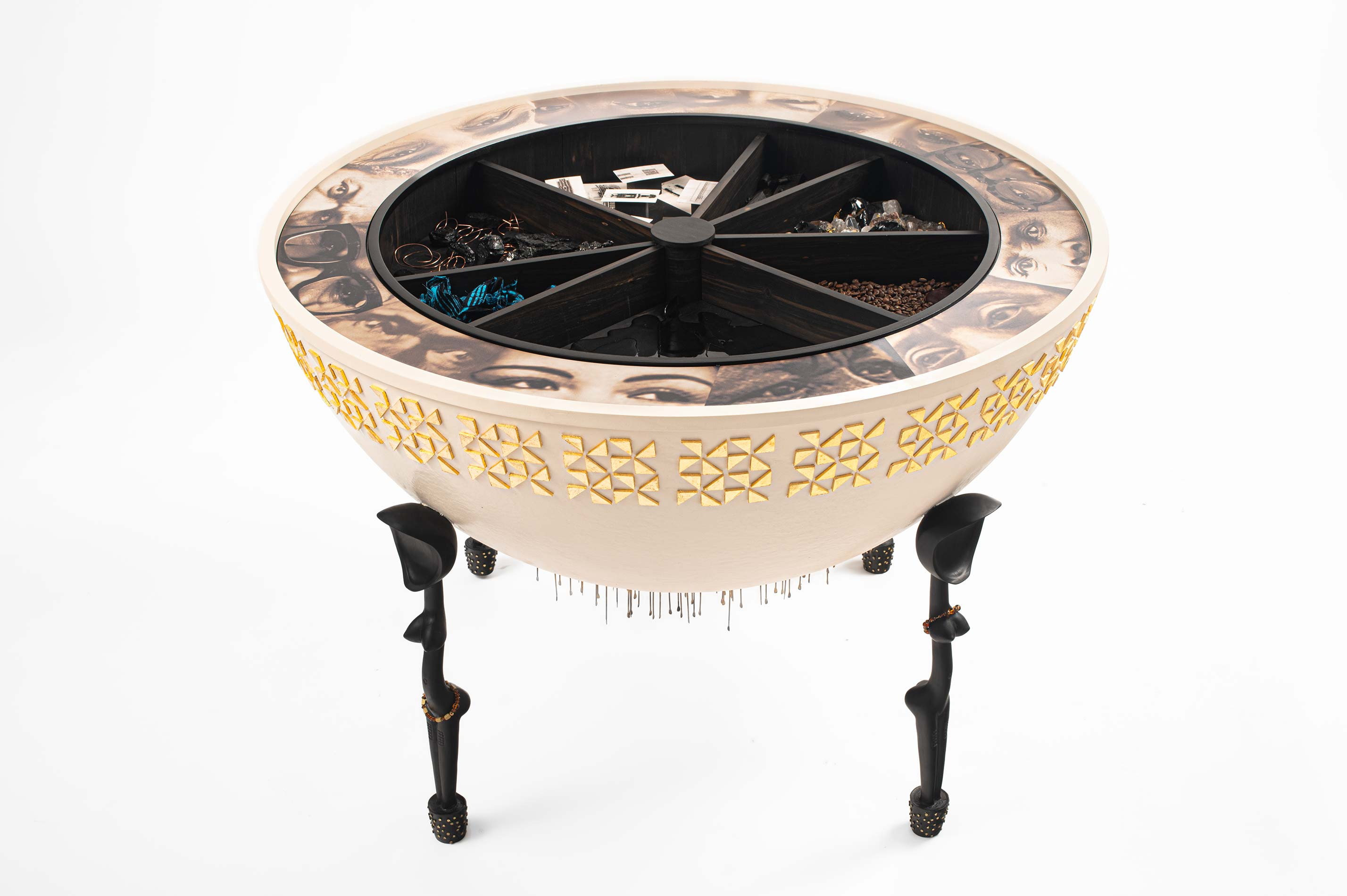
World History I (Drum), (2023) – Permanent Collection Commission, Brooklyn Museum

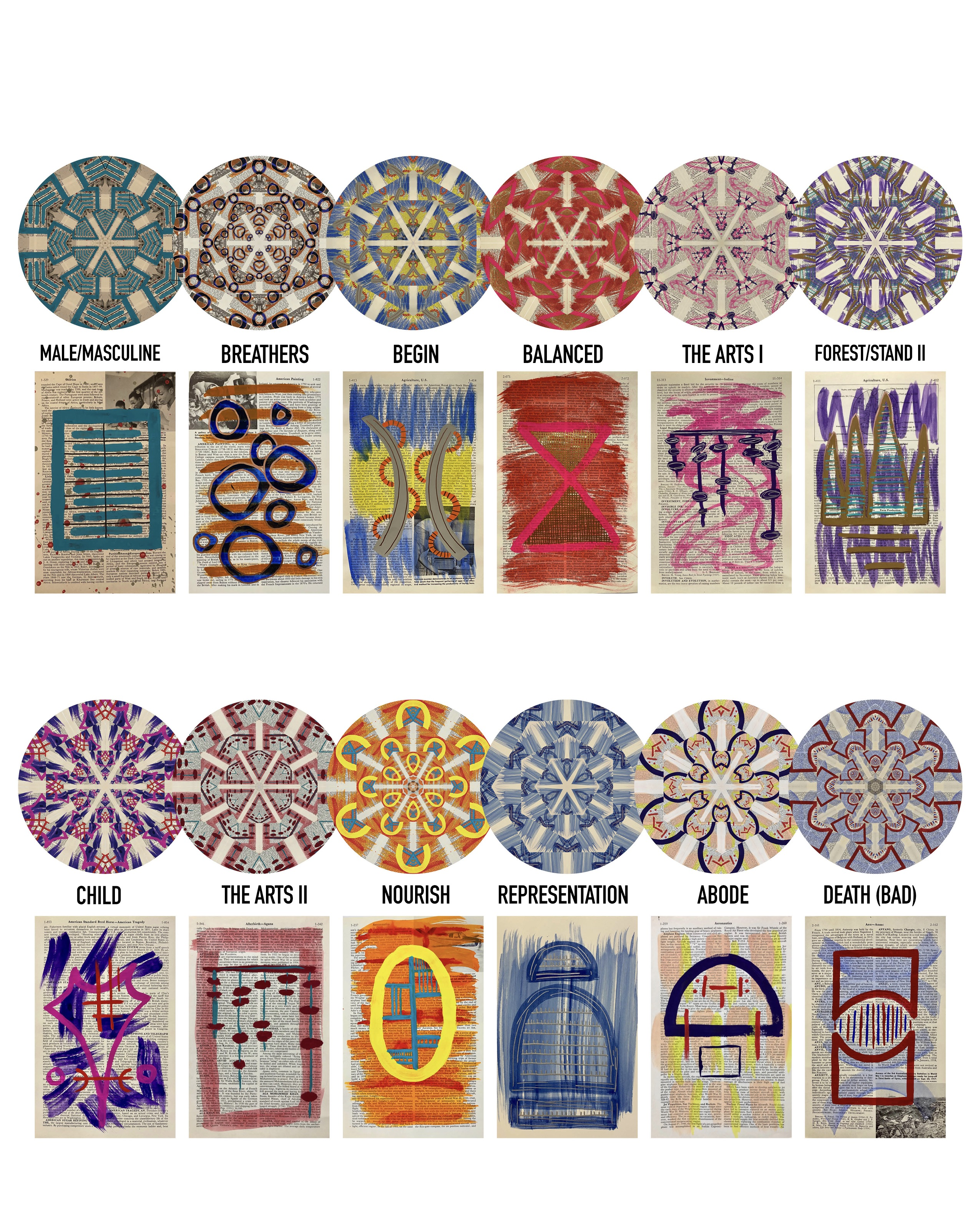
“Kaleidoscopes” (24”X 24")

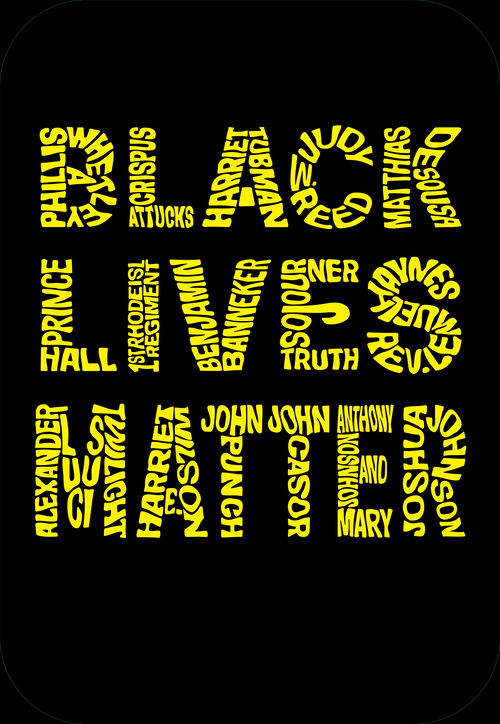
"Black Lives Have Mattered" (2020)

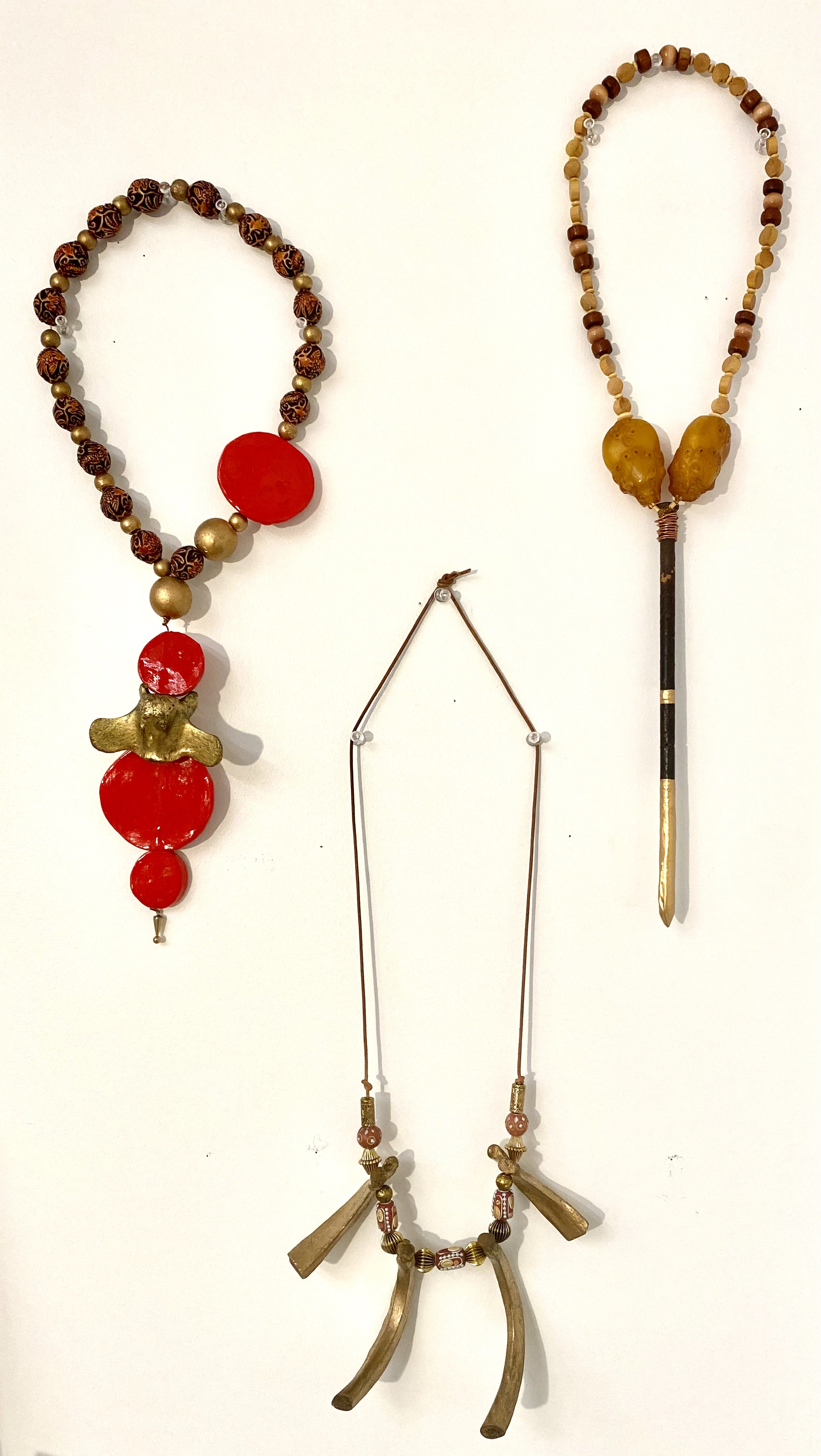
Sculptures in the Form of a Necklaces (2019) - Museum of Arts & Design (MAD), New York, NY

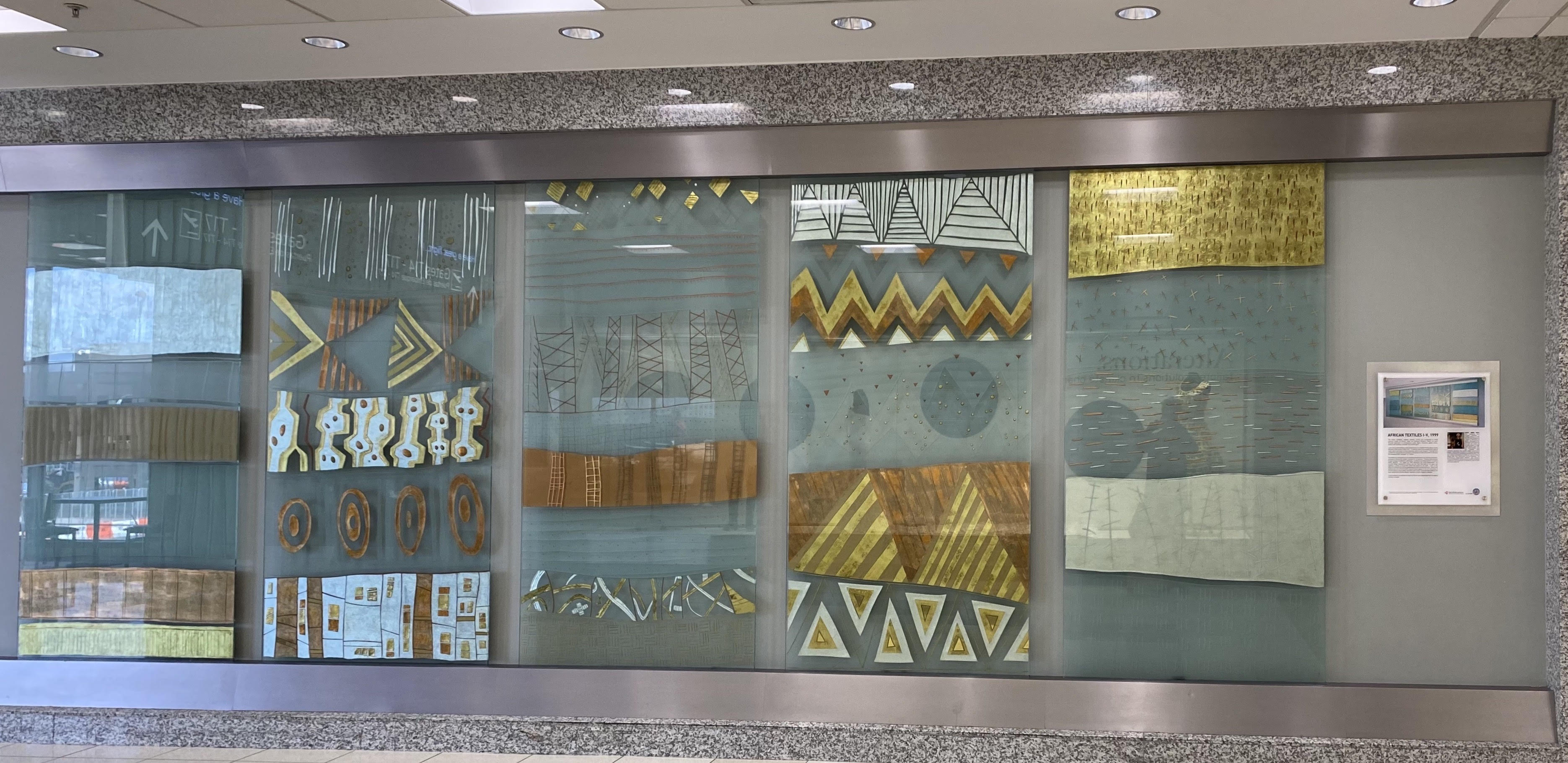
African Textiles Glass Panels I-V, (1999) Hartsfield-Jackson Atlanta International Airport, Terminal T.

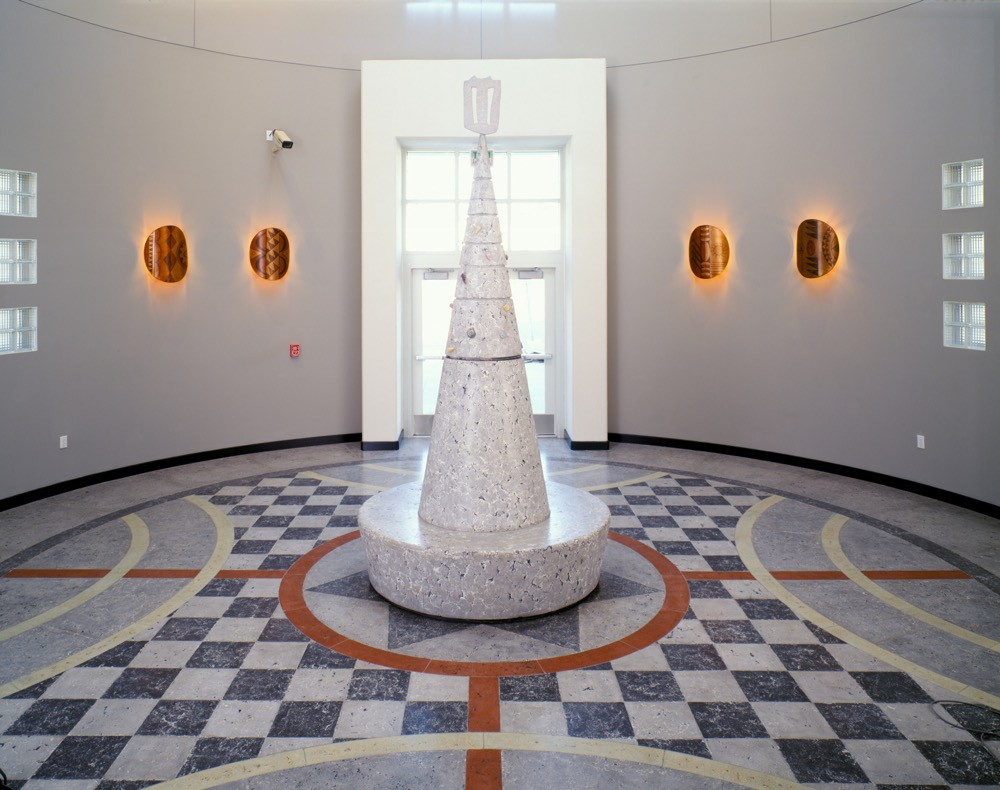
Bayview Police Station Lobby (1991–1997) - Bayview Police Station, San Francisco, CA

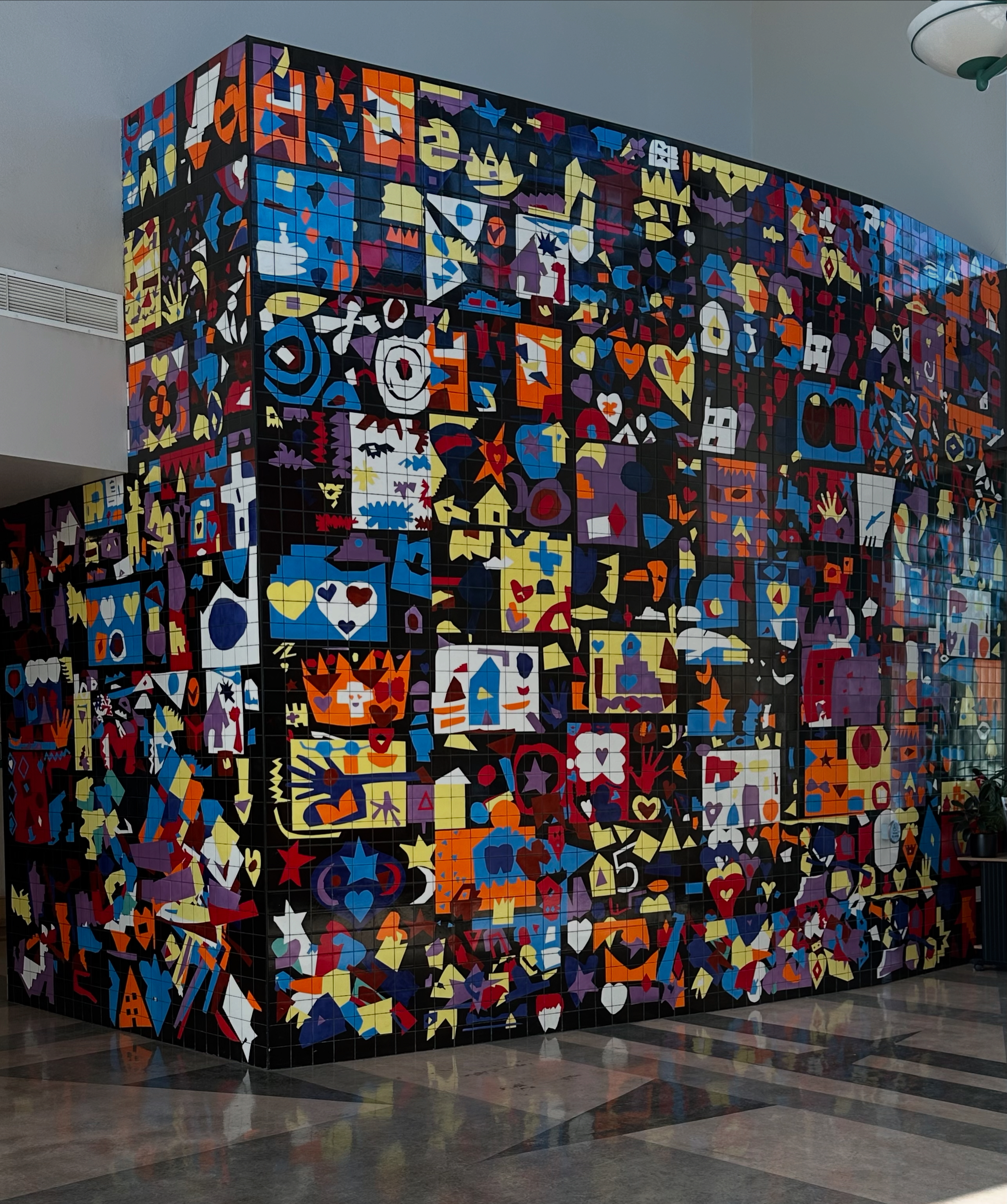
Pannell Meadowview Community Center, "Meadowview Joyful" (1995) - Pannell Meadowview Community Center, "Meadowview Joyful" (1995)

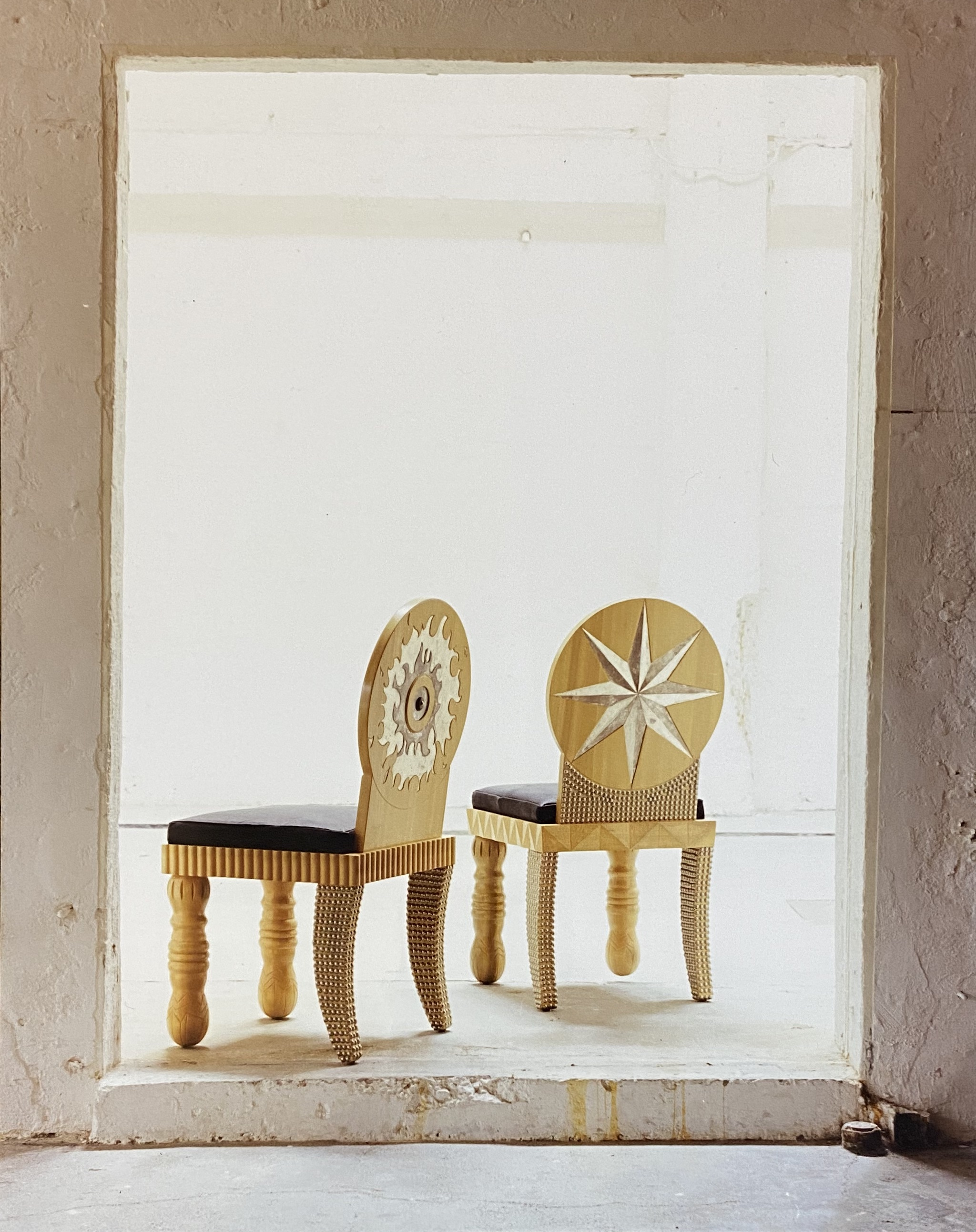
Sunburst and Starburst Dining Chairs (1994) - Oakland Museum, Oakland, CA

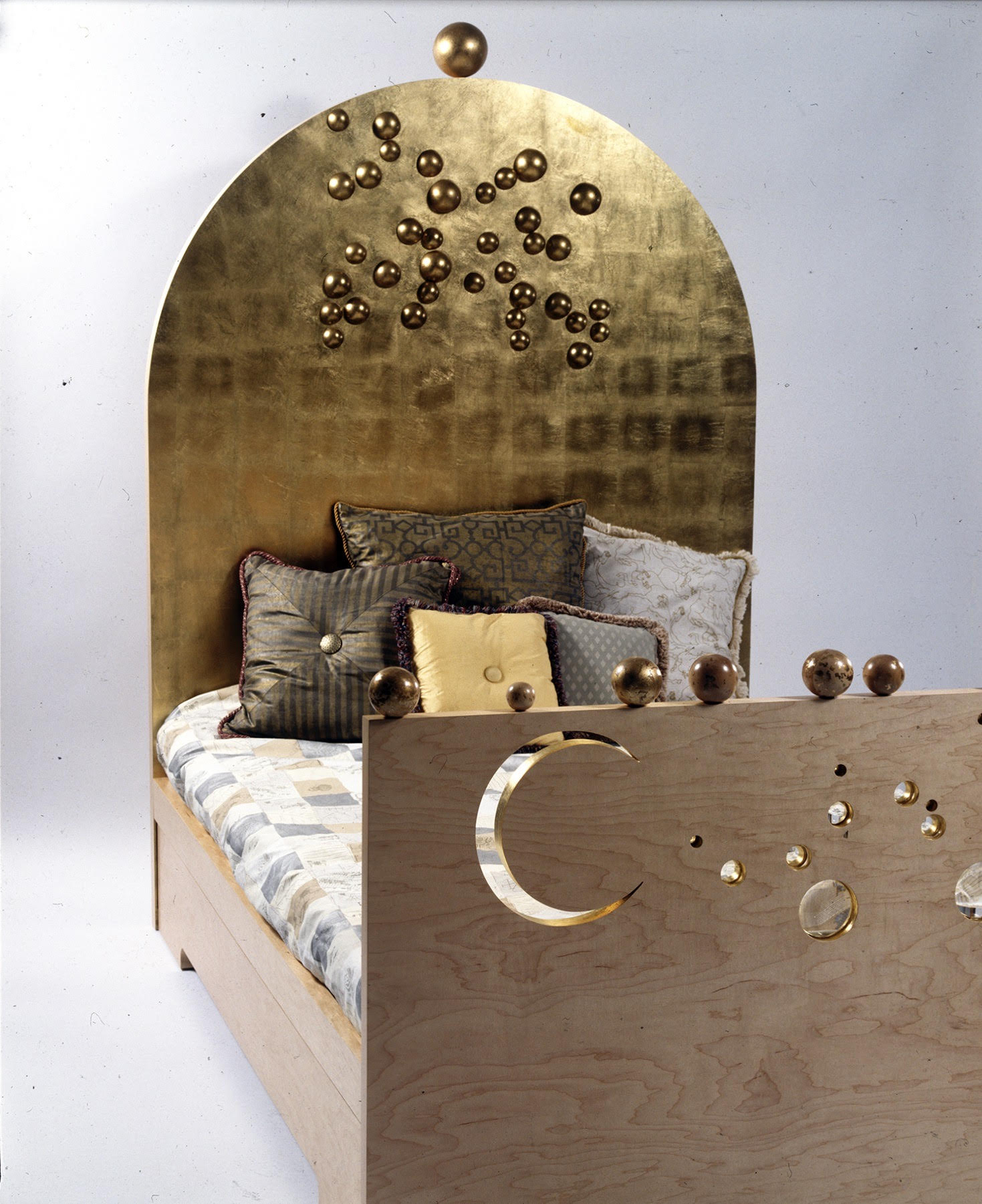
Constellation Bed (1994) – San Francisco Museum of Modern Art (SFMOMA), on loan for FOG Design+Art (2024–2025), curated by Key Jo Lee, Chief Curator at MOAD

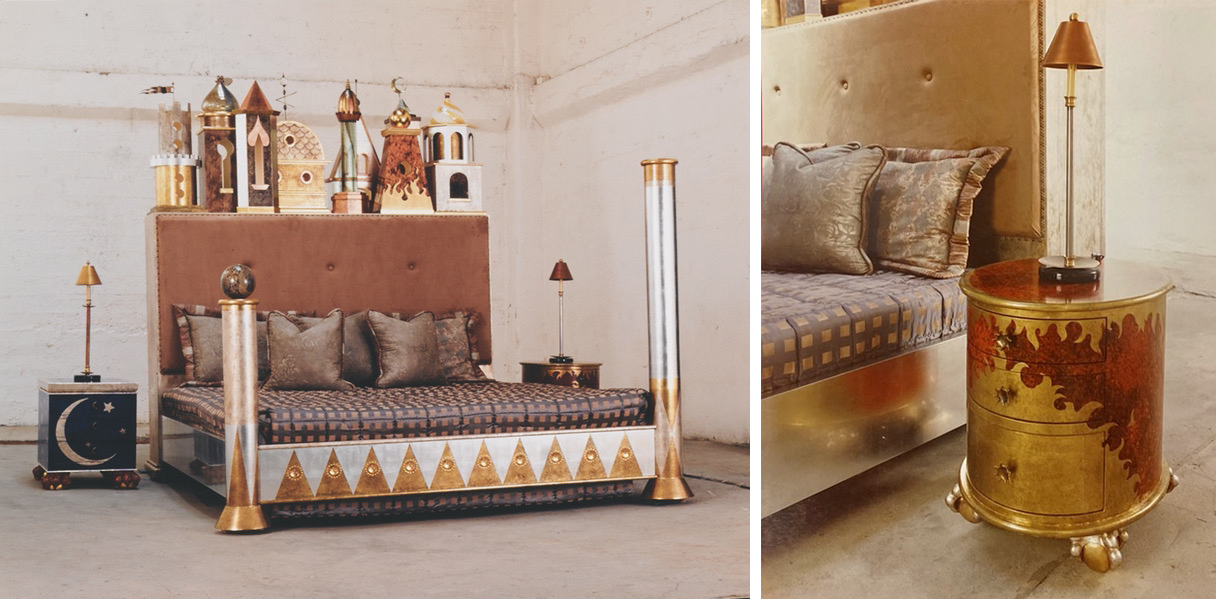
Scherezade Bed with Night & Day Side Tables (1993) - Los Angeles County Museum of Art (LACMA), Los Angeles, CA

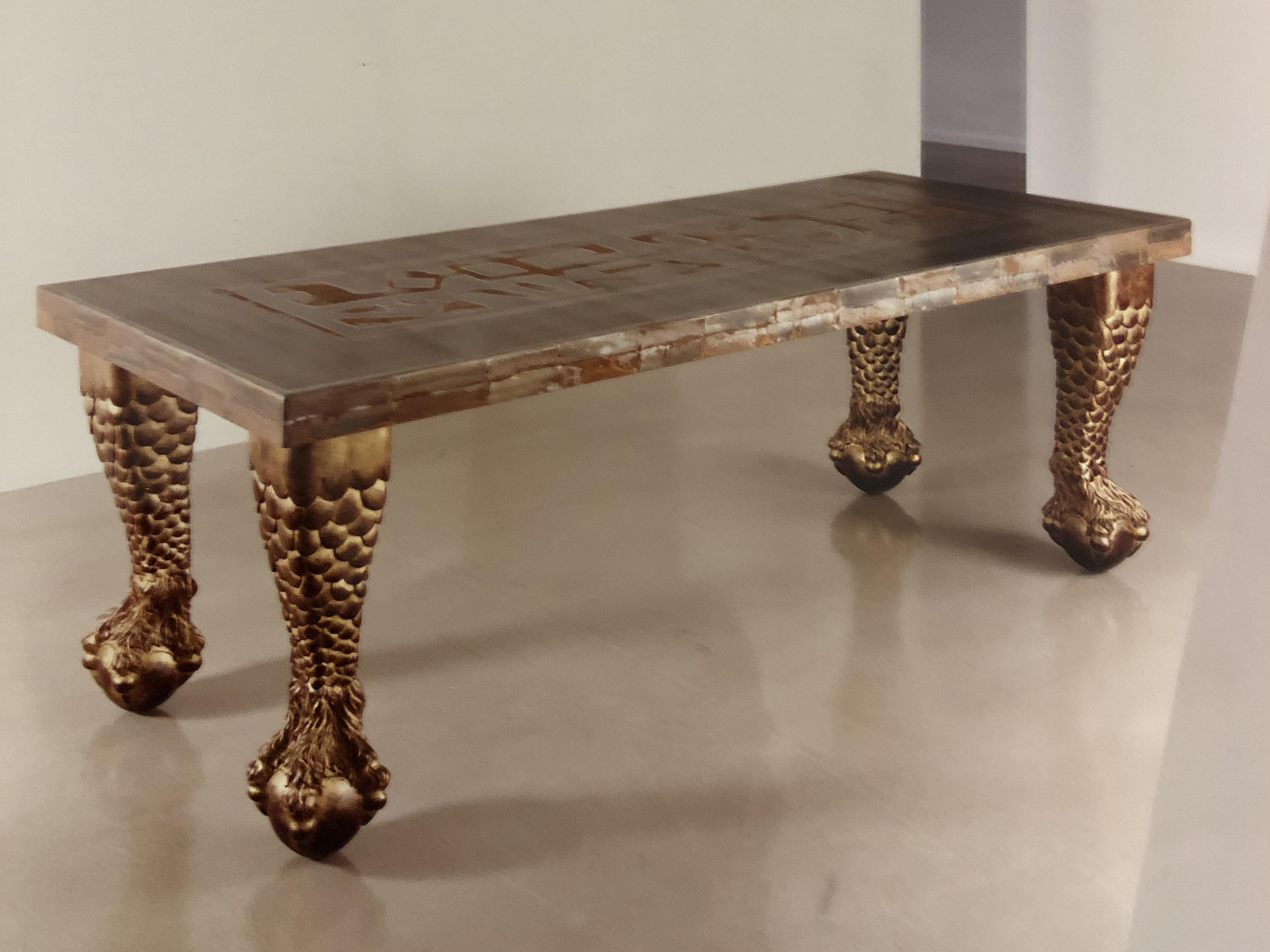
Bakuba Griffin Dining Table (1992) - Mint Museum of Craft + Design, Charlotte, NC

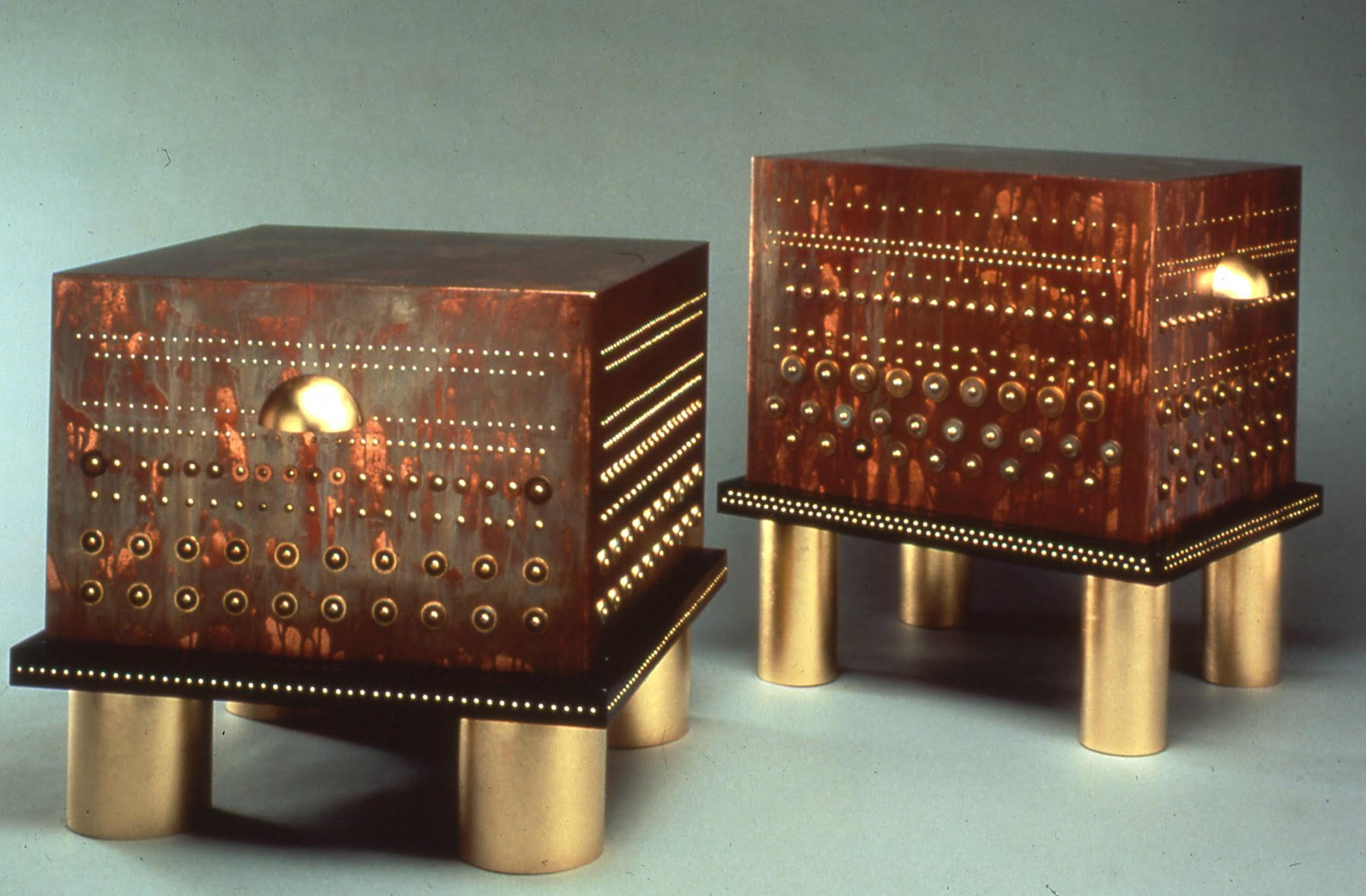
Coin Encrusted Tudor Tables III & IV (1992) - Cooper-Hewitt Museum, New York, NY

== Bibliography ==
=== Articles ===
- METALSMITH / Art Design Jewelry Metal Magazine

Society of North American Goldsmiths Volume 44, Number 1, 2024 “In Conversation with Cheryl R. Riley – Sculptures in the Form of Necklaces” by Sebastian Grant Pages 52–61
