= William Sellars =

William or Bill Sellars may refer to:

- Bill Sellars (1925–2018), British television producer
- Billy Sellars (1907–1987), English professional footballer

== See also ==
- William Sellers (disambiguation)
- William Sellar (1866–1914), Scottish footballer
