= Tom Rice (film historian) =

British film scholar (b. 1979)

- Born: Thomas William Templeman Rice; 11 October 1979 (age 46)
- Occupations: Film studies scholar, film historian, educator, author, researcher
- Known for: The studies of films made by the Ku Klux Klan, and British Empire's Colonial Film Unit; and the depiction of the far-right in media

Thomas William Templeman Rice (born 11 October 1979), is a British film studies scholar, film historian, educator, author, and researcher. He is a senior lecturer on film studies at the University of St Andrews in St Andrews, Scotland. Rice has written numerous articles and two books, one book is about Ku Klux Klan films, and the other book is about the British Empire's Colonial Film Unit.

== Work ==
Rice's book White Robes, Silver Screens: Movies and the Making of the Ku Klux Klan (2015) describes the organization's nativist pro-Protestant agenda and its attacks on Jews, Catholics, and "foreign influences" including Charlie Chaplin and his wife Pola Negri. The Klan's development in the 1920s included media campaigns in radio, print, and filmmaking. He also discusses the struggles one faces in depicting the Klan (and/or the far right) in media due its regalia. In 2015, his book White Robes, Silver Screens was awarded an honorable mention in the Forward Indies in the category of performing arts and music (nonfiction) by the Forward Reviews.

In his book Films for the Colonies: Cinema and the Preservation of the British Empire (2019), he explores the films establishment, their purposes, operations, evolution, and legacy.

== Publications ==
=== Books ===
- Rice, Tom (2015). White Robes, Silver Screens: Movies and the Making of the Ku Klux Klan. Indiana University Press. ISBN 9780253018434.
- Rice, Tom (2019). Films for the Colonies: Cinema and the Preservation of the British Empire. University of California Press. ISBN 9780520300385.

=== Articles and chapters ===
- Rice, Tom (2008). "Protecting Protestantism: The Ku Klux Klan vs. The Motion Picture Industry". Film History. 20 (3): 367–380. doi:10.2979/FIL.2008.20.3.367. S2CID 194021803.
- Rice, Tom (December 2008). ""The True Story of the Ku Klux Klan": Defining the Klan through Film". Journal of American Studies. 42 (3). Cambridge University Press: 471–488. doi:10.1017/S0021875808005537. JSTOR 40464311. S2CID 146796962.
- Rice, Tom (2011). "From the Inside: The Colonial Film Unit and the Beginning of the End". In Grieveson, Lee; MacCabe, Colin (eds.). Film and the End of Empire. Palgrave Macmillan. pp. 135–153. ISBN 978-1-84457-423-0.
- Rice, Tom (November 28, 2016). "Linking Trump to the Ku Klux Klan risks boosting a rump organisation". The Guardian.
- Rice, Tom (2021). "From the Inside: the Colonial Film Unit and the beginning of the end". Black Camera. 12 (2). Indiana University Press: 107–128. doi:10.2979/blackcamera.12.2.06.
