= Filmmaking in Colonial Nigeria =

Filmmaking in Colonial Nigeria generally refers to an era in Nigerian cinema, usually spanning the 1900s through to the 1950s, when film production and exhibition or distribution were controlled by the British colonial Government. The history of cinema in Nigeria dates back to as early as the history of film itself; notably in the late 19th century, with the use of peephole viewing of motion picture devices. These were soon replaced in the early 20th century with improved motion picture exhibition devices, with the first set of films screened at the Glover Memorial Hall in Lagos from 12 to 22 August 1903.

Filmmakers started producing films for local audiences within Nigeria since the 1920s, mostly employing the mobile cinema as a means of exhibition; the earliest feature film made in Nigeria is the 1926's Palaver produced by Geoffrey Barkas. The film was also the first film ever to feature Nigerian actors in a speaking role The Colonial Government largely utilized the cinemas as a tool to propagate British ideals, as well as to promote religious propaganda.

The Nigerian Film Unit was established in 1949. By 1954, mobile cinema vans played to at least 3.5 million people in Nigeria, and films being produced by the Nigerian Film Unit were screened for free at the 44 available cinemas. The first film entirely copyrighted to the Nigerian Film unit is Fincho (1957) by Sam Zebba; which is also the first Nigerian film to be shot in colour. The film is also regarded as a transitional film into the Golden era.

== History ==
Film as a medium first arrived Nigeria in the late 19th century, peephole viewing of motion picture devices. These were soon replaced in the early 20th century with improved motion picture exhibition devices; the first set of films shown in Nigerian theatres were Western films, with the first film screened at Glover Memorial Hall in Lagos from 12 to 22 August 1903. In that year, Herbert Macaulay had invited to Nigeria, the Balboa and Company, Spain to organize an exhibition tour of silent films in Nigeria. Although Mr Balboa later closed his Exhibition in Lagos, while he continued showing films in other West African countries, the success of his exhibition led to a European merchant, Stanley Jones, to begin showing films in the same Glover Memorial Hall, starting from November 1903. This brought about the influx of more European film exhibitors to Nigeria.

The first film hit in this early period came on 3 August 1904, when the documentary on the visit of if Alake of Abeokuta to England was screenee. Abeokuta is the capital of Ogun State.

Filmmakers started producing films for local audiences within Nigeria since the 1920s, mostly employing the mobile cinema as a means of exhibition. During the First World War, Colonial Government used cinemas as means of raising fund for war relief and for the Red Cross. The Government was also interested in producing and using documentary films to "brainwash the colonies and to propagate British ideals". As of 1921, there were four other halls showing films twice a week in Lagos Mainland and one hall each in Ebute Metta and Oshodi. By this time, cinema had become popular in Lagos with crowds of young and old people usually waiting at the doors of theatre halls. Religion also aided in the expansion of cinema culture as the Christian missionaries used cinemas for religious propaganda.

The earliest feature film made in Nigeria is the 1926's Palaver produced by Geoffrey Barkas. It was also the first film to feature Nigerian actors in a speaking role; Nigerian film actors features in Palaver include Dawiya and Yilkuba. The film was shot amongst the Sura and Angas people of the present day Bauchi and Plateau States in Northern Nigeria, and narrates the rivalry between a British District Officer and a tin miner which leads to a war. Also in this era there were several films set in Nigeria, one of the most notable being the 1935's Sanders of the River by Zoltán Korda, featuring Nigerian actor Orlando Martins. Martins also featured in other notable films including The Man from Morocco (1945), Men of Two Worlds (1946) and so on, and this established Martins as one of the recognized Nigerian actors of his time.

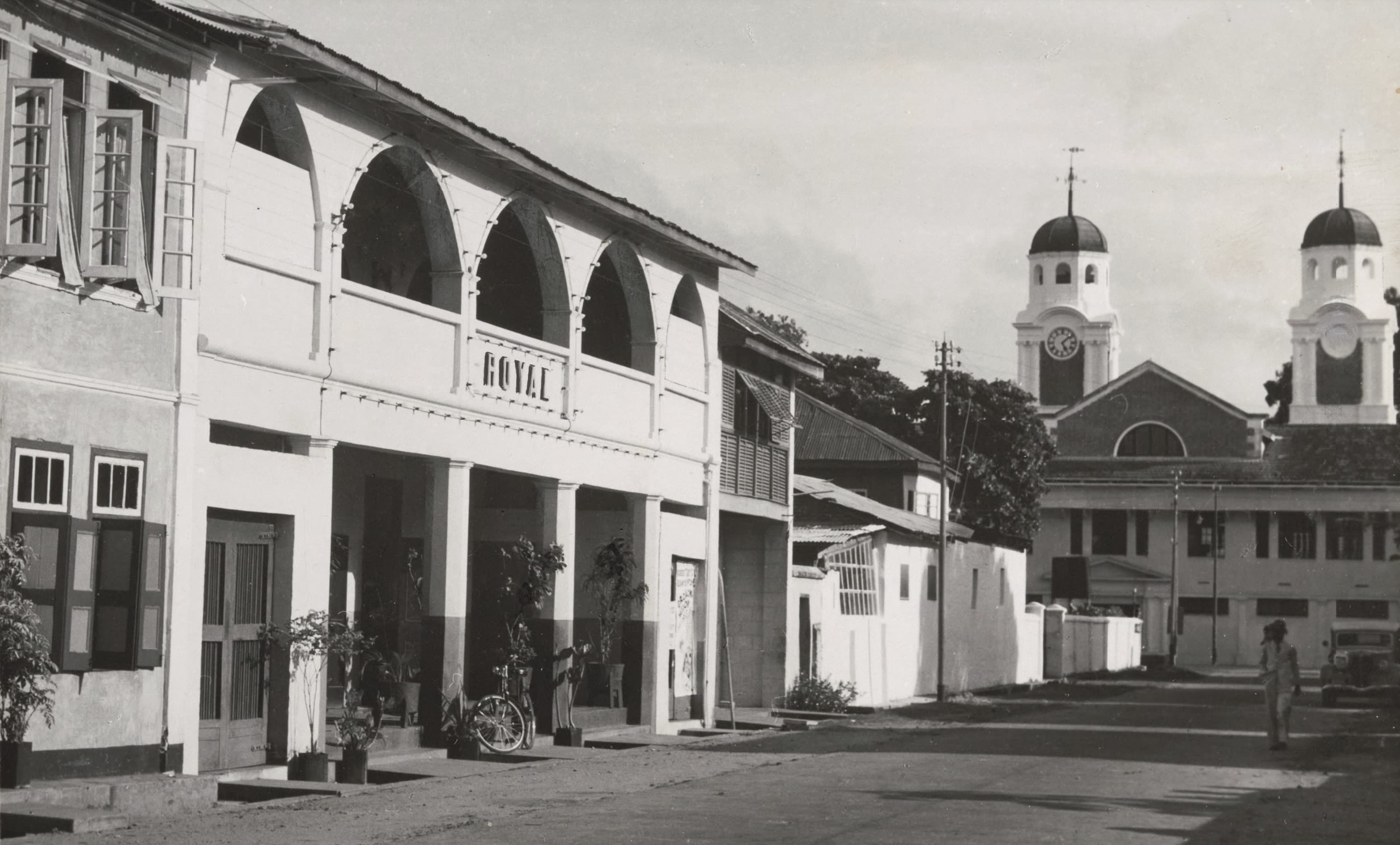
Royal Cinema on Joseph Street (now Mobolaji Bank Anthony Street) in colonial Lagos. To the right are the twin towers of the Colonial Secretariat.

As cinemas became a common feature of the social life in the then emerging city of Lagos, the late 1930s through 1940s marked the beginning of the establishment of big commercial cinema houses with branches in strategic parts of the country. One of the earliest cinema operators in Lagos was the "West African Pictures Company" owned by Mr. S. Khalil, a member of the Syrian community in Lagos. He established the Rex Cinema in Ebute Metta, Regal Cinema and Royal Cinema. Other popular cinema chains include: Capitol Cinema, Casino Cinema, Kings Cinema, Central Cinema, Rialto Cinema, Corona Cinema, Odeon Cinema, Road House Cinema, Ikeja Arms Cinema and Glover Hall. In 1937, the colonial government set up a Board of Censorship to handle matters relating to the establishment and operations of cinema houses in the colony. Nigerian content in films made and shown in Nigerian cinemas during this period were however virtually non-existent as the production and distribution were controlled by foreigners. Motion picture entertainment was as a result complemented by the Yoruba travel theatre groups, which emerged in the 1930s through 1940s; One of the most were the Agbegijo and Alarinjo theatre groups, which featured theatre actors such as Duro Ladipo, Ishola Ogunmola, Lere Paimo, and Oyin Adejobi.

In 1949, the Nigerian Film Unit was established as part of the plan to decentralize colonial film production. This unit was later reorganised into regional units in accordance with the constitutional changes in Nigeria in 1954. The Colonial Film Unit, throughout the decade, exhibited health and educational films to local audiences through its mobile cinema vans. It also produced newsreels and short documentaries, depicting celebrations and colonial achievements to domestic and overseas audiences.

In the 1950s, the state of affairs changed a bit, with more Nigerian contents being exhibited in cinemas, with a purported drive to "Africanize" film production. There became a major increase cinema audiences as a result, with an estimated annual 3.5 million audience as of 1951. As the film industry became grouped as a unit in the information department of the "Ministry of Information" in 1954, the film unit functions primarily to produce documentary films and newsreels on local events of great importance. As a result, most films screened in the 1950s were mostly educative documentaries; films that dominated Nigerian theatres especially in the late 1950s up to independence include: Government-sponsored films on health and education, documentaries on the Queen's visits to Nigeria, English football matches, Westminster Parliamentary debates and cowboy films. The government also used the cinema for advertisement purpose, and the various military campaigns were brought to the people via cinema exhibitions.

== Filmography ==
- Palaver (1926 film)
- Sanders of the River (1935)
- The Man from Morocco (1945)
- Men of Two Worlds (1946)

== See also ==
- Cinema of Nigeria
- Golden Age of Nigerian Cinema
- Media in Nigeria
