= Palaver (1926 film) =

1926 film

- Palaver: A Romance of Northern Nigeria
- Directed by: Geoffrey Barkas
- Written by: Geoffrey Barkas
- Starring: Haddon Mason; Reginald Fox; Hilda Cowley; Yiberr
- Cinematography: Stanley Rodwell
- Production company: British Instructional Films
- Release date: 1926
- Running time: 108 minutes
- Country: Nigeria
- Language: English

Palaver, otherwise known as Palaver: A Romance of Northern Nigeria, is a 1926 silent film shot in British Nigeria; it is recognized today as the first Nigerian feature film.

The film was significant for its use of non-professional local Nigerians as actors. While not a box-office success, it was to prove significant in the larger history of Nigerian cinema.

== Plot ==
The witch doctor of the Sura tribe, Yilkuba, gives a prophecy to the tribe's king, Dawiya. He tells him to beware of war and "white magic." Dawiya laughs it off, but Yilkuba urges him to be cautious, particularly of “cold water that burns." Meanwhile, Mark Fernandez, a tin miner, receives a letter from his company chastising him for his poor work output and threatens to replace him if he doesn’t improve.

Jean Stuart, a nursing sister, becomes stranded after her car breaks down on the way to the bush-hospital that she works at. Two tribe members attempt to fix the car but are unsuccessful. They enlist the help of more members and resort to pushing it instead, but they eventually get fed up and demand compensation for their work. Stuart gives them what she has, but it’s not nearly enough, and the tribe members swarm the car. Captain Peter Allison, a district officer residing in one of the nearby rest houses, hears the commotion and comes out to save Stuart. He lets her stay at the rest house with him and sends a messenger to the hospital instead.

Fernandez sets out next morning to deliver a tin shipment. He stops by Allison’s rest house, expecting to see the captain but instead comes across Stuart doing her morning exercises. He whistles at and teases her before continuing on his way.

Later, Dawiya and Yilkuba go to Fernandez’s house in response to a summons. Fernandez says that he needs more men for the mines. Dawiya argues with him and says he can’t give him more, but Fernandez offers three bottles of “medicine” (which is really just alcohol) in exchange for two hundred more men. Dawiya agrees to the trade.

A major social event takes place at Vodni a few days later. Fernandez regales his drinking partner with the tale of meeting Stuart. Allison and Stuart arrive at the event together, but when Allison leaves for a bit, Fernandez goes up to Stuart and attempts to flirt with her. Allison returns a few moments later to cut him off and leads Stuart away.

Allison later holds court to hear complaints from the Mongu tribe. The Mongu king claims that Dawiya has been stealing his cattle and attacking his people. Allison promises that Dawiya will be dealt with and his transgressions rectified.

Allison visits Dawiya’s compound to deliver the order but finds him passed out on the ground next to a stray bottle of liquor. One of the tribe members tells him that a white man from over the mountain gave the liquor to him. Allison goes to Fernandez’s house and finds an identical bottle on one of the shelves. He confronts Fernandez, but Fernandez brushes him off and denies any wrongdoing.

One day at the mines, Fernandez shows up drunk and comes across a worker who refuses to continue until he’s given better payment. Fernandez lashes out and pushes him down a hill in response. He finally suffers “the penalty of excess” from drinking so much and passes out.

Allison and Stuart explore the village of the Sura tribe, but their adventure is cut short when Stuart receives a letter summoning her to the hospital to take care of Fernandez. Allison receives a letter that reveals Fernandez was deported in 1920 and that Mark Fernandez is not his real name. He instructed to find him and hand him over to the proper authorities.

Fernandez gradually recovers from his illness under Stuart’s care. Stuart has a newfound sympathy for him but tells him to get a handle on his life. She returns to Vodni and asks Allison to help him. Allison says that it’s impossible but refuses to elaborate further. Stuart is upset by this and storms off.

Fernandez receives a letter from Allison that tells him he will be taken into custody and questioned about his deportation order. He goes to Allison’s residence and confronts him about the letter, accusing him of using his position to get Fernandez out of the way of pursuing Stuart. A fight ensues, but Fernandez eventually gives up and leaves. Stuart is greatly upset by this and demands Allison leave as well.

Backed into a corner, Fernandez goes to Dawiya’s village and, using more alcohol, tells him that Allison will arrest him and give his lands to the Mongu tribe. Allison passes through Dawiya’s lands on his way to arrest Fernandez, which leads Dawiya to believe that what Fernandez told him is true. Yilkuba warns the king that the prophecy is coming true, but Dawiya is too angry and drunk to listen and prepares for war. Distressed, Yilkuba goes to Allison and warns him of Dawiya’s incoming attack, but Allison refuses to back down. Yilkuba enlists the help of the Mongu tribe instead.

Fueled by liquor, Dawiya leads his men into battle the next day. At the same time, the king of the Mongu tribe leads his people to meet him head on. Dawiya’s men arrive at Allison’s encampment first, but Allison shoots and kills several of them with a pistol, causing the force to temporarily retreat. They try to surround the camp instead but are met with more gun fire from Allison and the tribe messengers hiding among the rocks. A spear lands in Allison’s arm and wounds him, but he manages to hold his ground until the arrival of the Mongu, who chase off Dawiya’s men.

Allison goes to Dawiya’s recently abandoned village and burns it down as punishment for the attack. Meanwhile, Dawiya finally realizes that Fernandez lied to him. He tracks him down to his house and kills him, but Allison catches him as he’s leaving. The film ends with Stuart apologizing to Allison for not believing Fernandez’s treachery. The two of them reconcile and share a kiss.

== Cast ==
- Haddon Mason as Captain Peter Allison
- Reginald Fox as Mark Fernandez, a tin miner
- Hilda Cowley as nursing sister, Jean Stuart
- Yiberr as Dawiya, King of the Sura

== Reception ==
Upon the film's release, there was some positive press. A reviewer from the Exeter and Plymouth Gazette praised the drama in the film and the work of the British officers in the movie to “tame” the native people from their practices of slavery, human sacrifice, and devil worship. They also praise the realism of the film and how the African actors played roles that they also held in real life. A reviewer from the Dundee Courier praised Palaver for its British nature and claimed that it "ranks with the greatest films ever made."

A reviewer from the Times did not find the film very interesting, claiming that it did not make full artistic use of its surroundings and thought that the romantic story line between Captain Allison and Jean Stuart was “trivial”. However, they conceded that the film might be of some educational merit. They were primarily interested in the African tribes portrayed and lamented their overall lack of use in the story, as they would have liked to see how things such as romantic relationships were handled among the Sura and Angas tribes.

== Criticism ==
Later commentators have classified Palaver amongst other colonial films which claimed the "beneficent influence of the white man in Africa."Geoffrey Barkas (director, producer, and scriptwriter) himself, in interviews about his work, referred to his casting from "cannibal pagan tribes" and spoke of their "blind savagery."

Nigerian Pulse magazine in 2017 described the film as "proudly racist", and noted: "Even though it was produced in Nigeria, Palaver was made for the British audience. There is no error in that the narrative was consistent with the popular idea sold in Europe that the colonial masters were doing Africans a favour by colonizing them."

== See also ==
- Filmmaking in Colonial Nigeria
