= Cortomobile =

Animation film festival

Cortomobile is a four-wheeled cinema, designed inside a green Alfa Romeo 2000, year 1974. It can guest two viewers only, which can choose their own show, from a "short-menù", a list of short films and animations located beside the car.

Since its first screening in 2006, the turned-into-cinema vintage car has been performing in Florence, Venice, Rome, Turin and all over Tuscany. In 2009, Cortomobile has been protagonist of the First Car Film Festival in the province of Florence.

== The "Short-menu" ==
During Cortomobile's performance, the viewers are invited to choose their own screenings from a Short-menu, a complete list of selected short films, animations and videos available, around forty. Among the directors included in the Short-menu: Adriano Valerio, Antonio Meucci, Simone Lecca.

== Festival and stops ==
2009

- Spring/Summer: Cortomobile On Tour - Sankt Pölten Höfefest (Austria); Fossano; Potenza.
- March: First Car Film Festival (Certaldo)

2008

- October: 4th Day of Contemporary
- Spring/Summer: Tuscany Tour - Florence; Centro per l'arte contemporanea Luigi Pecci Videominuto (Prato); Viareggio.

2007

- November: Torino Film Festival
- July: Pelago On the Road
- Spring/Summer: Tuscany Tour
- May: Facoltà di Architettura di Firenze

2006

- November: Creativity Festival Florence
- September: 63a Venice Film Festival
- July: Bacchereto (Prato), First stop

== See also ==
- Short films
- Alfa Romeo 2000
