= Mobile cinema =

A mobile cinema is a cinema on wheels.

An example is the Screen machine Mobile Cinema of Scotland, which provides conventional up-to-date 35mm screenings of recent movies, with full digital surround sound, air conditioning, comfortable raked seating, and full disabled access. The French have their own Cinemobile system. There are also smaller mobile cinemas employing digital projection technology. Examples of these include the Sol Cinema in the UK and Gorilla Cinema, which was established in 2000, and uses solar power and batteries to enable projection in even more remote locations. It often takes place outdoors at night or housed in marquees and other temporary structures. More recently, the mobile cinema world has seen the relaunch of a recently restored 1967 custom built mobile cinema unit (see 'History' below).

Since 2006, Italy's Cortomobile, a mobile cinema seating two viewers, has projected short films and animations in cinema festivals and has been the protagonist of the First Car Film Festival (Florence) in March 2009.

Since 1995, Cinetransformer International of Miami, Florida has circulated a fleet of mobile cinema units for use in event and experiential marketing. With a patented stadium style configuration of 91 seats, the Cinetransformer debuted as the world's first 3D mobile cinema at Comic Con in 2010 with the release of Jackass 3 in 3D. It was chosen again in 2011 to debut Final Destination 5 In 3D.

== History ==
During the Russian Civil War between Communists and counter-revolutionaries, the early cinema pioneer, Dziga Vertov, helped establish and run a film-car on Mikhail Kalinin's agit-train. He had equipment to shoot, develop, edit, and project film. The trains went to battlefronts on agitation-propaganda missions intended primarily to bolster the morale of the troops. They were also intended to stir up revolutionary fervor of the masses.

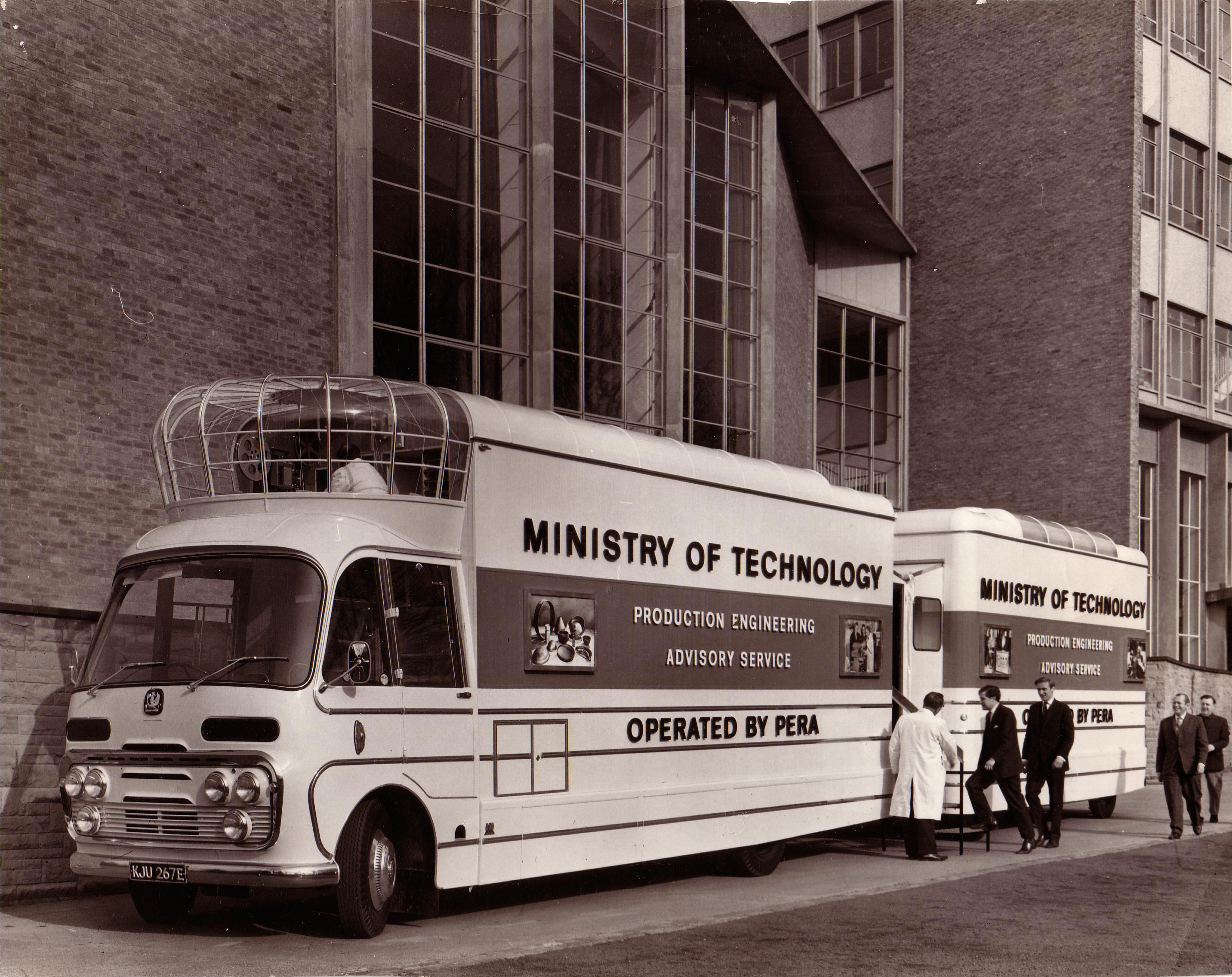
Ministry of Technology 1967

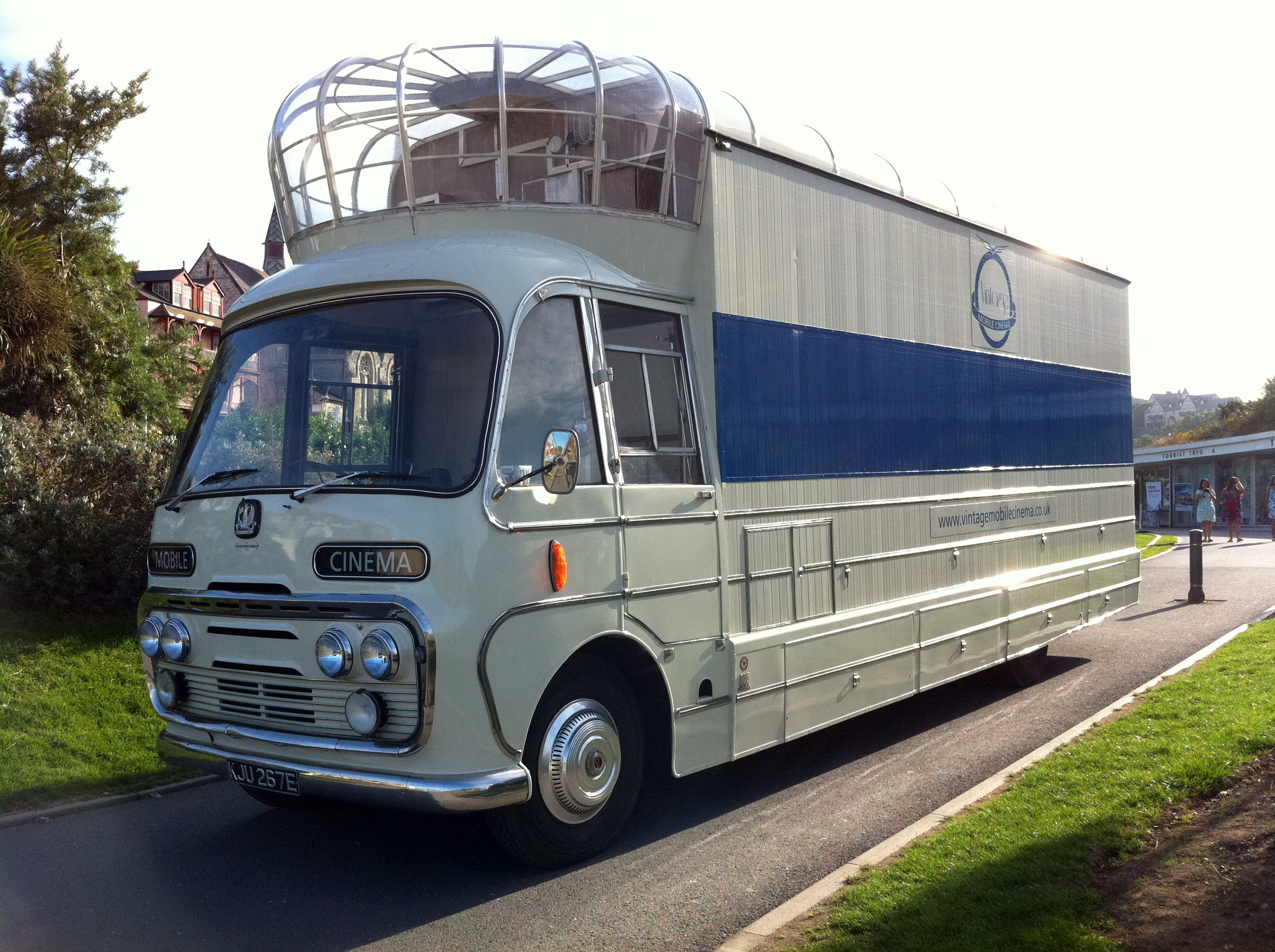
Vintage Mobile Cinema 2010

In the late 1960s, Tony Benn, working under Harold Wilson's Labour government, commissioned seven custom built mobile cinema units for the Ministry of Technology campaign to 'raise standards' and promote British industry. The project was short-lived and the units were sold off at government auction in 1974, most are thought to have been long since decommissioned and disappeared. However, one has survived via purchase by Sir William McAlpine to tour with the Flying Scotsman locomotive he rescued from America, and consequently donated to the Transport Trust in 1975 where it was in preservation for 15 years. It has since been through several private owners and following a full restoration is now in operation as Vintage Mobile Cinema, based in the South West of England. In May 2015, the only remaining Vintage Mobile Cinema was sold and will be moving to its new home on the Hertfordshire/Buckinghamshire border.

Mobile cinema was very popular during the colonial periods in Africa when Land Rovers were used as movie vans to transport a white linen screen, usually mounted on the Land Rover, a portable generator, a 16mm projector and mounted loudspeakers. In this way rural areas received propaganda and educational films, usually shown in the evenings during dark hours.

== Worldwide examples ==
=== Sol Cinema ===
The Sol Cinema is based in the UK and seats 8 people, leading it to be billed as the World's smallest solar powered cinema in 2010. It uses an LED projector showing short films in cinematic surroundings complete with usherettes; batteries to store the energy from the Sun to power the cinema. Their photovoltaic panels harness the sunlight, even as the films are being shown so they never run out of power. The Sol Cinema won a Digital Hero award for best use of sustainable technology in 2014. Total Film magazine listed the Sol Cinema at number 26th in the 'Best Movie Cinemas in the World'.

Sol Cinema is booked to perform at Glastonbury Festival each year. It also tours throughout the UK and Ireland.

=== Australia ===
Since 1999, Road Movie has been involved with unique cinematic events using mobile cinemas throughout South Australia, both in the city and country locations.
