= Carey Robinson (broadcaster) =

Jamaican broadcaster, film-maker, writer and television producer (1924–2022)

Carey Robinson CD
- Robinson, c. 1964
- Born: Carey Fitz William Robinson c. 1924
- Died: 27 January 2022 (aged 97); St Andrew, Jamaica
- Education: Howard University
- Occupations: Journalist; broadcaster; historian; film-maker
- Children: 1

Carey Fitz William Robinson CD (c. 1924 – 27 January 2022) was a Jamaican journalist, broadcaster and historian. He was head of the Jamaican government's Public Relations Office (now the Jamaica Information Service) and later general manager of Jamaica Broadcasting Corporation. He is most popularly known as the producer and narrator of the travel documentary Hill an' Gully Ride (1988–present), Jamaica's second longest-running television series. He is the author of five books: four texts on Jamaican history and a memoir.

== Biography ==
Robinson was born to Doctor Charles Carey Robinson and his wife, Marion (née Fitzritson). He was educated at Calabar High School before attending Howard University in the United States, where he studied history and psychology.

After graduating and returning to Jamaica, he took a job at The Gleaner, before he became a broadcaster at Radio Jamaica Radio (RJR). Later, he was an employee of the Government's Public Relations Office (now the Jamaica Information Service), heading the Office from the early 1960s to 1971. During this time, Robinson made a cameo appearance in Terence Young's Dr. No (1962), as well as wrote, directed and produced Time of Fury – The 1865 Morant Bay Rebellion (1965), the first film production to be made exclusively in Jamaica by Jamaicans.

In 1971, he was made general manager of Jamaica Broadcasting Corporation, exercising that office until 1987. In the 1980s, Robinson was also the executive director of the Jamaica National Heritage Trust. Later, Robinson served overseas in Jamaican embassies in Washington D.C. and Mexico City.

Robinson died on 27 January 2022, aged 97, in the parish of Saint Andrew. He was survived by his daughter.

== Honours ==
- In 1998, Robinson was honoured for a lifetime contribution to the arts with the Doctor Bird Award.
- In 2008, Robinson was appointed to the Order of Distinction, with the rank of Commander, and awarded the Musgrave Medal in gold.

== Bibliography ==
Year	Title	Publisher	ISBN	Pages	Note
1969	The Fighting Maroons of Jamaica	William Collins & Sangster	9780002112734	160	
1987	The Fight for Freedom: The Destruction of Slavery in Jamaica	LMH Publishing	9789766101602	196	
2006	Iron Thorn: The Defeat of the British by the Jamaican Maroons	LMH Publishing	9789768202413	275	
2006	The Rise And Fall Of Falmouth Jamaica, 1665–1945	LMH Publishing	9789768184689	156	
2012	Memoirs of a Jamaican Media-Man	LMH Publishing	9789768202888	258	Memoir; illustrated
