= Jamaica Film Unit =

Film production organisation

Jamaica Film Unit (1951–1961) was a division of the (British) Colonial Film Unit to produce educational and propaganda films in Jamaica. It was headed by Martin Rennalls. The unit had a mobile cinema for showing in rural areas. The unit produced 41 films in Jamaica that preserve archival footage of historical events, interviews, music, dance, and other cultural activities. Non-professional actors had roles in the films.

== Filmography ==
- Farmer Brown Learns Good Dairying (1951)
- Churchill Visits Jamaica (1953)
- It Can Happen to You (1956), about venereal disease
- Land We Love (1960)

== See also ==
- Jamaica Information Service
