= Colonial Film Unit =

British film production organisation

Journey by a London Bus (1950)

The Colonial Film Unit (C.F.U) was a propaganda and educational film production organization of the British government. It produced films for various British colonies including British Guiana and Nigeria. The Jamaica Film Unit was a division for films produced in Jamaica. The Colonial Film Unit was established in 1939 and produced 200 films before being shut down in 1955. It was part of Britain's Ministry of Information. It produced a magazine titled Colonial Cinema. Training filmmakers was also an important part of the unit's activities.

Originally established to produce British war propaganda, the C.F.U. transitioned to making instructional films after World War II.

Tom Rice is a British film historian and educator who has focused his work on studying the Colonial Film Unit, and the American Ku Klux Klan films; as well as the depiction of the far-right in media.

== Filmography ==
- Learie Constantine, welfare worker and cricketer, a documentary about Learie Constantine's welfare department work
- Springime in an English Village (1944)
- Nigerian Footballers in England (1949)
- Jungle Musicians
- An African Conference in London (1948)
- Colonial Month in London (1949)
- African Visitors to the Tower of London (1949)
- Journey by a London Bus (1950)
- Towards True Democracy (1951)

== See also ==
- GPO Film Unit
- Crown Film Unit
