= Culture of Jamaica =

Jamaican culture consists of the religion, norms, values, and lifestyle that define the people of Jamaica. The culture is mixed, with an ethnically diverse society, stemming from a history of inhabitants beginning with the original inhabitants of Jamaica (the Taínos). The Spaniards originally brought slavery to Jamaica before being overthrown by the English. Jamaica later gained emancipation on 1 August 1838, and independence from the British on 6 August 1962. Black slaves became the dominant cultural force as they suffered and resisted the harsh conditions of forced labour. After the abolition of slavery, Chinese and Indian migrants were transported to the island as indentured workers, bringing with them ideas from their country.

== Language ==
The official language of Jamaica is Jamaican Standard English, which is used in all official circumstances in the country. In addition to English, there is a creole derivative called Jamaican Patois (pronounced patwa, (/ˈpætwɑː/)) which is the common language among Jamaican citizens.

== Religion ==
By far, the largest religion in Jamaica is the Christian faith. The Anglican Church, Catholic Church, Methodist Church, Baptists, Seventh-Day Adventists , Jehovah's Witnesses and the Church of God are present throughout the country. Many old churches have been carefully maintained and/or restored. The Rastafari movement is a derivative of the larger Christian culture, but its origins were influenced by rising consciousness of Africa, and an awareness of political events in that continent. There is also a small number of Jewish synagogues in Jamaica, dating from the 17th century along with a few mosques.

Elements of ancient African religions remain, especially in remote areas throughout the island. Some of these practices are described generally as Obeah, Kumina, or Pocomania. Though the congregations are small, they are visited by many Christians and non-Christians seeking an experience they have not found in the churches. It is estimated that as much as 40% of the population secretly seek the services of the African traditional religious healers (also called Obeah workers) when confronted with serious problems that conventional medicine cannot remedy.

The Baháʼí Faith arrived in Jamaica in 1943, brought by an American Baháʼí pioneer, Dr. Malcolm King. In 2003, as part of the 60th anniversary celebration of the establishment of Baháʼí in Jamaica, the Governor General of Jamaica, Sir Howard Cooke, proclaimed a National Baháʼí Day to be held annually on 25 July. In 2005, the community of about 5000 celebrated their activity and presence in Jamaica with the international Baháʼí choir, The Voices of Bahá. The choir performed at Ward Theater and the University of the West Indies' Chapel, with proceeds earmarked to two Jamaican charities, (one serving families of policemen slain in the line of duty, and the one Denham Town Golden Age Home).

Other religions practiced in Jamaica include Buddhism, Hinduism, and Islam.

=== Rastafari ===
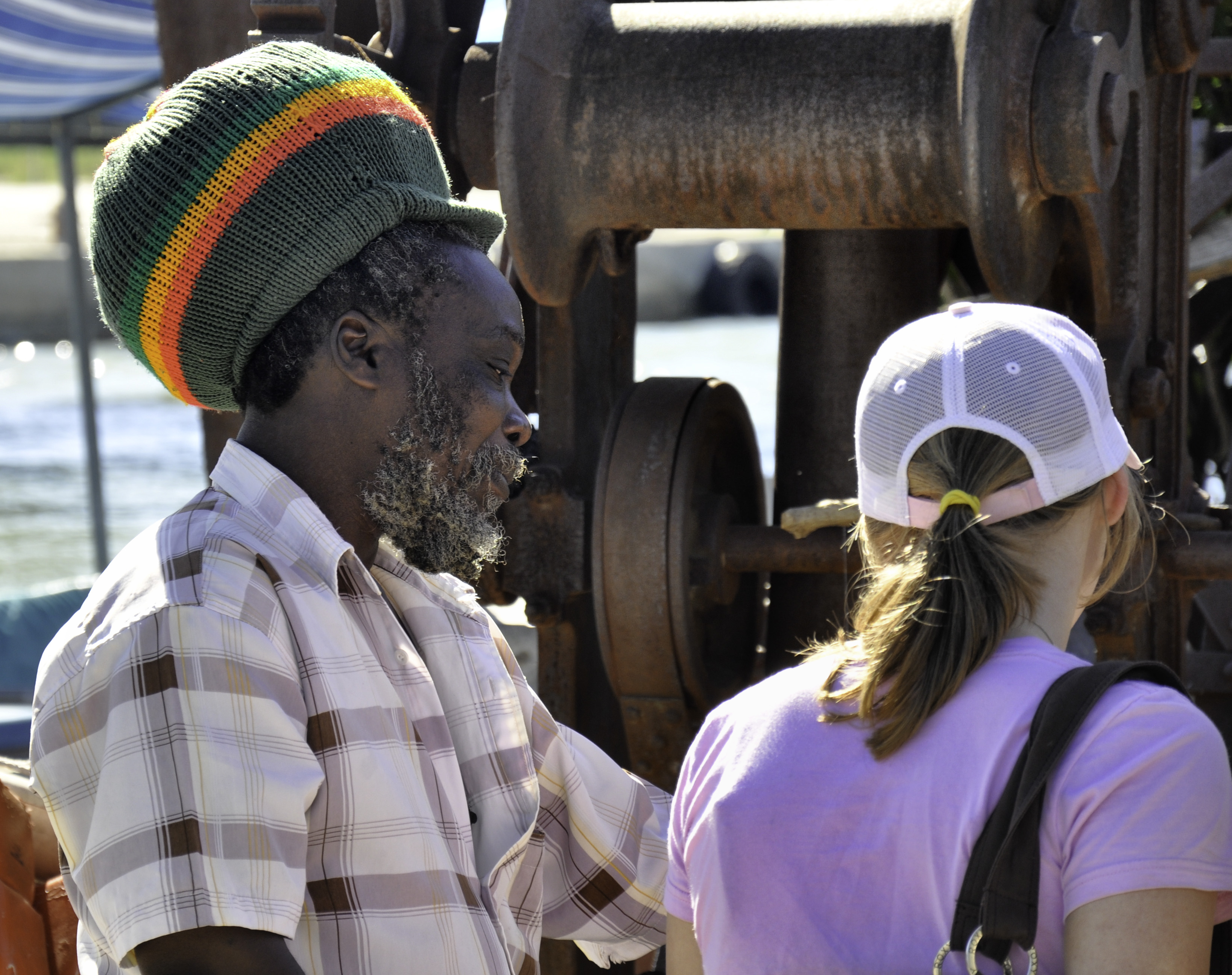
A Rastafarian man in a rastacap at a port of Jamaica's Black River.

Originating in the 1930s, one of the most prominent, internationally known aspects of Jamaica's African-Caribbean culture is the Rastafari movement, particularly those elements that are expressed through reggae music. In the 1970s and early 1980s, Bob Marley became the most high-profile exponent of the Rastafari culture and belief system. His reputation as an innovative musician devoted to his faith has continued to grow since his death, so that by 2004 his greatest hits compilation, Legend, had sold 20 million copies worldwide, making him arguably the world's most famous Jamaican in the music industry, and certainly the nation's biggest-selling recording artist.

Rastafari itself is a monotheistic belief system, based on teachings found in the Old Testament and the New Testament – particularly the Book of Revelation. However, what distinguishes Rastafari from Christianity, Islam, and Judaism, (which also cite Abrahamic beliefs), is that Rastas believe in the divinity of the Emperor Haile Selassie of Ethiopia.

Hailed by Rastas as H.I.M. (His Imperial Majesty), Haile Selassie I is regarded as God himself, the true descendant of Solomon, and the earthly embodiment of Jah (God) – in what believers see as a fulfillment of prophecy regarding the second coming of the Messiah.

Those Rasta beliefs, which are not explicitly mentioned in the Bible (such as the specific name of H.I.M. "Haile Selassie"), are not gathered into a single holy text. Instead, Rasta beliefs are primarily shared through a community of songs, chants, and oral testimonies, as well as in written texts (including websites). The extensive use of song makes Rastafari a particularly musical source of Jamaican culture.

Rasta cultural traditions include wearing their hair in uncut, uncombed strands known as dreadlocks (in adherence to the Nazarite vow), as well as eating unprocessed (natural) foods which are called Ital. However, neither tradition is regarded as compulsory – many people who wear dreadlocks are not Rastas, and many Rastas do not wear them.

One of the most controversial cultural traditions is Rastas' use of ganja as a sacrament which is smoked to aid in reasoning (contemplation and discussion) during their religious rituals.

In its Jamaican homeland, Rastafari is a minority culture and receives little in the way of official recognition. Jamaica is an overwhelmingly Christian country, so Rasta beliefs and practices – such as the divinity of H.I.M Hailie Selassie – are sometimes regarded as pagan by Christian Jamaicans. (Some Rastas also express hostility towards aspects of Christianity.) Nevertheless, the artistic contributions of the movement, particularly by Bob Marley, are widely respected. Marley was awarded the Jamaican Order of Merit in 1981, and there are two official monuments to him.

Rastas can be found in many countries outside Jamaica and among many non-Jamaicans. Because it is not a centrally organised religion, there is no way of knowing how many devotees there are.

== Dance ==
Dance has always been important to Jamaica – from colonial times until the present. Early folk rhythms and movements often enhanced Christian religious celebrations or were associated with Christian holidays. More recently, dances have become associated with the music of Jamaica, particularly dancehall styles.

Dance theatre is also growing in importance. Rex Nettleford, Eddy Thomas, Tony Wilson, Olive Lewin, and Edna Manley are five Jamaicans whose influences on the arts – music and dance in particular – have been extremely important. Nettleford, Thomas, and Ivy Baxter formed the National Dance Theatre Company in 1962. Other important Jamaicans in dance theatre have included the Tony Award-winning choreographer Garth Fagan (The Lion King on Broadway).

Dancehall, or reggae, music has inspired a number of dance styles as well. To understand the evolution of popular dance, it helps to understand the musical progression. Ska music, with fast beats, also had fast dances. The slow to rocksteady also developed slower dances, allowing dancers to stay on the floor longer. Reggae is associated with many things, including the Rastafarian movement, but influenced the newer styles.

Dancehall music often creates its own dances based on moves in the lyrics of the songs themselves. Soca music from Trinidad and Tobago is popular with most of the popular artists from Trinidad, but many soca Jamaican artists such as Byron Lee, Fab 5, and Lovindeer are famous but also represent Jamaican music.

Daggering is a form of dance originating from Jamaica. The dance incorporates dry sex, wrestling and other forms of frantic movement.

Bruckins is a Jamaican dance performed to celebrate Emancipation Day.

List of Dances:

- Bruckins
- Della Move
- Blasé
- Fling
- Needle Eye
- Bogle dance
- Whine
- Daggering
- Grinding
- Bump
- Twerking
- Skanking
- Dancehall
- Burru
- Dinki-minni
- Ettu
- Gerreh
- Gumbay
- Jonkunnu
- Kumina
- Maypole
- Myal
- Quadrille
- Tambu
- Zella
- Nuh Linga
- Syvah
- Lowe Mi
- Log On
- Butterfly dance
- Stookie
- Skip To My Lou
- Gully Creepa
- Willie Bounce
- Tek Weh Yourself
- Whine & Dip
- Mambo
- One Drop
- Bad Man Forward Bad Man Pull Up
- Bubbling
- Whine & Kotch
- Like Glue
- To Di World
- Screetchie
- One Vice
- Revival
- Breakdancing
- Shovel It
- Sweep
- Wacky Dip
- Tic Toc
- Jiggy
- Out & Bad
- Row Di Boat
- Team Up
- Upload
- Voom
- H-Factor
- Bruk Back
- Rolly Polly
- Hot Yuk
- Flairy
- Palance
- Nuh Grain No Corn
- Passa Passa
- Dutty Bung Bang
- Scooby Doo
- Mad Ova
- Chiney Bounce
- Go Go Wine
- Bumpa
- Rock Away
- Rocksteady
- Big Up
- Signal di Plane
- Rum and Red Bull
- Dandymite
- Logwood Walk
- Dutty Steppin
- Rockaz
- Headtop
- Pon de River, Pon de Bank
- Poco Dance
- Azonto
- Chakacha
- Sento
- Shaku Shaku
- Ska
- Heel and Toe
- Genna Bounce
- Ras Daps
- Level Up
- Wul Up
- Hula Hoop

== Theatre ==
Jamaica's earliest theatre was built in 1682. Several more theatres opened in the 1700s and 1800s, attracting performances by both professional touring companies and amateur groups. But performances weren't limited to official venues. Many took place in houses, stores, courthouses, and enclosed outdoor spaces large enough to hold them. During this period, classic plays such as Shakespeare were most often produced. However, the Jewish and French communities became large enough to merit productions aimed at them, too.

After the abolishment of slavery, Jamaicans began fusing music, humour, and dance into public theatrical performances. Although it took many years for true Jamaican styles to develop, eventually they became more prevalent than European works. Today's most popular theatrical form in Jamaica, pantomime, began in the 1940s as a fusion of English pantomime with Jamaican folklore. Another popular style, "Roots" (Grassroots) Theatre, evolved in the 1960s and 1970s. These riotous bawdy tales remained crowd favourites in Kingston's open-air theatres.

One artist involved in root plays is Winsome (code name), a Jamaican writer and producer chronicled in Deborah Thomas' book "Modern Blackness". Winsome handled all the publicity for her plays herself, and ended up putting them on in the rural areas surrounding Kingston – the city theaters refused to house her plays because of their controversial nature. In her plays, Winsome explores how sex, money, and power interact every day for Jamaicans. In 1997, Winsome wrote and produced a root play entitled Ruff Rider, in which family, sexual abuse, love, work, and friendship all intersect. According to author Thomas, author of, "In all of her work, the sympathetic characters are those she portrays as struggling to balance their own pursuit of individual gain with 'living well together' with others. As they negotiate the fine lines between egalitarianism and hierarchy, her characters also contribute to the public debate regarding the gendered dimensions of respectability and reputation."

Other notable roots play figures include Ralph Holness, Ginger Knight, Balfour Anderson, Michael Denton, Ian Reid, Paul Beil, Everton Dawkins, Luke Ellington (Lukington), Buddy Pouyat and the late Hyacinth Brown.

== Literature and writing ==
Derek Walcott, a Nobel Prize laureate, born and educated in St. Lucia, attended college in Jamaica. Other significant writers from the island include Claude McKay and Louis Simpson. Plays and works in Jamaican English, or patois, attract special attention. Louise Bennett, Andrew Salkey and Mikey Smith have contributed to this phenomenon by writing works in patois. Ian Fleming wrote his famous James Bond novels while living in Jamaica. Jean Rhys is also well known for her novel Wide Sargasso Sea, which was set in Jamaica. Jamaican writer Marlon James won the 2015 Man Booker Prize for his novel A Brief History of Seven Killings.

Jamaican authors are always faced with the decision of writing in standard English for a huge worldwide audience, or in the local patois, for a much smaller, but more trendy, audience. Jamaican films with patois sound-tracks such as The Harder They Come (1972) require sub-titles for export to general markets. In general, the use of patois severely limits the potential audience for the otherwise universal Jamaican message.

Recent poets laureate of Jamaica include Mervyn Morris (appointed in 2014) and his successor Lorna Goodison, appointed in 2017.

== Film ==
Jamaica's film industry is not widely known, but it is growing. The Harder They Come, Rasta Rockett, Shottas, Third World Cop, Rockers, Countryman, Dancehall Queen & " Real Ghetto Youths" are a few of the best-known Jamaican movies. However, many popular Hollywood movies have also been filmed in Jamaica. A short list includes The Blue Lagoon, Cocktail, Cool Runnings and James Bond films, Dr. No, Live and Let Die and No Time to Die.

Jamaica's leading annual film event The Reggae Film Festival takes place each February in Jamaica's capital city, Kingston. Members of Jamaica's film industry gather here to make new links and many new projects have grown from the event.

Jamaica has numerous filmmakers but there is a great lack of available funds and resources for filmmakers. Since the creation of the Reggae Film Festival, there have been many new films made in Jamaica and the event has given the industry a significant boost, this combined with the recent CARICOM European film treaty which enables Jamaican filmmakers to seek funding in Europe, has opened up a new door for filmmakers looking to apply for funding.

Other more recent feature films made in Jamaica are: 'Almost Heaven', 'Roots Time', 'Wah Do Dem', 'Concrete Jungle', 'Redemption Paradise', 'Real Ghetto Youths', and 'Smile Orange'.

== Woodwork, furniture, and metalwork ==
Jamaicans have a long history of fine craftsmanship in wood and metal. Jamaica was home to many excellent furniture factories dating from colonial times, and Jamaican "Georgian" furniture was exported to the metropolitan countries. Jamaica is in the Caribbean so its exports of furniture is important.

== See also ==
- Jamaican art
- Jamaican English
- Jamaican Georgian architecture
- John Canoe, ritual
- Kariba suit
- List of museums in Jamaica
- Mauger (Jamaican Patois term)
- Music of Jamaica
- National Gallery of Jamaica
- Nine nights, funerary tradition
- Public holidays in Jamaica
- Pushcart derby, street race
- Ratchet knife
- Jamaican cuisine
