= Cartography of Jamaica =

Historic maps of Jamaica

The Cartography of Jamaica is the history of surveying and creation of maps of Jamaica. A list of maps of Jamaica in chronological order is shown below.

== 1494–1949 ==
Sortable table
K#	Date	Title	Carto- grapher	Description	Image
1	1528	Map of Jamaica	Benedetto Bordone	A very simple map of Jamaica from Bordone's Isolario (The Book of Islands), printed in Venice in 1528.	
2	1562	Isola Cuba Nova	Girolamo Ruscelli	Fragment showing Jamaica from an early map of Cuba in Ruscelli's Atlas, probably the 1562 edition, published in Italy.	
4	1572	Jamaica	Tomaso Porcacchi	Early map of Jamaica (and part of Cuba) engraved by Girolamo Porro for Porcacchi's book L'Isole piu Famose del Mondo, first published in Venice in 1572.	
8	1631	Map of the Caribbean	Gerardus Mercator(?)	Fragment showing Jamaica from map of Cuba, Puerto Rico, Jamaica, Hispaniola and S Margarita Island (off the coast of Venezuela) in the first Cloppenburgh edition of the large-format Mercator-Hondius Atlas Minor, published in Amsterdam, 1630.	
13	1671	Novissima et Accura-tissima Jamaicae Descriptio	John Ogilby	Engraved by F Lamb, includes a table showing plantations, precincts and settlements on the island.	
17	1671	A new and exact map of the isle of Jamaica	Richard Bloome	Survey carried out on the instructions of the Governor Thomas Modyford divided into precincts and parishes	
22	1676	Jamaica and Barbados	John Speed	Top half of a hand tinted map of Jamaica and Barbados printed by Thomas Basset and Richard Chiswell, London, England. On the reverse there is a description of the two islands.	
26	1680	Jamaica	Nicolaes Visscher II		
	1683	de Cuba et de Iamaica	Alain Manesson Mallet	An extract showing Jamaica from an engraving in Mallet's Description de L'Univers published by Thierry, Paris, 1683.	
	1684	A New and Exact Mapp of the Island of Jamaica	Charles Bochart and Humphrey Knollis		
24	1688	Insula Jamaica	Robert Morden		
49	1710	Neiuwe Kaart van het Eyland Jamaica	Hermann Moll		
	1711	Jamaica			
	1715	A New Map of the English Empire in the Ocean of America or West Indies	John Senex		
	1717	A New Map of the Island of Jamaica	Herman Moll		
54	1720	The island of Jamaica divided into its principal parishes...	Herman Moll		
	1728	The Island of Jamaica	Herman Moll		
	1730	Dominia Anglorum præcipuis in Insulis Americæ	Homann's Heirs		
65	1744	A New and Accurate Map of the Island of Jamaica	Emanuel Bowen		
64	1746	La Jamaique	Georges-Louis Le Rouge		
66	1753	Carte de l'Isle de Jamaique	Jacques-Nicolas Bellin		
71	1755	A new map of Jamaica ... from actual surveys made ... from the year 1730 to 1749	Patrick Browne		
	1757	A Correct Map of Jamaica	Georg Dionysius Ehret		
77	1758	Carte de l'Isle de Jamaique	Jacques-Nicolas Bellin		
76	1758	Carte Particularie De L’ Isle De La Jamaique	Jacques-Nicolas Bellin		
	1760	A Correct Map of Jamaica			
83	1762	A Correct Map of the Island of Jamaica	John Gibson		
89	1765	A New Map of the Island of Jamaica	Thomas Kitchin		
101	1775	Jamaica	Thomas Jeffreys		
104	1779	La Giammaica	Antonio Zatta		
105	1780	Carte de l'Isle de la Jamaique	Rigobert Bonne		
131	1794	A Map of the Island of Jamaica	Bryan Edwards		
141	1805	Charte von Jamaica	Jean Baptiste Marie George Bory de Saint Vincent		
	1812	Isle de la Jamaique	Arrowsmith		
145	1814	Jamaica	John Thomson		
150	1822	Geographical, Statistical, and Historical Map of Jamaica	Carrey & Lea		
151	1823	Jamaica	Fielding Lucas		
152	1825	Jamaique	J A Buchon		
	1835	The British Island in the West Indies	Society for the Diffusion of Useful Knowledge		
	1836	Jamaica	J & C Walker		
	1850	Tourist Map of the Island of Jamaica	Edward Vincent D'Invilliers		
	1851	Jamaica	J Rapkin / J Tallis		
	1854	Jamaica	Harvey Newcomb		
	1859	Map of Haiti and Jamaica	Edward Weller		
	1860	Island of Jamaica	Fullarton		
	1880	General Chart of the Island of Jamaica	John Purdy		
	1882	Outline Map of Jamaica	Dangerfield		
	1892	Cuba and Jamaica	D Appleton & Co		
	1903	Jamaica	Dodd, Mead and Company		
	1908	Jamaica Earthquake	Vaughn Cornish		
	1910	Jamaica	Cram		

== 1950–1979 ==
=== The 1:50,000 series ===
Between the early 1950s and the late 1970s the UK Directorate of Overseas Surveys published several editions of a series of maps of Jamaica at the scale of 1:50,000. The following table summarises the known publication dates. Online copies can be found on Commons or at the University of Texas Libraries.

Sheet	First Edition	Second Edition	Third Edition	Commons	University of Texas
Sheet A	1959			First edition	First edition
Sheet B	1958			First edition	First edition
Sheet C	1959 (reprinted 1973)			First edition	First edition
Sheet D	1959 (reprinted 1974)			First edition	First edition
Sheet E	1958 (reprinted 1974)			First edition	First edition
Sheet F	1958 (reprinted 1974)			First edition	First edition
Sheet G	1958		1973		First edition
Sheet H	1958		1973 (reprinted 1974)		First edition
Sheet K			1970 (reprinted 1974)		Third edition
Sheet L	1954		1966 (reprinted 1970 & 1973)		Third edition
Sheet M	1954		1967 (reprinted 1973)		Third edition
Sheet N	1954		1967 (reprinted 1971)		Third edition

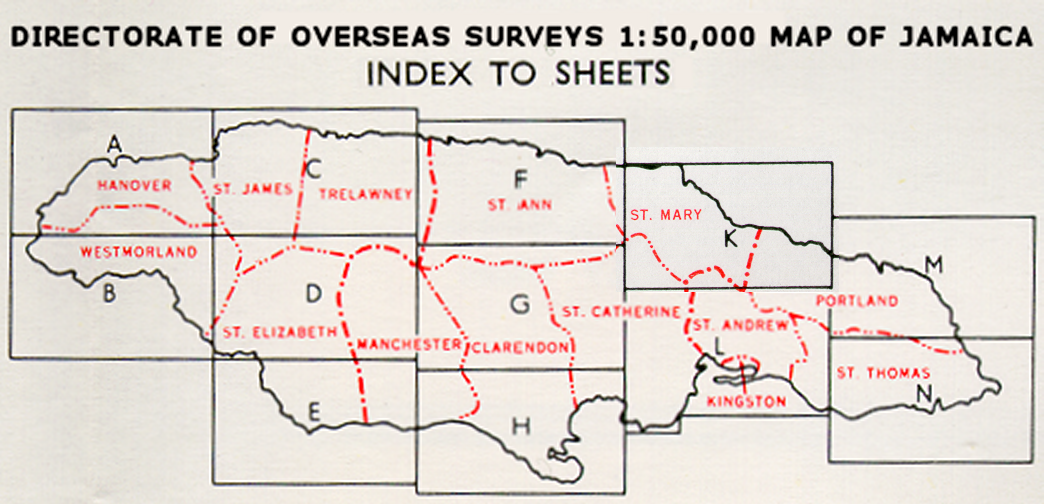
Index to the 1:50,000 maps of Jamaica published by the UK Directorate of Overseas Surveys from the early 1950s on.

=== Others ===
Sortable table
K#	Date	Title	Cartographer	Description
	1967	Jamaica Road Map	Esso	
	1972	Jamaica Road Map	Texaco	

== Town plans ==
=== Kingston ===
==== The 1:10,000 series ====
Between the early 1950s and the early 1970s the UK Directorate of Overseas Surveys published several editions of a series of maps of Kingston at the scale of 1:50,000. The following table summarises the known publication dates. Online copies can be found at the University of Texas Libraries.

Sheet	First Edition	Second Edition	Third Edition	University of Texas
Central sheet	1962			First edition
Sheet 1	1965		1972	First edition
Sheet 2	1965		1972	First edition
Sheet 3	1963		1972	First edition
Sheet 4	1964		1972	First edition
Sheet 5	1964		1972	First edition
Sheet 6	1964		1972	First edition

==== Others ====
Sortable table
Date	Title	Carto- grapher	Description
1702	A Plan of Kingston	Christian Lilly	Map which may have been the combined work of John Goffe and Christian Lilly to provide a plan for the newly founded city.
1740-45	Plan of Kingston	Michael Hay	Map dedicated to Jamaica's governor Edward Trelawny. Several possible dates are given for its publication.
1764	Plan de la Ville de Kingston	Jacques Nicolas Bellin	From the author's Le Petit Atlas Maritime, published in Paris, France in 1764.
1891-06	Kingston and environs	War Office	A lithograph published by Edward Stanford for the Intelligence Division of the War Office. It was based on earlier maps and Admiralty charts, updated with the observations of five army officers. The illustration shows an extract depicting Kingston Harbour.
1897	The City of Kingston	James H. Stark	From the author's Stark's Jamaica Guide.

=== Montego Bay ===
Petrol company road maps

- Esso, 1967, on reverse
- Texaco, 1972, on reverse

=== Spanish Town ===
Petrol company road maps

- Esso, 1967, on reverse
- Texaco, 1972, on reverse

=== Mandeville ===
Petrol company road maps

- Esso, 1967, on reverse
- Texaco, 1972, on reverse

== Bibliography ==
- Higman, B W & Hudson, B J (2009). "Place names and history". Jamaican Place Names. Mona, Jamaica: University of the West Indies Press. pp. 13–18. ISBN 978-976-640-217-4.
- Kapp, Kit S (1968). The Printed Maps of Jamaica up to 1825. Kingston, Jamaica: Bolivar Press.
