= Ivy Baxter =

Jamaican dancer and choreographer (1923–1993)

Ivy Baxter MBE CD
- Born: Ivy Everlyn Allan Baxter; March 3, 1923; Spanish Town, Colony of Jamaica, British Empire
- Died: January 9, 1993 (aged 69); Kingston, Jamaica
- Education: University of Toronto
- Known for: Pioneer of Jamaican dance

Ivy Everlyn Allan Baxter MBE CD (March 3, 1923 – January 9, 1993) was a pioneer in the field of Jamaican dance. She was the first person to combine modern dance with Jamaica's African folk dance. Her work celebrating African cultural roots contributed to the Jamaican independence movement's creation of a national identity.

== Biography ==
Ivy Baxter was born on March 3, 1923, in Spanish Town, Jamaica. She was the youngest of six daughters. When her mother died while Baxter was young, she was raised by an aunt. She attended Wolmer's Girls School in the 1940s, where she learned English country dance. Around this time, she also converted to Catholicism. During the 1930s and 40s, Baxter studied classical ballet, tap, and character dancing at a Kingston dance studio.

Baxter worked as a secretary at the YMCA, where she interacted with dance instructors Phyllis Stapells and Bretta Powels. Stapells and Powells taught creative dance, with an innovative approach adapting English country dance to local Jamaican styles. It was decided that Baxter would be trained to replace Stapells. She was awarded a Jamaica Scholarship to study physical education at the University of Toronto.

Upon returning to Jamaica, Baxter worked as a physical education teacher. From 1950 to 1951, she studied at London's Sigurd Leeder School of European Ballet, where she studied Labanotation and movement analysis. In 1950, she created The Ivy Baxter Modern Creative Dance Group (IBDG). The group included Joyce Campbell, Alma Mock-Yen, Eddy Thomas, Rex Nettleford, Clive Thompson, and Garth Fagan, who later created the National Dance Theatre Company of Jamaica.

After Baxter returned to Jamaica in 1952, the Ivy Baxter Dance Group worked to create a unique Jamaican dance vocabulary and style, pioneering Caribbean creative dance in Jamaica. Baxter started the "barefoot movement," separating her dance from the colonial, European folk dance taught in Jamaican schools. She was the first Jamaican choreographer to combine African folk dance with modern expressionist dance. Baxter was the "first person to superimpose a distinctive STYLE on the indigenous movement patterns of the country without attempting to rearrange it too much." Her work depicted folk narratives, Jamaican history, and contemporary situations.

The Ivy Baxter Dance Group danced at national and civic events and public festivals, introducing Jamaican folk dance. The group toured the United States and Latin America. Baxter also ran Summer Schools, of ten financed using her personal resources, to teach dancers from around the Caribbean. For the group's tenth anniversary, members performed Upon a Seaweed, Jamaica's first integrated full-length musical.

In 1966, Baxter became the dance adjudicator for Jamaica Welfare. In this position, Baxter was introduced to Jamaica's rural communities and their dance styles. She also interacted with festivals and Jamaican folklore. Her work helped instigate the 1962 Jamaica Independence Festival and the creation of the Jamaica School of Dance. Baxter led the "education, documentation and dissemination of Jamaican traditional forms." Baxter also introduced dance into folk rituals and customs.

In 1961, Baxter went to New York City to study physical education, recreation, and dance teaching at Columbia University Teacher's College. During this time, members of the Ivy Baxter Dance Group created the National Dance Theatre Company of Jamaica, building on Baxter's work. The Ivy Baxter Dance Company officially closed in 1967.

In 1966, Baxter began working towards a Ph.D. at Florida University. Her work led to the publication of The Arts of an Island, one of the first books documenting Jamaican dance. Upon returning to Jamaica, Baxter worked as the coordinator and acting director of Excelsior High School and the Excelsior Education Center until she retired in 1982. Baxter was a strong believer in using dance as a teaching and therapeutic tool. She worked to create dance programs for the elderly at Excelsior.

Baxter worked with many institutions, including the Council of the Institute of Jamaica, the Jamaica School of Music and the Jamaica School of Dance.

== Honours ==
Baxter was appointed to the Order of the British Empire, with the rank of Member, by Elizabeth II in the 1962 New Year Honours. She was also a Commander of the Order of Distinction.

== Personal life ==
Baxter developed diabetes, leading to her losing a toe. Baxter died in Kingston, Jamaica of diabetic neuropathy or kidney failure on January 9, 1993.
