= Marjorie Whylie =

Jamaican musical artist (born 1944)

- Born: 1944 (age 81–82); St. Andrew, Jamaica
- Education: St Andrew High School; University of the West Indies
- Occupations: Pianist, percussionist and educator
- Years active: 1950s–present
- Relatives: Dwight Whylie (brother)

Marjorie Whylie СD OD (born 1944) is a Jamaican pianist, percussionist and educator who was musical director of the National Dance Theatre Company for 45 years.

== Biography ==
Whylie was born in St. Andrew, Jamaica, in 1944. She began playing piano when she was two and a half years old and had formal lessons from the age of six. She performed in public from the age of five, attended St. Andrew High School from the age of nine, and as a student at the University of the West Indies (UWI) played steelpan.

She taught Spanish at Kingston College and began teaching music. In 1962, she was part of the "Roots and Rhythms" dance production set up to celebrate Jamaican independence and worked with Eddy Thomas and Rex Nettleford, who co-founded the National Dance Theatre Company (NDTC). Whylie joined the NDTC in 1965 as a pianist, going on to become leader of the NDTC singers, and she was musical director of the NDTC for 45 years before retiring in 2013. She also studied dance and for nine years, ballet.

Her interest in traditional Jamaican and African music was reflected in her work with the NDTC, with Nettleford describing Whylie's understanding of traditional music as critical to its artistic direction, and her enthusiasm for Jamaican rhythms has been influential in Jamaican music generally.

She worked with the National Pantomime before becoming a household name in Jamaica via her performances on children's television programme Ring Ding between the early 1970s and 1982. She went on to become acting director of the music department at the UWI and head of the Folk Music Research Department at the Jamaica School of Music. She has lectured outside her homeland in Europe and North America.

She performed for many years as part of the Jamaica Big Band, playing piano and congas, is leader of the band Whylie Rhythm, which has performed internationally, and has performed with Cedric Brooks.

Whylie was awarded the Order of Distinction - Officer Class by the Jamaican government, and in 2015 she was named as a recipient of the Commander Class (CD) for her outstanding contribution to the arts. In 1997 she was inducted into the Jamaica Jazz Hall of Fame and in 2004 received the Prime Minister's award for Excellence in Theatre and Music.

Her brother Dwight Whylie (1936–2002) was a journalist and broadcaster.

== Publications ==
- Rhythm Kit #1 (1981), Jamaica School of Music.
- Folk Songs of Jamaica (1997), Ian Randle Publishers, ISBN 978-9768123237 – with Joy Fairclough.
- Our Musical Heritage: The Power of the Beat (2005), Grace Kennedy Foundation, ASIN B0017XF3X8.
- Jamaican Folk Song Suite (2022), Alfred Music.
