= Jackie Guy =

Jamaican dancer, choreographer, and educator

- Born: Carlton Guy; Jamaica
- Occupations: Dancer, choreographer, teacher
- Years active: 1960s–present
- Career
- Former groups: National Dance Theatre Company; University of the West Indies Dance Society; Kukuma Dance Company movements Dance Company

Carlton Harold "Jackie" Guy CD MBE is a Jamaican dancer, choreographer and teacher who has been based in the United Kingdom since the mid-1980s.

== Career ==
Guy grew up in the Harbour View area of Kingston and took up dancing as a boy, inspired by the film West Side Story. With his friends, he would watch Alma Mock Yen's dance group and was invited to join in 1964. While at Windward Road School he choreographed a dance based on a song by folklorist Louise Bennett-Coverley (Miss Lou), which was performed for her. He gave up dancing while he began a career as an accountant for RJR but soon returned to dance, taking lessons with Eddy Thomas and Rex Nettleford. Guy would later work with Bennett-Coverley in the 1967 pantomime Anancy and Pandora and the 1971 production Music Boy.

In 1968 Guy was invited to join Thomas and Nettleford's National Dance Theatre Company (NDTC), and was encouraged to develop his choreography and to take up teaching. He performed with the NDTC for 15 years, becoming principal dancer, and taught dance at the Social Development Commission, the Jamaica Cultural Development Commission, and the School of Dance. He was also director of the University of the West Indies Dance Society for almost 18 years.

After visiting England in 1985 and touring Britain with the NDTC in 1986, he relocated there in 1987 and has continued to teach in London, using his own "JaGuy Technique". In the UK he choreographed Yvonne Jones Brewster's production of Derek Walcott's O Babylon! and became the artistic director for Birmingham's Kokuma Dance Company, moving the group towards Caribbean styles. With Kokuma he won Black Dance Awards for Best Production and Best Choreography and the Prudential Award for Excellence, Innovation and Accessibility.

He went on to teach in universities and work in several major theatres, and choreographed the successful London stage version of Perry Henzell's The Harder They Come, which went on to tour internationally. He also taught in Zimbabwe as part of a British Council initiative. His Innings 84 Not Out, a tribute to his mother, was performed at the Royal Opera House in 2006. As a tribute to the recently deceased Bennett-Coverley he choreographed Only Fi Yuh in 2007 for the Movements Dance Company of Jamaica as part of the company's silver jubilee concert season.

In October 2011, Guy received a Lifetime Award from the Association of Dance of the African Diaspora (ADAD).

Guy was awarded the MBE in November 2012 in recognition of his outstanding contribution to dance education in the United Kingdom.

In 2013 he contributed Bankra, a reworking of a 1986 folk dance dealing with the cultural significance of the "bankra" (a large basket) that he originally created for the UWI Dance Society, to the NDTC's 51st season.

In 2015 it was announced that Guy would be awarded the Order of Distinction, Commander Class (CD) by the Jamaican government later that year.
