= The War Machines =

027 – The War Machines
- Doctor Who serial
- The Doctor faces down a War Machine as others retreat in a scene considered among the programme's best cliffhangers and a powerful moment for William Hartnell.

Cast
- Doctor: William Hartnell – First Doctor
- Companions: Jackie Lane – Dodo Chaplet; Anneke Wills – Polly; Michael Craze – Ben Jackson (Note: Craze also provided uncredited work as a policeman's voice for the fourth episode.)
- Others: Alan Curtis – Major Green; John Harvey – Professor Brett; Sandra Bryant – Kitty; Ewan Proctor – Flash; William Mervyn – Sir Charles Summer; John Cater – Professor Krimpton; Ric Felgate – American journalist; John Doye – Interviewer; Desmond Cullum-Jones, Eddie Davis – Workers; Roy Godfrey – Tramp; Michael Rathborne – Taxi-driver; Gerald Taylor – Machine Operator / Voice of WOTAN (Note: The voice of WOTAN was uncredited in the first three episodes.); John Rolfe – Captain; John Boyd-Brent – Sergeant; Frank Jarvis – Corporal; Robin Dawson – Soldier; Kenneth Kendall – Television Newsreader; George Cross – The Minister; Edward Colliver – Garage Mechanic; John Slavid – Man in telephone box; Dwight Whylie – Radio Announcer; Carl Conway – U.S. Correspondent

Production
- Directed by: Michael Ferguson
- Written by: Ian Stuart Black (Note: Based on an idea by Kit Pedler)
- Script editor: Gerry Davis
- Produced by: Innes Lloyd
- Music by: None (Note: The serial uses stock music, including tracks composed by Johnny Hawksworth and Eric Siday for the first episode, Trevor Duncan and Roberto Gerhard for the third, and Duncan for the fourth.)
- Production code: BB
- Series: Season 3
- Running time: 4 episodes, 25 minutes each
- Episode(s) missing: Material from 3–4
- First broadcast: 25 June 1966
- Last broadcast: 16 July 1966

Chronology
← Preceded by The Savages	Followed by → The Smugglers

The War Machines is the tenth and final serial of the third season of the British science fiction television series Doctor Who. Written by Ian Stuart Black and directed by Michael Ferguson, it was broadcast on BBC1 in four weekly parts from 25 June to 16 July 1966. In the serial, the First Doctor (William Hartnell) and his travelling companion, Dodo Chaplet (Jackie Lane), arrive in London shortly after the Post Office Tower was constructed. They meet secretary Polly (Anneke Wills) and sailor Ben Jackson (Michael Craze), and work to stop the sentient supercomputer WOTAN from invading London with its deadly War Machines.

Story editor Gerry Davis employed the academic Kit Pedler to develop the story idea. Scriptwriting duties were assigned to Pat Dunlop, who soon asked to be removed; he was replaced by Black, who also wrote the preceding serial. The War Machines is the programme's second serial set entirely on contemporary Earth. It marked the final appearance of Lane as Dodo, and the first appearance of Wills and Craze as Polly and Ben. Filming included extensive location shooting from May 1966, and the episodes were recorded in Riverside Studios from June to July.

The War Machines received an average of 5.2 million viewers across the four episodes, an improvement over its predecessor but low compared to the previous year. Reviews were largely positive, with praise for the setting, concept, performances, and new companions, though Dodo's departure was criticised. The videotapes and film prints were wiped by the BBC in the 1970s but subsequently recovered from collections, with some cuts for censorship. The story was novelised by Black, and the serial was released on VHS, DVD, and as an audiobook.

== Plot ==
The TARDIS lands in London, near the Post Office Tower, where the First Doctor and his travelling companion, Dodo Chaplet, meet Professor Brett, the creator of WOTAN (Will Operating Thought ANalogue). In four days, WOTAN will be linked to other major computers across the world to take them over. Dodo goes with Polly, Brett's secretary, to the Inferno nightclub, where they meet Ben Jackson, while the Doctor attends a Royal Scientific Club meeting about WOTAN, led by Sir Charles Summer. Before Brett can depart for the meeting, he is hypnotised by WOTAN. Major Green, the chief of security in the Tower, is also hypnotised, and sends WOTAN's control signals to Dodo at the nightclub via telephone.

Using its hypnotic control, WOTAN enlists a workforce to construct twelve robotic War Machines around London. One of these machines is built in a warehouse in Covent Garden, close to the nightclub. The next day, the Doctor telephones Brett at the Post Office Tower, and is nearly possessed by WOTAN. Thinking the Doctor is now controlled, Dodo reveals that the War Machines are being constructed in strategic points in London. The Doctor breaks WOTAN's control over her, and she is sent to stay with Sir Charles's wife to recover. The Doctor sends Ben to investigate the area around the nightclub, where he discovers a War Machine, now fully assembled. Ben is detected by the Machine and caught by the now hypnotised Polly. Ben learns that the War Machines are to attack the next day. He escapes and alerts the Doctor and Sir Charles. Polly is sent back to the Tower to be punished by WOTAN.

Under Sir Charles's instruction, an army task force investigates the warehouse. They are forced to retreat, but when the Doctor stands before the Machine, it stops, having not been completely programmed. Following reports of another War Machine taking to the streets, the Doctor traps the Machine in an electromagnetic forcefield and reprograms it to destroy WOTAN. Ben goes to the Post Office Tower and drags Polly out of WOTAN's room as the Machine enters and attacks the computer. WOTAN is destroyed, halting the other ten War Machines and breaking the hypnosis. Ben and Polly meet the Doctor at the TARDIS and explain that Dodo has decided to stay in London. The Doctor thanks them and heads into the TARDIS, shortly followed by Ben and Polly as it dematerialises.

== Production ==
=== Conception and writing ===
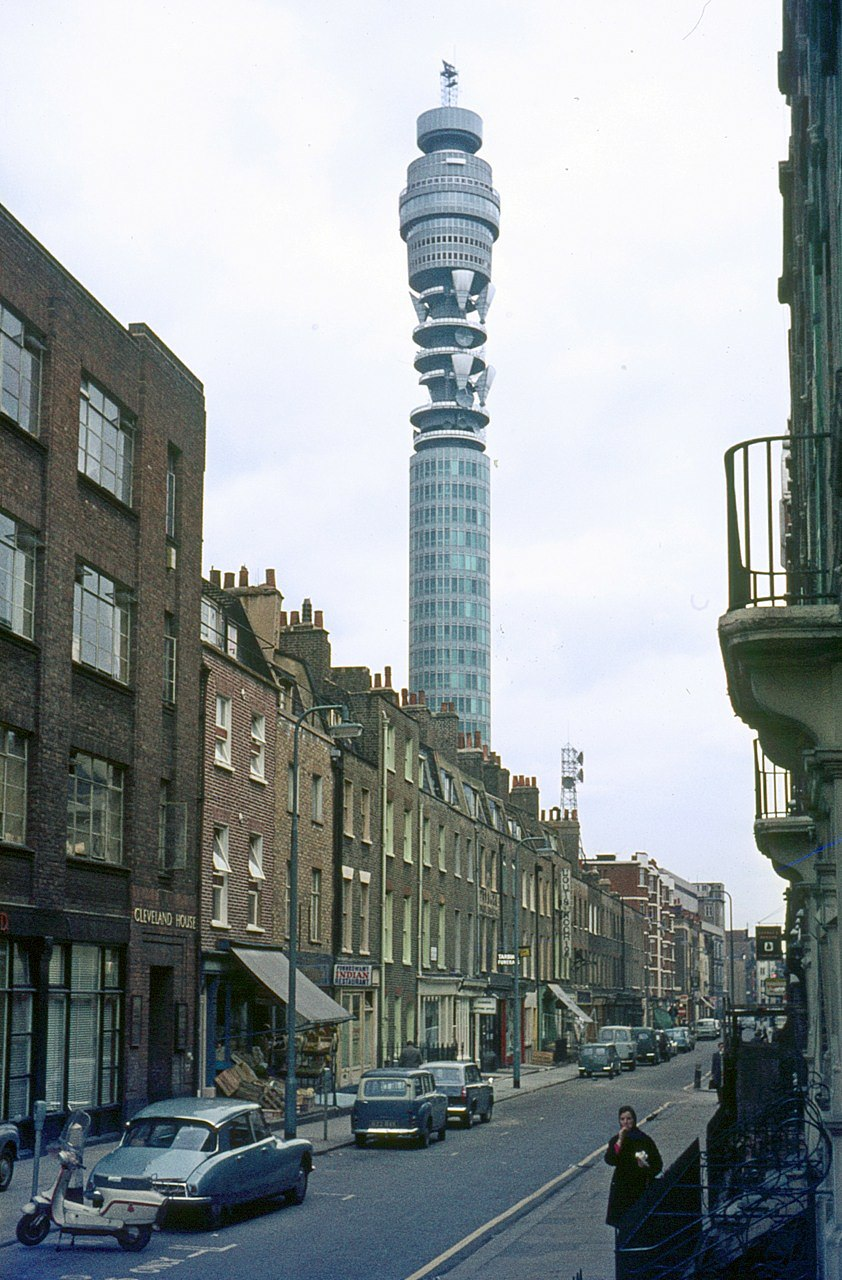
The War Machines centres on the recently constructed Post Office Tower in London.

After assuming their roles as Doctor Who's producer and story editor in early 1966, Innes Lloyd and Gerry Davis sought to phase out historical serials in favour of contemporary science-fiction, following the lower figures and mixed responses to The Myth Makers (1965) and The Massacre (1966). Davis sought a scientific consultant for the programme and met with several academics—including Alex Comfort, Eric Laithwaite, and Patrick Moore—but felt their ideas were too confined to scientific reality; conversely, Kit Pedler (an academic at the University of London with television experience) was more flexible, and enthusiastic about science fiction. Davis wanted a story in which the recently opened Post Office Tower "took over"; while most prospective writers had routine ideas, Pedler's concept of a rogue computer felt exciting, and an outline was created after one meeting. Pedler was paid £25 per episode (equivalent to £407 in 2025).

Scriptwriting duties for the story, titled Doctor Who and the Computers, were assigned to Pat Dunlop, a staff writer at the BBC; Davis commissioned him to write the four scripts by 4 April 1966. After completing a draft for the first episode by mid-March, Dunlop asked to be removed from the serial to work on scripts for United! and consulting for Dixon of Dock Green. (Note: Dunlop's fee for his work on the storyline came out of the first episode's budget.) Davis subsequently assigned the story to Ian Stuart Black, who had recently completed his scripts for the preceding serial, The Savages (1966). Black was the first writer (and one of only three in the programme's original run) (Note: Other writers who worked on two consecutive Doctor Who serials within the same season include Chris Boucher (1977's The Face of Evil and The Robots of Death) and David Fisher (1978's The Stones of Blood and The Androids of Tara).) to pen two consecutive serials. He was formally commissioned on 15 March with the same due date, but soon given more time to accommodate Davis and Lloyd's changes to the companions; Black delivered the four scripts for Doctor Who and the War Machines on 21 March, 30 March, 7 April, and 28 April, respectively.

The War Machines was the first time the lead character had been directly called "Doctor Who"; Black believed it was his name, not "the Doctor", and Davis did not alter this in the scripts. The serial was the programme's second set entirely on contemporary Earth, after Planet of Giants (1964), and it established a story type that became commonplace with the programme in the early 1970s. It was Davis and Lloyd's first original story, having adopted the preceding serials from their predecessors. Michael Ferguson was assigned the serial's director; he had previously worked as assistant floor manager on The Daleks (1963–1964), on which he had controlled the Dalek's arm in the first episode. In preparation for The War Machines, Ferguson watched the film Machines Like Men on 25 April, (Note: Ferguson also invited producer Innes Lloyd and designer Raymond London to attend the screening of Machines Like Men at Lime Grove Studios, though whether they attended is unknown.) spoke to representatives at ICT Limited on 28 April, and visited IBM in Hammersmith. The War Machines was the first Doctor Who story to feature a sentient supercomputer, later a science-fiction staple.

Four pieces of animation were created as opening title credits for each episode, with sound effects taken from a BBC effects disc. The pulsing sound effect for WOTAN (Note: The scripts occasionally misspelled "WOTAN" as "WOTEN" and "WOTON".) was a generic mechanic sound effect, also used in Goldfinger (1964). Raymond London was assigned the serial's designer, his first work for the programme. The War Machine prop was designed by Shawcraft Models; only one was made, with its identification number swapped in different scenes to indicate a higher population. The machine was operated by Gerald Taylor, who had previously operated the Daleks since their first appearance in 1963 and the Zarbi in The Web Planet (1965). Taylor also provided the voice of WOTAN, using a stock effect with heavy echo and distortion. Lloyd told London that he considered the War Machines a potential replacement of the Daleks for the programme. Costumes were handled by Daphne Dare and Barbara Lane, and make-up by Sonia Markham. Polly's outfit was sourced from Marimekko by actress Anneke Wills, as the BBC did not use designer clothing. The serial used stock music to offset its budget due to the extensive film sequences.

=== Casting and characters ===
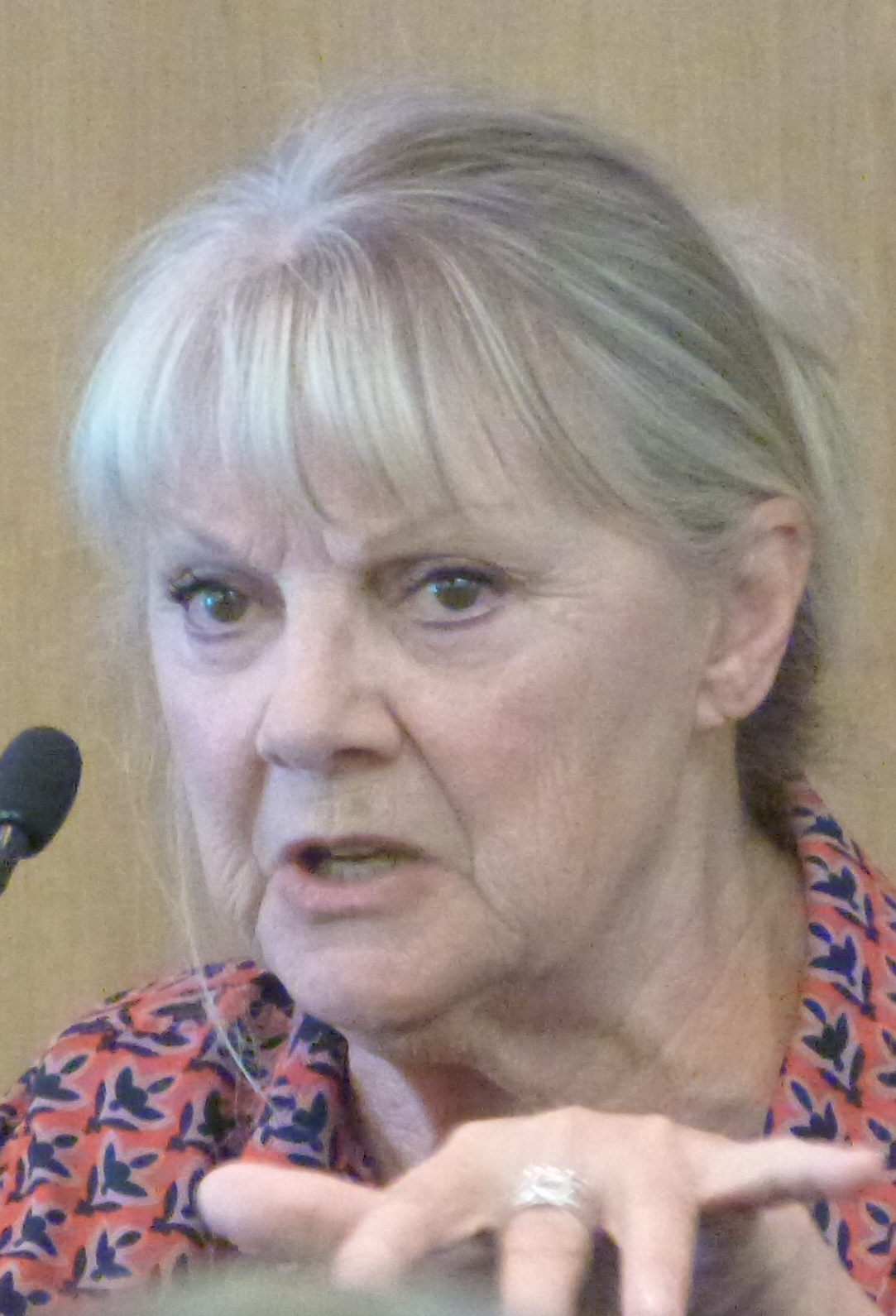
The War Machines marked the first appearance of Anneke Wills (pictured in 2018) as one of the new companions, Polly.

The War Machines was the first instance of the Doctor (portrayed by William Hartnell) participating in everyday activities, such as hailing taxis and visiting institutions, rather than interacting with historical figures or futuristic civilisations. The serial marked the final appearance of Jackie Lane as Dodo Chaplet; Lloyd chose not to renew Lane's contract, following the recent departure of Peter Purves as Steven Taylor in the preceding serial. Lloyd wanted two contemporary companions to make the programme relatable, partly inspired by the popularity of The Man from U.N.C.L.E. and the James Bond films. Ben and Polly are 24-year-olds from Swinging London, the former an able seaman with the Royal Navy and the latter an intelligent but impulsive woman whose trendy outfits echoed Julie Christie and Marianne Faithfull. In the first outline, Ben, named "Rich", initially quarrelled with Dodo before they became attracted to each other.

Anneke Wills and Michael Craze were cast as Polly and Ben by early May and offered contracts for four serials (18 episodes) on 25 and 26 May, respectively. They sought to discuss the characters with Hartnell and Ferguson. Wills recalled that her husband, Michael Gough, had enjoyed his time working on the serial The Celestial Toymaker (1966), though he warned her that Hartnell may be difficult to work with. She considered playing the role with a posh debutante accent, but the idea was soon dropped. Wills and Craze became close friends during production; Craze temporarily lived with Wills and Gough for six weeks after being cast, unable to find other accommodation. Hartnell tried to help the new cast settle in, but they had different approaches to working; Craze struggled to relate to Hartnell.

Ferguson cast several guest actors he had worked with, as the BBC did not use casting directors. William Mervyn was the serial's primary guest star, cast as Sir Charles Summer. The character, originally named Sir Robert, was inspired by Inspector Lestrade in the Sherlock Holmes stories: unimaginative and opposed to receiving advice. Ferguson had recently directed Mervyn in an episode of The Flying Swan (1965) alongside John Cater and John Boyd-Brent, who he cast as Professor Krimpton and the army sergeant, respectively. He had also worked with John Harvey (who portrayed Professor Brett) on several projects. Ferguson cast Dwight Whylie as a radio announcer as his voice was immediately recognisable; the head of presentation at BBC Radio, Andrew Timothy, agreed to release Whylie for recording on 7 June. Ric Felgate, then Ferguson's brother-in-law and husband to Cynthia Felgate, was cast as an American journalist. Mike Reid appeared uncredited as a soldier; he had previously appeared in the film Dr. Who and the Daleks (1965) and later portrayed his EastEnders character Frank Butcher in the crossover special Dimensions in Time (1993).

=== Filming ===
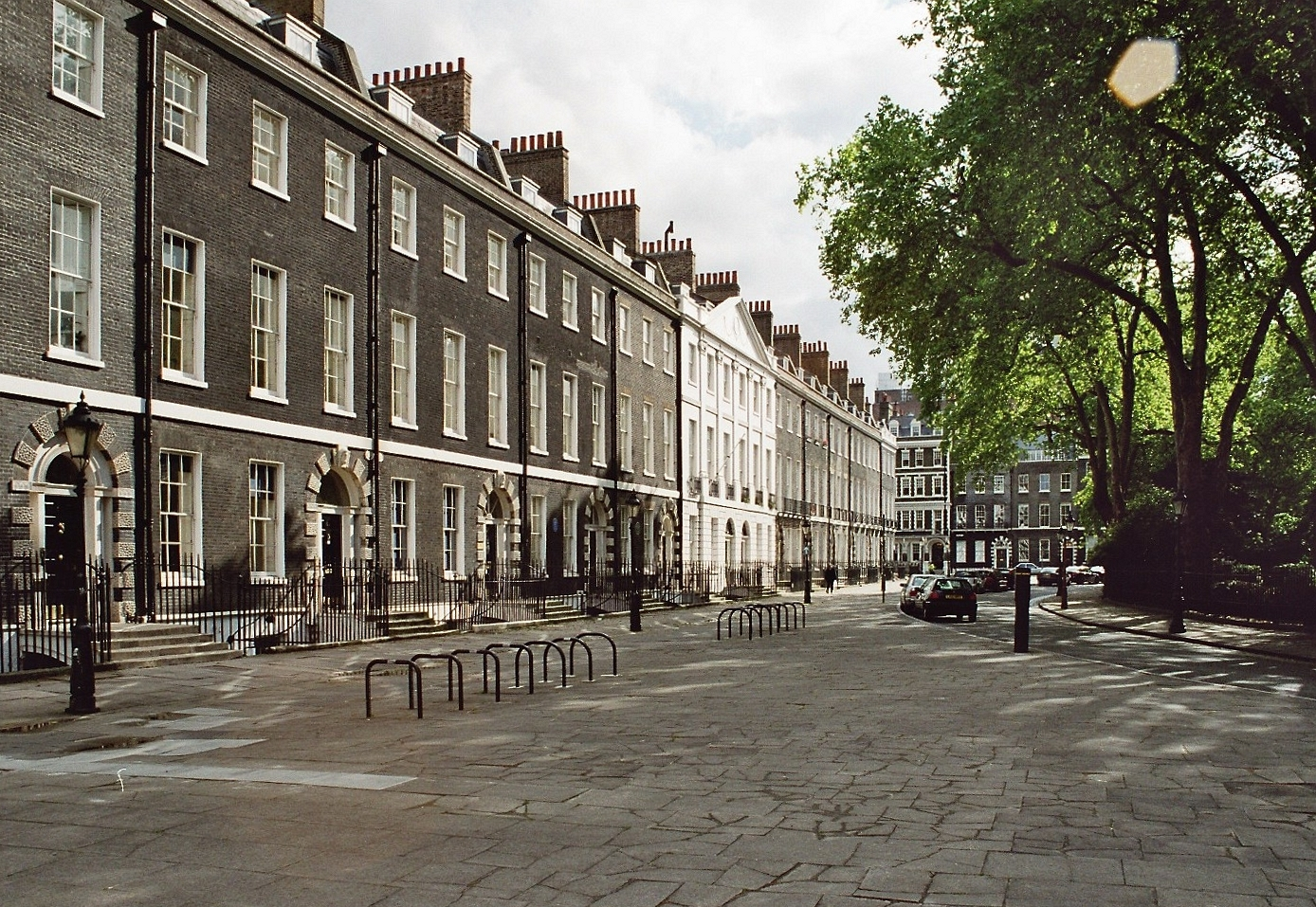
Filming for The War Machines took place at several locations, including in Bedford Square (pictured in 2005) when permission was denied to use the Post Office Tower.

Rehearsals for the film sequences took place on 20 May 1966, and early filming began on 22 May in London. Hartnell and Lane were released from rehearsals for The Savages for filming, soon joined by Wills and Craze. It was Ferguson's first location shoot as a director, and he was assisted by cameraman Alan Jones. The General Post Office had denied permission to film from the Post Office Tower; the opening shot of the TARDIS was instead filmed in Bedford Square from Centre Point with permission from the company George Wimpey. The actor Peter Stewart was mistaken for a real police officer, with one bystander asking for directions. A taxi driver, W. Bussell, drove his own taxicab for one scene and was paid £2.10. Journalists visited to take photographs, particularly of the War Machine, as location shooting was rare for the programme at the time. Further early filming took place at Ealing Studios from 23 to 25 May; the scripts had indicated that these scenes would be filmed in the regular studio sessions, but Ferguson opted to record them in the pre-filming period.

Further location shooting took place on 26 May, including at Covent Garden market in the morning. Hartnell joined the crew in the afternoon for scenes filmed at Cornwall Gardens. Weekly four-day rehearsals for the serial started on 6 June, and recording took place in Studio 1 of Riverside Studios each Friday from 10 June. The TARDIS appears differently in some successive shots in the first episode, as the prop had undergone some refurbishment between the location and studio recordings. Craze performed additional voice recording as a policeman for the fourth episode on 29 June at Lime Grove Studios. The final episode was recorded on 1 July; it was filmed out of sequence to allow scenes with the War Machine prop to be filmed together. By this time, Hartnell's departure from the programme in October had been organised. The first episode was budgeted at £3,205 but cost more, while the rest were budgeted at £2,575 each to compensate; recording cost a total of £11,612 (Note: The four episodes cost £5,098, £2,355, £2,069, and £2,090, respectively.) (equivalent to £188,879 in 2025).

== Reception ==
=== Broadcast and ratings ===
Episode	Title	Run time	Original release date	UK viewers (millions)	Appreciation Index
1	"Episode 1"	24:01	25 June 1966	5.4	49
2	"Episode 2"	24:00	2 July 1966	4.7	45
3	"Episode 3"	23:58	9 July 1966	5.3	44
4	"Episode 4"	23:11	16 July 1966	5.5	39

The War Machines was broadcast on BBC1 in four weekly parts from 25 June to 16 July 1966. The first and third episodes were broadcast in their usual 5:35 p.m. timeslot, while the second episode aired later at 6:55 p.m. due to the Wimbledon finals, and the fourth aired earlier at 5:15 p.m. (in Juke Box Jury's timeslot) due to Royal Tournament coverage later. The War Machines was the final serial of the programme's third season; a trailer for the following serial, The Smugglers (1966), was broadcast after the fourth episode. Viewership for The War Machines saw an improvement over The Savages, with an average of 5.2 million across the four episodes, though its charts positions were low in comparison to the preceding year. The serial was promoted in a segment on Blue Peter, one of the earliest partnerships between the programmes.

The serial was sold overseas from the mid-1960s, (Note: It was broadcast in Australia in April 1967, Barbados and Zambia in 1968, New Zealand in 1969, Sierra Leone in 1970, Singapore in February 1972, Nigeria in 1973, the United States in the 1980s, and Canada in 1990.) requiring some cuts for the Australian and New Zealand broadcasts. The BBC wiped the original tapes in March 1974, among the last of Hartnell's stories to be wiped, and the 16 mm telerecordings were among the last to be destroyed in early 1978. A private collector in Australia recovered the film print of the second episode in the late 1970s—the first missing Doctor Who episode to be recovered. All four episodes, with some cuts for censorship (taken from the New Zealand prints), were discovered at a television station in Nigeria in 1984. The censored fragments—136 seconds from the third episode and 17 seconds from the fourth—remain missing but have been reconstructed using other footage and audio. The serial was screened at the National Film Theatre on 12 July 1986, and later aired on UK Gold in episodic and omnibus formats from January 1993. It is Hartnell's last serial and Polly and Ben's only story without any missing episodes.

=== Critical response ===
Some critics considered the serial's depiction of the supercomputer WOTAN forward-thinking, predating similar concepts in media (Note: James Chapman compared the serial's omnipotent supercomputer to similar depictions in the films 2001: A Space Odyssey (1968), Colossus: The Forbin Project (1969), and Demon Seed (1967), as well as the Star Trek episodes "The Changeling" and "The Ultimate Computer" (both 1967), and others similarly compared it to The Terminator (1984).) and real technologies.

The Stage and Television Today's Bill Norris called The War Machines "one of the better" stories, enjoying the performances of Mervyn, Harvey, Cater, and Alan Curtis and "the look" of Polly and Ben. An Audience Research Report had a mixed response: many found the concept "preposterous", the ending anticlimactic, and the programme had "little or no appeal"; conversely, some viewers, particularly children, enjoyed the serial, finding it frightening and appreciating the contemporary setting. The Appreciation Index scores were low, with an average of 44 and a nadir of 39 for the fourth episode. Doctor Who Magazine (DWM) readers ranked The War Machines among the top half of the First Doctor's serials (Note: Of the First Doctor's 29 stories, The War Machines was voted 6th in 1998, 12th in 2009 and 2014, and 8th in 2023.) and near the middle of the programme's stories overall. (Note: The War Machines was voted 56th of 159 total stories in 1998, 108th of 200 in 2009, and 133rd of 241 in 2014.)

Several critics found the contemporary setting refreshing and respectable; The Telegraph's Ben Lawrence named it among the programme's best contemporary stories. Piers D. Britton noted it set a new precedent, and Mark Clapham, Eddie Robson, and Jim Smith felt it pushed the programme to be "frequently defined by the sources it drew from". Peter Haining thought it represented Doctor Who adjusting its audience from children to teenagers as it "formally entered the swinging sixties". IGN's Arnold T. Blumberg wrote that "this is where modern Doctor Who actually begins". Danny Nicol recognised that the serial criticised the abuse of governmental power, instead of private institutions as in later stories. Some critics considered WOTAN's use of 1960s telecoms technology to create a network of sentient machines forward-thinking, predating similar concepts (later a popular trope) in film and television and real technologies like ARPANET and the Internet.

Several reviewers praised Hartnell's role in the serial, especially in the third episode's ending, which The A.V. Club's Christopher Bahn called "magnetic"; some deemed the cliffhanger among the programme's best, and DWM's Mark Wright called it an "iconic hero shot" that would later become common in the programme. IGN's Blumberg considered The War Machines an effective showcase for Hartnell, calling him "commanding and magnetic ... but often lost" and "out of touch", and Mark Campbell called his performance "erratic". Wills and Craze's performances were praised; Den of Geek's Alex Westthorp found them "more naturalistic" than Lane's "rather stagy" work. The A.V. Club's Bahn called the new companions "the liveliest and most interesting characters in the story", appreciating Ben's heroism. Many reviewers considered Dodo's departure the worst of any companion and felt Lane was denied a proper exit from the programme; Valerie Estelle Frankel noted, like her introduction in The Massacre, Dodo's departure was "treated with little fanfare".

Total Sci-Fi Online's Jonathan Wilkins named The War Machines "something of a forgotten masterpiece", though considered the machines too dull to impress children over the Daleks. DVD Talk's J. Doyle Wallis called it "serviceable" but unmemorable, citing the lack of depth and personality in WOTAN and its henchmen. Mark Campbell appreciated the action scenes and War Machine's design. Clapham, Robson, and Smith enjoyed Ferguson's direction and the effective production, and David J. Howe and Stephen James Walker liked the concept but considered some elements unrealistic and confusing. The A.V. Club's Bahn appreciated the serial's "B-movie sensibility", and DWM's Vanessa Bishop felt it "does a good job of evoking the feeling of a city under siege" but found some conversations unrealistic. Radio Times's Patrick Mulkern similarly considered the dialogue "clunky" and the plotting unrealistic, though he appreciated the change signalled for the programme, particularly in Polly and Ben's introduction.

== Commercial releases ==
The War Machines
- Author: Ian Stuart Black
- Cover artist: Alister Pearson; Graeme Wey
- Series: Doctor Who book: Target novelisations
- Release number: 136
- Publisher: Target Books
- Publication date: 16 February 1989
- ISBN: 0-426-20332-1

A novelisation of The War Machines was written by Black based on his original scripts, preferring not to let other writers adapt them; he expanded the story by giving names to some War Machines. It was published by Target Books on 16 February 1989, with a cover by Alister Pearson and Graeme Wey. An audiobook of the novelisation, read by Michael Cochrane, was published on 7 March 2019.

The serial's audio was released on CD by BBC Audiobooks in August 2007, with narration by Wills; it was included in The Lost TV Episodes: Collection Six by AudioGO on 5 September 2013, featuring an interview with Wills and the original camera scripts. Harlequin Miniatures released metal figures of Polly and Ben in August 1998, and models of the War Machines in 2000.

The War Machines was the first Doctor Who video project overseen by the Doctor Who Restoration Team in late 1996, with the missing elements reconstructed using existing video and audio material, including sound by Mark Ayres. Ferguson admired the Restoration Team's dedication to restoring his work. Delivered under budget, it was released on VHS by BBC Video on 2 June 1997, (Note: Around 400 VHS copies were rendered unplayable due to a duplication error.) and on DVD by 2 Entertain on 25 August 2008. (Note: The DVD release had originally been scheduled to release on 29 September 2008, but was brought forward a month to take the place of The Trial of a Time Lord's release.) The latter included an audio commentary with Wills and Ferguson, and short documentaries about the locations and restoration. Reviewers enjoyed the DVD's presentation and restoration but found the extras light or lacklustre, though Den of Geek's Westthorp appreciated the commentary and features. The serial was released as part of Eaglemoss's Doctor Who DVD Files in June 2014, and added to BBC iPlayer alongside most other serials on 1 November 2023.

== Bibliography ==
- Britton, Piers D. (2021). Design for Doctor Who. Bloomsbury Academic. ISBN 978-1-350-11682-5.
- Brown, J. P. C. (2011). "Doctor Who: A Very British Alien". In Neighbors, R. C.; Rankin, Sandy (eds.). The Galaxy is Rated G: Essays on Children's Science Fiction Film and Television. McFarland & Company. pp. 161–182. ISBN 978-0-786-45875-2.
- Brunt, David (10 May 2024). The Doctor Who Production Diary: The Hartnell Years. Telos Publishing. ISBN 978-1-845-83222-3.
- Burk, Graeme; Smith?, Robert (2013). Who's 50: The 50 Doctor Who Stories to Watch Before You Die. ECW Press. ISBN 978-1-770-41166-1.
- Burk, Graeme; Smith?, Robert (1 September 2015). The Doctors Are In: The Essential and Unofficial Guide to Doctor Who's Greatest Time Lord. ECW/ORIM. ISBN 978-1-770-90782-9.
- Campbell, Mark (2010). Doctor Who: The Episode Guide. Pocket Essentials. ISBN 978-1-84243-660-8.
- Chapman, James (2006). Inside the TARDIS: The Worlds of Doctor Who (2013 ed.). I.B. Tauris. ISBN 978-1-780-76140-4.
- Clapham, Mark; Robson, Eddie; Smith, Jim (2005). Who's Next: An Unofficial Guide to Doctor Who. Virgin Books. ISBN 978-0-753-50948-7.
- Cornell, Paul; Day, Martin; Topping, Keith (1995). The Discontinuity Guide. London: Virgin Books. ISBN 0-426-20442-5.
- Frankel, Valerie Estelle (2018). Women in Doctor Who: Damsels, Feminists and Monsters. Jefferson: McFarland & Company. ISBN 978-1-493-00016-6.
- Haining, Peter (1983). Doctor Who: A Celebration – Two Decades Through Time and Space. W.H. Allen. ISBN 0-491-03351-6.
- Hall, Alexander (2021). Evolution on British Television and Radio. Palgrave Macmillan. ISBN 978-3-030-83043-4. ISSN 2731-4367.
- Harmes, Marcus K. (2014). Doctor Who and the Art of Adaptation. Rowman & Littlefield. ISBN 978-1-442-23284-6.
- Hayward, Philip; Fitzgerald, Jon (2012). "Rematerialization: Musical Engagements with the British TV Series Doctor Who". In Donnelly, K. J.; Hayward, Philip (eds.). Music in Science Fiction Television: Tuned to the Future. Routledge. pp. 135–150. doi:10.4324/9780203076330. ISBN 978-0-415-64107-4.
- Howe, David J.; Walker, Stephen James (2013). Doctor Who: The Television Companion. Vol. 1 (2021 ed.). London: Telos Publishing. ISBN 978-1-845-83156-1.
- Howe, David J.; Walker, Stephen James; Stammers, Mark (1994). Doctor Who: The Handbook – The First Doctor (1995 ed.). London: Telos Publishing. ISBN 0-426-20430-1.
- Howe, David J.; Walker, Stephen James; Stammers, Mark (2005). Doctor Who: The Handbook. Vol. 1 (2016 ed.). London: Telos Publishing. ISBN 978-1-845-83941-3.
- Molesworth, Richard (2 July 1997). Gillatt, Gary (ed.). "1966 and All That". Doctor Who Magazine. No. 253. Marvel Comics. pp. 6–12. ISSN 0957-9818.
- Muir, John Kenneth (1999). A Critical History of Doctor Who on Television. Jefferson, North Carolina: McFarland & Company. ISBN 978-0-786-40442-1.
- Nicol, Danny (2 February 2018). Doctor Who: A British Alien?. Palgrave Macmillan Cham. doi:10.1007/978-3-319-65834-6. ISBN 978-3-319-65834-6.
- Norton, Charles (May 2015). Spilsbury, Tom (ed.). "The Golden Age of Videotape!". Doctor Who Magazine. No. 487. Panini Magazines. pp. 50–58. ISSN 0957-9818.
- Robb, Brian J. (2013). Timeless Adventures: How Doctor Who Conquered TV. Kamera Books. ISBN 978-1-843-44156-4.
- Stanish, Deborah (13 November 2012). "Anything Goes". In Stanish, Deborah; Myles, L.M. (eds.). Chicks Unravel Time: Women Journey Through Every Season of Doctor Who. Mad Norwegian Press. pp. 224–230. ISBN 978-1-935-23412-8.
- Wright, Mark, ed. (7 September 2016). "The Savages, The War Machines, The Smugglers and The Tenth Planet". Doctor Who: The Complete History. 8 (27). London: Panini Comics, Hachette Partworks. ISSN 2057-6048.

=== Home media resources ===
- Bignell, Richard (compiler) (25 August 2008). The War Machines (Production Information Subtitles). 2 Entertain.
- Ferguson, Michael; Wills, Anneke (25 August 2008). The War Machines (audio commentary). 2 Entertain.
