= Soncino =

Soncino may refer to:

== Places ==
- Soncino, Lombardy, a comune of the Province of Cremona, Italy

== People ==
- Soncino family (printers), an Italian family of Jewish printers
- Scipione Barbò Soncino (or Scipione Barbuo), a 16th-century Italian jurist and writer, active in Padua

== Other uses ==
- Battle of Soncino, a battle in the Wars in Lombardy fought in 1431
- Soncino Books of the Bible, a set of Hebrew Bible commentaries
- Soncino Press, a modern English publisher specialising in Jewish subjects
