= Ordnance Survey International =

OS collection for former British colonies

- Formation: 1946
- Dissolved: 2001
- Type: GO
- Purpose: Provided a central survey and mapping organisation for British colonies and protectorates
- Headquarters: Southampton
- Parent organization: Ordnance Survey
- Staff: None

The Ordnance Survey International or Ordnance Survey Overseas Directorate its predecessors built an archive of air photography, map and survey records for the United Kingdom from 1946 to 1999. The Ordnance Survey International Collection (formerly the Ordnance Survey International Library) held mapping records that were acquired outside the UK.

Although the international division opened in 1946, the OS had been involved in overseas work for almost a century (notably the 1864-65 Ordnance Survey of Jerusalem).

The agency was closed in 2001.

== History ==
=== The agency ===
In 1946 the Directorate of Colonial Surveys (DCS) was established by the Colonial Office to provide a central survey and mapping organisation for British colonies and protectorates. In 1957, with the imminent decolonisation of many British territories, it was renamed the Directorate of Overseas Surveys (DOS). Government reviews during the 1970s led to it being merging into the Ordnance Survey (OS) in 1984 whence it was known as the Overseas Surveys Directorate (OSD).

In 1991, following completion of the last significant aid-funded mapping projects, its name was changed one final time to Ordnance Survey International and its main activity became consultancy, primarily in Eastern Europe. It was closed in 2001.

=== The archive ===
The aerial photographs, maps and survey data were originally kept in separate libraries but were amalgamated in 1984 into a single collection called Technical Information and Support Services. In 1991 this was renamed the Ordnance Survey International Library. In 2002 it was decided that it was no longer needed and responsibility for its disposal was passed to The National Archives. During 2003 and 2004 The National Archives, the Ordnance Survey and advisers from specialist bodies jointly appraised the collection to determine which records should be kept and by which custodians. The collection was dispersed during 2004.

Since 2012, the archive has been held within the National Collection of Aerial Photography (NCAP), and includes some 1.7 million aerial photographs alongside cover traces, maps and annual reports. Having rescued the collection from the defunct British Empire and Commonwealth Museum, NCAP are now cataloguing and digitising the collection. In 2014, a 16-minute Scottish Documentary Institute film entitled 'Sightlines' used photography from the collection to explore the legacy of 20th century aerial survey in Mwatate, Kenya. The film was created as part of Creative Scotland's 'Culture 2014' programme, and premiered at the Edinburgh International Film Festival.

To date, a small amount of material from the collection has been made available via the NCAP website, primarily relating to the 2014 documentary. Examples of photography from the collection are also displayed, showing the types of terrain and remote communities which were mapped for the first time by DOS.

== Mapping ==
During its lifetime the agency provided mapping to almost all the British colonies and protectorates. In addition, some non-Commonwealth countries were mapped between 1975 and 1991 including Ethiopia, Liberia, Sudan and Yemen.

Aerial photography and photogrammetry were used with photography missions being flown primarily by United Kingdom air survey companies. Agency surveyors were sent abroad to establish horizontal and vertical ground control for the photography; this was permanently marked and co-ordinated so that the surveys could be the basis for future work.

After a map was compiled from the photography, a plot (draft) was made for checking and annotation by the local survey department of the country concerned. The final map was drawn at agency headquarters and printed by the Ordnance Survey.

== Other roles ==
In addition to its primary map making role the agency was responsible for:

- Provision of advice to the Overseas Development Agency and foreign governments and organisations on technical matters concerning all aspects of surveying and mapping.
- Dissemination of information about new techniques related to surveying, photogrammetry, and cartography.

== Directors General ==
Director	From
Martin Hotine	1946-03-11
G J Humphries	1963-10-10
W D C Wiggins	1965-10-01
D E Warren	1968-05-31
B E Furmston	1979–06

Reference.

== See also ==
- Ordnance Survey
- List of maps of Jamaica#The 1:50,000 series
- Alastair Macdonald
