= List of museums in Jamaica =

A list of museums in Jamaica.

- Bank of Jamaica Currency Museum
- Bob Marley Mausoleum
- Bob Marley Museum
- Bustamante Museum
- Cecil Charlton Park
- Firefly Estate
- Fort Charles Museum
- Fort Charlotte
- Fort George
- Fort Haldane
- Jamaica Music Museum
- Hanover Museum
- Liberty Hall: The Legacy of Marcus Garvey
- [Michael Manley Foundation]
- Military Museum
- Museum of St. James
- National Gallery of Jamaica
- Natural History Museum of Jamaica
- Peoples’ Museum of Craft and Technology
- Peter Tosh Museum
- Sir Noël Coward Museum
- Taino Museum of the First Jamaicans
- Trench Town Culture Yard
