= Jamaican Georgian architecture =

Jamaican Georgian architecture is an architectural style that was popular in Jamaica between c. 1750 and c. 1850. It married the elegance of Georgian styling with functional features designed to weather Jamaica's tropical climate. It was used at all levels in society, from the most important public buildings to humble domestic dwellings.

There is a related style of furniture.

Many of Jamaica's railway stations were constructed in this style.

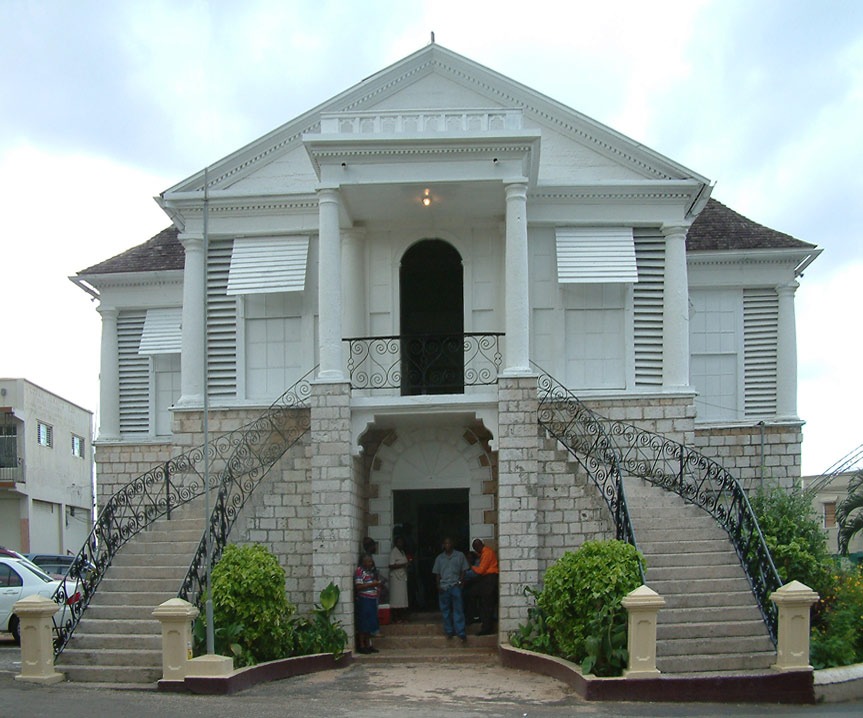
The Court House, Mandeville, Jamaica

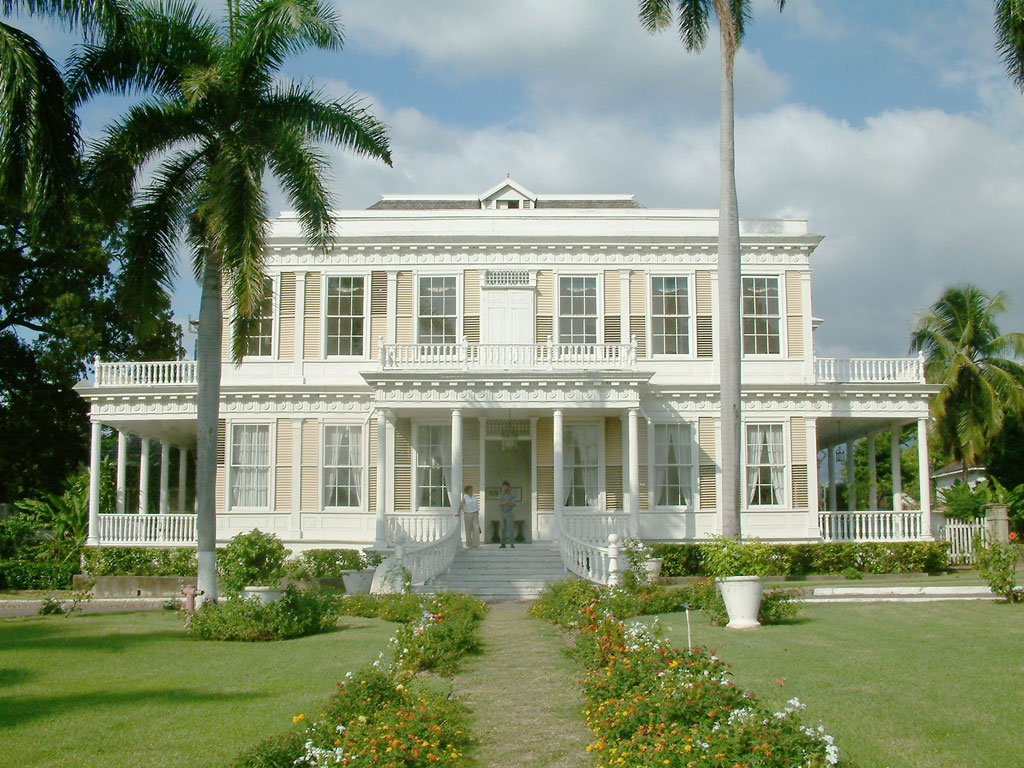
Devon House, Kingston, Jamaica. A classic example of Jamaican Georgian architecture

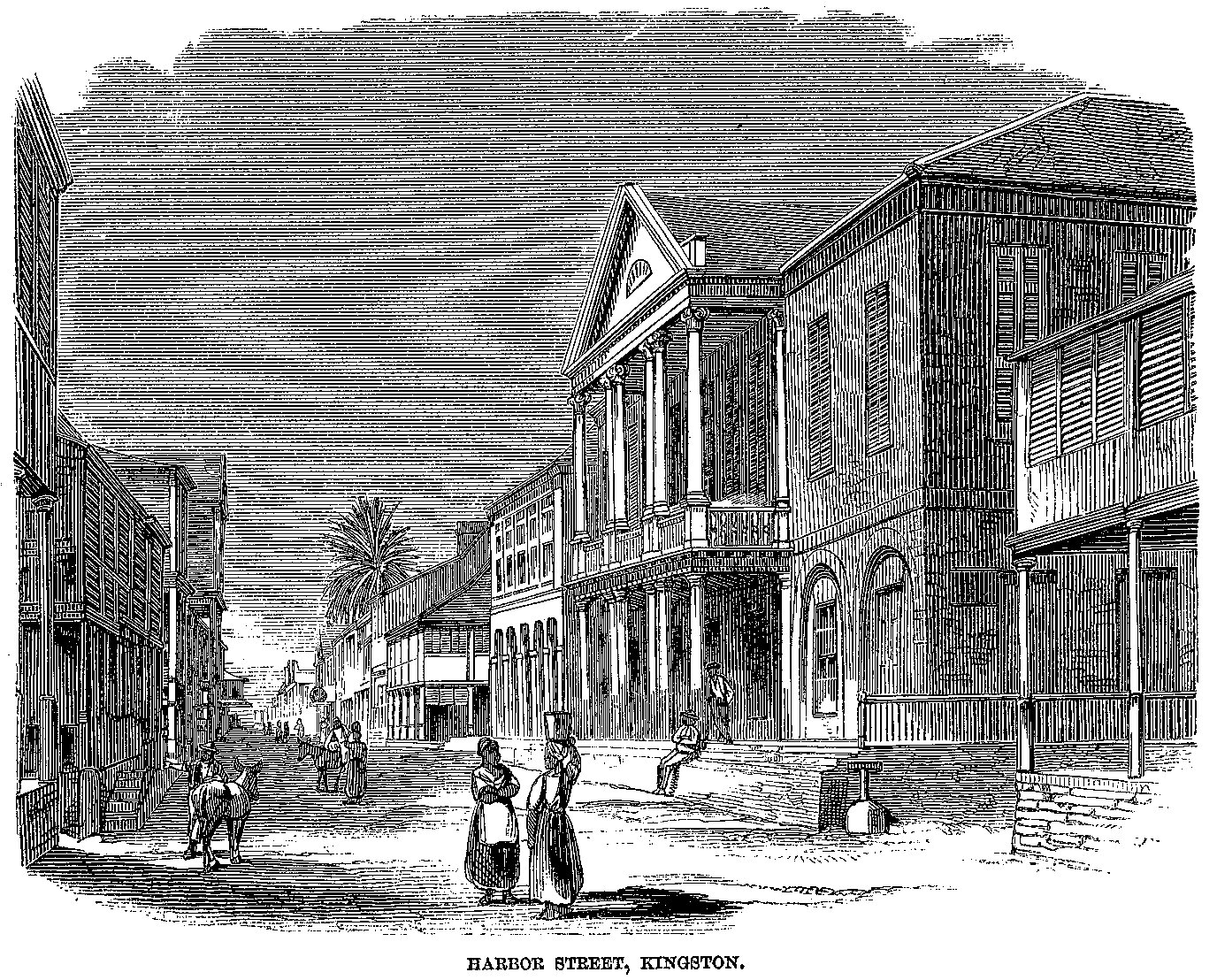
Harbour Street, Kingston, Jamaica, 1861

== See also ==
- Georgian architecture
- Culture of Jamaica#Woodwork, furniture, and metalwork
