= Bruckins =

Bruckins, also spelled brukins, is a Jamaican dance performed primarily to celebrate Emancipation Day.

A dance, whose music has both European and African elements, Bruckins is a "stately, dipping-gliding" dance, and may be derived from the Pavane.

Bruckins is accompanied by an elaborate pageant, in which participants dress as European royalty and/or members of the royal court (courtiers, pages, soldiers, etc.).

Sabine Sörgel has said that the first Bruckins was celebrated in 1834, after the formal abolition of slavery; however, Olive Lewin states that the first Bruckins was only in 1839, after the elimination of the "apprenticeship" system.
