= Girolamo Porro =

Italian painter

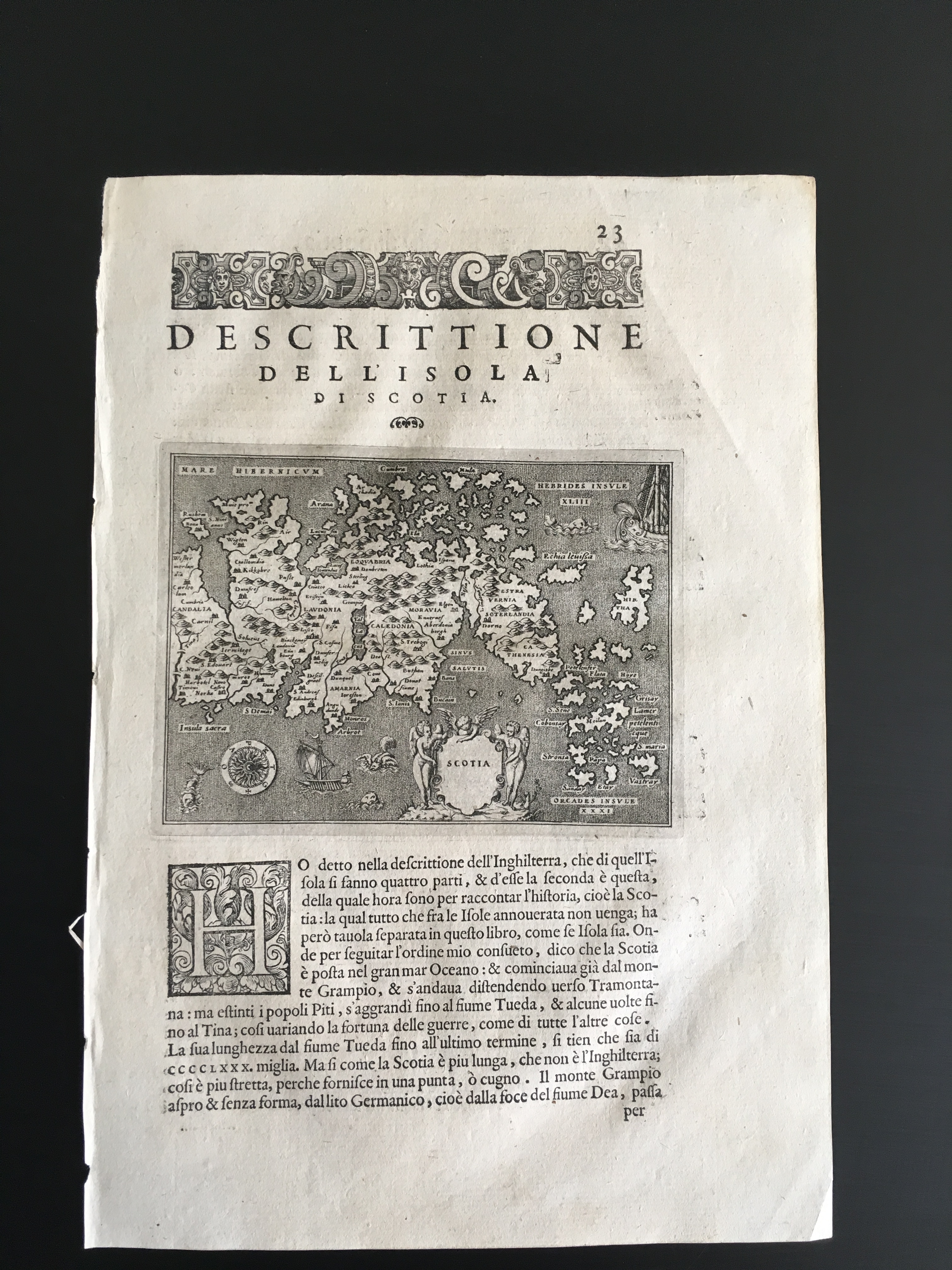
Porro's Map of Scotland in Tomaso Porcacchi Castilione's 'L'Isole piu Famose del Mondo', Venice 1572

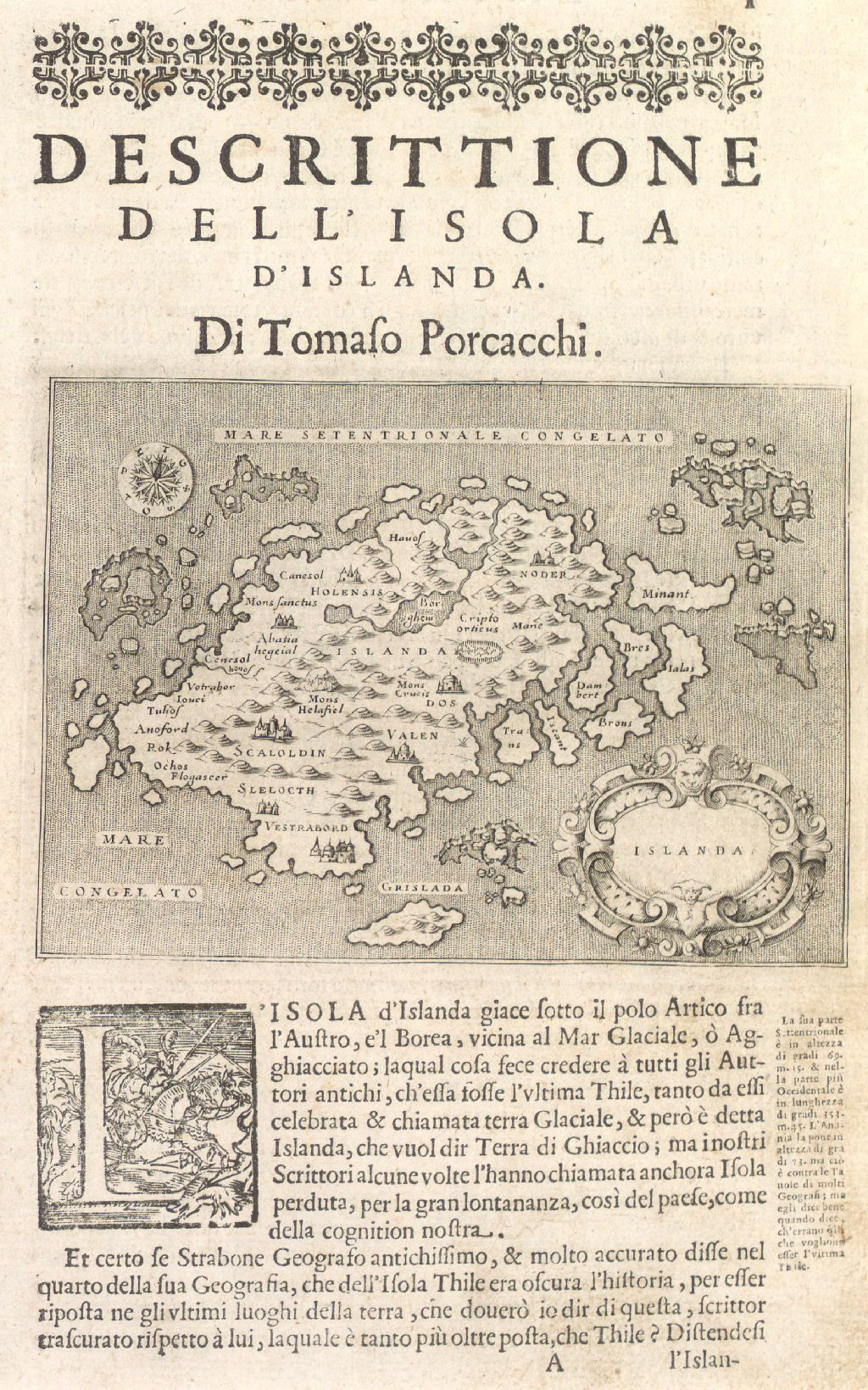
Girolamo Porro, Antique map of Iceland, from the National and University Library of Iceland and the Central Bank of Iceland (1572)

Girolamo Porro (c. 1520 - after 1604) was an Italian engraver on wood and on copper. He was born at Padua and spent most of his working career in Venice. He engraved for a book entitled Imprese illustri di diversi, published by Camillo Camilli in 1535. He executed the plates for the Orlando Furioso of Ariosto, published at Venice in 1584; for the Funerali antichi di diversi Popoli et Natione, by Tommaso Porcacchi, published in 1574; and the portraits for the Sommario delle Vite do' Duchi di Milano by Scipione Barbuo, in 1574. The maps in Girolamo Ruscelli's translation of the Geographia of Ptolemy, 1574, and the maps in Porcacchi's Isole piu famose del Mondo, first published in 1572, are likewise by him.
