= Mauger (Jamaican Patois term) =

Mauger or also known as mawga the Jamaican Patois word for 'meagre', is a term used in rural Jamaica for a thin woman. In Jamaica, plumpness is considered to be important or vital to good health. The desired body is plump, full of vital bodily fluids, and the flow of substances through the body is maintained, both of which are contributing factors to good health. Any disruption in this flow or lack of bodily fluids is considered to be unhealthy and contributes to sickness. Being thin is associated with bad health, and is a factor which affects social relationships. According to Elis J. Sobo, "A slim person, especially a slim woman, is called a mauger - meagre and powerless - as if not alive at all, and like a mummy or an empty husk, far beyond that powerfully dangerous state of decay. A thin, dry body reveals a person's non-nurturant nature and his or her lack of social commitment" (p. 262).

== Cultural Beliefs ==
Being plump is associated with good social relationships, and thin person (mauger) is associated with bad social relationships. With this, unkindness and infertility are associated with a thin person. Food practices in the kitchen, as mentioned before, can give away a person's personality by use of food. For example, ones who do not use salt in their cooking are considered to be mean, as salt is associated with plumpness, meaning good health and good social relationships with others. Another example would be the purchase of store-bought foods.

== See also ==
- Jamaican culture
