= Alastair Macdonald (surveyor) =

Alastair Macdonald MBE
- Born: 1932 (age 93–94); United Kingdom
- Known for: Deputy Director of the Directorate of Overseas Surveys c. 1971-1982; Director of Surveys and Production at Ordnance Survey 1982-1992

Alastair Macdonald MBE (born 1932) is a British retired land surveyor and author.

== Achievements ==
Macdonald decided to become a surveyor at the age of nine.

Macdonald took part in two Spitsbergen expeditions while at Cambridge University.

Macdonald joined the Directorate of Colonial Surveys in 1955, serving in field parties in Kenya, Southern Cameroons, Uganda, the Bahamas, Sarawak, Nyasaland, Bechuanaland and Zambia. In 1969 he was seconded to the government of Malawi.

From 1971 he served with the Ministry of Defence before becoming deputy director of the Directorate of Overseas Surveys.

In 1982 he moved to the Ordnance Survey where he was Director of Surveys and Production until his retirement in 1992.

In 2002 he spoke at the International Court of Justice in a case concerning the maritime boundary between Cameroon and Nigeria.

In 2009 he was awarded an MBE for services to the resolution of boundary disputes in Africa and to cartography more generally.

== Publications ==
- Mapping The World, A History of the Directorate of Overseas Surveys 1946-1985, Alastair Macdonald, 1996, 210 pages, HMSO, Norwich, ISBN 0-11-701590-3
