= Scipione Barbò Soncino =

Italian jurist and writer

Scipione Barbò Soncino, or Scipione Barbuo, was a 16th-century Italian jurist and writer, active in Padua. His best-known work was a set of biographies of the Dukes of Milan, Sommario delle vite de' duchi di Milano (Venice, 8vo, 1574; fol. 1584), which was illustrated with engravings by Girolamo Porro.

== Bibliography ==
- Hugh James Rose; Henry John Rose; Thomas Wright, eds. (1857). "Barbo Soncino". A New General Biographical Dictionary. Vol. 3. T. Fellowes. p. 152.
- Joseph Thomas, ed. (1908). "Barbuo". Universal Pronouncing Dictionary of Biography and Mythology. Vol. 1. Lippincott. p. 281.
