= Fort George, Jamaica =

Fort George
- Port Antonio, Portland, Jamaica

Site information
- Owner: Government of Jamaica
- Open to the public: Yes

Location
- Coordinates: 18.2333°N 76.7833°W

Site history
- Built: September 1729
- Built by: Christian Lilly
- In use: No
- Materials: Granite

Fort George is a fortress situated on the Titchfield Peninsula in the town of Port Antonio, in the parish of Portland, Jamaica. The proposal for a fort in Port Antonio was first discussed in 1728, when a committee of the House of Assembly met to consider measures to be taken in the face of a possible Spanish invasion. In 1729, Christian Lilly was assigned the task of building a fort which, after being built, became known as Fort George in honour of King George I of Great Britain. Lilly had built some of the walls at the Royal Citadel, Plymouth, and the bastion at Fort George was designed as a smaller version of the Citadel.

Fort George’s construction served a dual purpose, first as a source of defence against foreign invasion and, second, to deal with the menace of the maroons in the area. The area between Fort George and Fort Haldane in nearby Port Maria had a very large population of freedom fighters in the mid-eighteenth century. One of the most notable was Tacky, who led an insurgency, known as Tacky's rebellion against the British which lasted over five months.

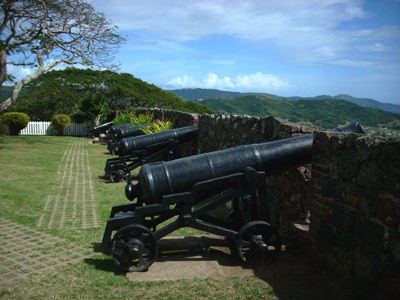
Cannons at Fort George

Fort George was built to hold 22 guns including 8 large cannons, and has walls ten feet thick. The fort was used during World War I as a training base and supply depot for the British Navy. The barracks of the fort now house classrooms for the Titchfield High School. Much of the fort has been lost over the almost 300 years since its original construction, and all that remains are the Munitions Building, the defence walls and a line of cannons.
