= Dwight Whylie =

Dwight Emerson Gregory Whylie (June 7, 1936 in Kingston, Jamaica - September 15, 2002 in Barbados) was a broadcaster and radio announcer.

Dwight Whylie

== Career ==
In 1961, Whylie was the first black radio announcer hired by the British Broadcasting Corporation. In 1973, he became the general manager of Jamaica Broadcasting Corporation, where he remained until 1976.

In 1977, he joined the Canadian Broadcasting Corporation, where he remained until 1997.

== Family ==
He was the brother of noted Jamaican musician Marjorie Whylie.
