= Garth Fagan =

Jamaican choreographer (born 1940)

Garth Fagan CD
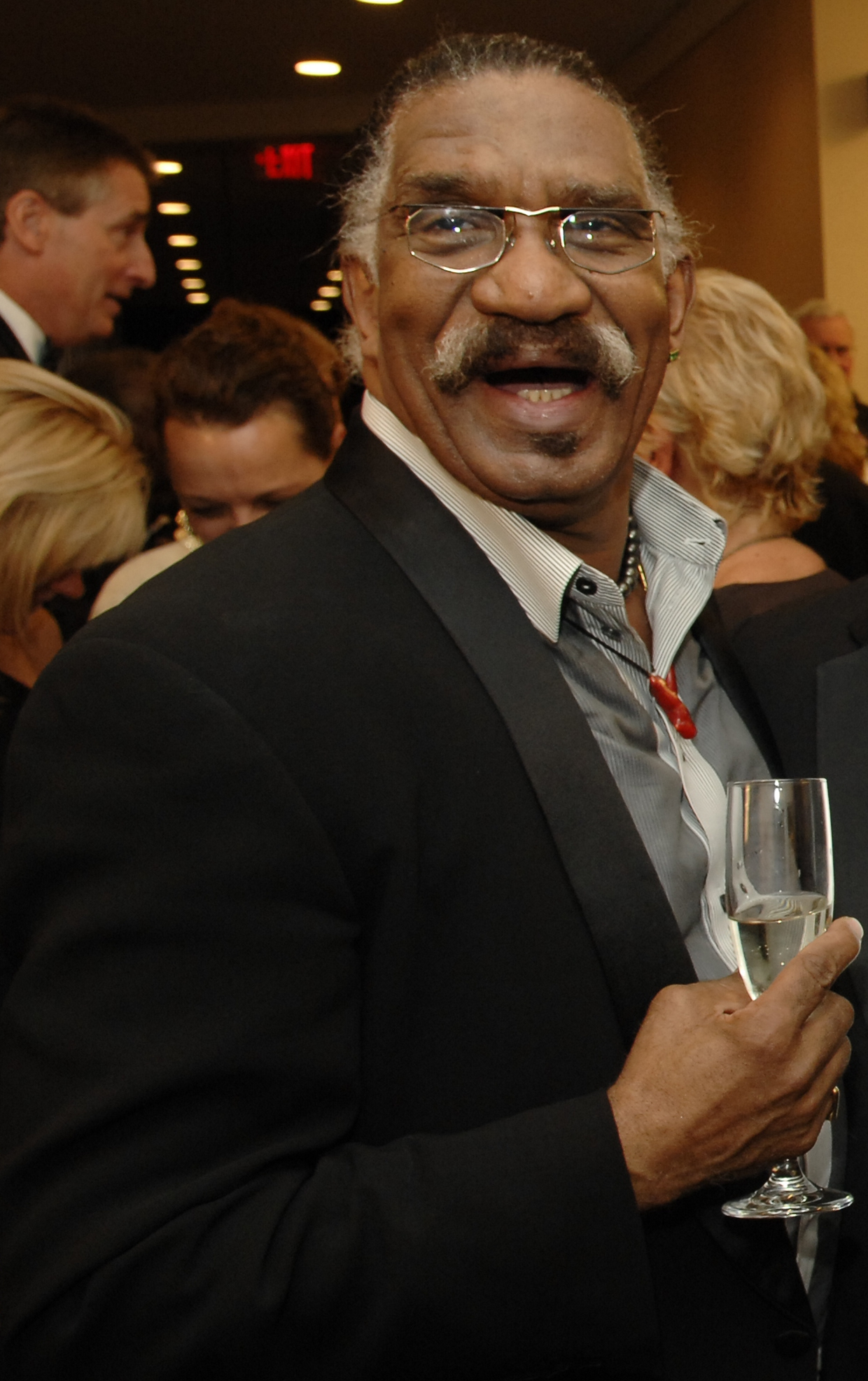
- Born: Gawain Garth Fagan; 3 May 1940 (age 86); Kingston, Jamaica
- Occupations: Theatre director, dancer, choreographer
- Years active: 1950s–present
- Awards: Drama Desk Award for Outstanding Choreography 2000 The Lion King; Laurence Olivier Award for Best Theatre Choreographer 2000 The Lion King
- Website: www.garthfagan-dance.org

Gawain Garth Fagan CD (born 3 May 1940) is a Jamaican choreographer of modern dance. He is the founder and artistic director of Garth Fagan Dance, a modern dance company based in Rochester, New York.

== Biography ==
=== Early years ===
Fagan was born in Kingston, Jamaica to Oxford educated S.W. Fagan, former Chief Education Officer of Jamaica, and Louise I. Walker. It was a gymnastics class that initially drew his attention to dance early on. While attending Excelsior High school, he studied with Ivy Baxter at the Jamaica National Dance Company and performed at the inauguration of Cuban President Fidel Castro in 1959. Fagan was educated at Wayne State University in Detroit, Michigan where he earned a Bachelor of Arts degree with sights on becoming a psychologist.

=== Career ===
Fagan worked at several dance companies in Detroit, and moved to Rochester New York in 1970, and there established his dance company originally named the "Bottom of the Bucket BUT ... Dance Theatre" in 1970. He was a Professor, at State University of New York at Brockport starting in 1970. Fagan choreographed for the Dance Theatre of Harlem, the Alvin Ailey American Dance Theater, and the Limón Dance Company in the 1970s. He has studied the works of Isadora Duncan, Martha Graham, Pearl Primus, Alvin Ailey, José Limón, and Katherine Dunham. He is also influenced by Caribbean and West African dances.

Fagan's choreography incorporates elements of modern dance, ballet, Afro-Caribbean dance, and social dance. Many of his works are autobiographical or include themes of personal relevance. His untitled 1977 work chronicles the dissolution of his marriage, showing a couple beginning a relationship with affection and passion but eventually drifting apart due to inevitable obstacles. Griot New York, which premiered in 1991 at the Brooklyn Academy of Music, is about the experiences of the underprivileged living in New York City. The piece juxtaposes linear balletic movement with sharp angular gestures, twitching, and erotic partnering to represent the diversity and contrast found in big cities as well as conflict in his own life. In Moth Dreams, choreographed in 1992, Fagan celebrates his childhood, adolescence, and relationship with his mother.

=== Personal life ===
Fagan resides in Rochester, New York, is now divorced, and has two children.

== Stage productions ==
- From Before (1978)
- Oatka Trail (1979)
- Prelude (1981, revised 1983)
- Touring Jubilee 1924 (Professional) (1982)
- Sonata and the Afternoon (1983)
- Never Top 40 (Jukebox) (1985)
- Passion Distanced (1987)
- Time After Before Place (1988)
- Until By & If (1990)
- Griot New York (1991)
- Moth Dreams (1992)
- Draft of Shadows (1993)
- Prelude (1993)
- Postcards: Pressures and Possibilities (1994)
- Earth Eagle First Circle (1995)
- Mix 25 (1996)
- Nkanyit (1997)
- The Lion King (1997)
- Two Pieces of One: Green (1998)
- Woza (1999)
- Trips and Trysts (2000)
- Music of the Line/Words in the Shape (2001)
- Translation Transition (2002)
- DANCECOLLAGEFORROMIE (2003)
- ----ING (2004)
- Life: Dark/Light (2005)
- Senku (2006)
- Edge/Joy (2007)
- Phone Tag Thanks and Things (2009)
- The North Star (2018)
- coVid Virtue Victory (2022)

== Honours and awards ==
Fagan is a Distinguished University Professor at the State University of New York at Brockport. He has a Bachelor of Arts from Wayne State University, and earned a Doctor of Fine Arts from the University of Rochester in 1986, and holds honoris causa Doctors degrees from Juilliard School, Hobart College, William Smith College, and Nazareth College.

Fagan received a Guggenheim Fellowship in 1998, and a three-year Choreography Fellowship from the National Endowment for the Arts. He was made Commander in the Order of Distinction of Jamaica in August 2001, and was presented the Prime Minister's Award by Jamaican Prime Minister P. J. Patterson .

In 2005 he received the Artist of the Year Award from the Arts & Cultural Council for Greater Rochester.

In 2012, Fagan was named one of America's Irreplaceable Dance Treasures by the Dance Heritage Coalition.

In 2021, Fagan was awarded the Eastman Luminary Award from the Eastman School of Music for his achievements in modern Dance

Awards

- 1998 Drama Desk Award for Outstanding Choreography – The Lion King
- 1998 Outer Critics Circle Award for Best Choreography – The Lion King
- 1998 Tony Award for Best Choreography – The Lion King
- 2000 Laurence Olivier Award for Best Theatre Choreographer – The Lion King
- 2001 Samuel H. Scripps American Dance Festival Award – Lifetime Achievement
- 2021 Eastman Luminary Award - Lifetime Achievement
