= Christian Lilly =

German military engineer

- Died: 1738
- Occupation: Military engineer

Christian Lilly (died 1738) was a German military engineer.

== Biography ==
Lilly commenced his military career in the service of the Dukes of Zelle and Hanover in 1685, and was under the command of Prince Frederick Augustus and of Lieutenant-general Chauvet. He served several campaigns against the Turks in Hungary, and was present at the battle of Grau and the sieges of Neuhausel, Caschaw, Polack, and Buda (1683–6). In 1688 he entered the service of William III, by whom he was naturalised as an Englishman. He served in Scotland in 1689, and in Ireland during the greater part of the war. He was posted to King William's Dutch train of artillery, and served first under Count Solmes at the battle of the Boyne on 1 July 1690, and afterwards under General Ginkell at the first siege of Athlone and the first siege of Limerick, raised on 27 August. On 3 September 1690 he was appointed ensign in Lieutenant-general Douglas's regiment, and quartermaster-general to the grand detachment of the army commanded by that officer. He again served under Ginkell at Ballymore in June 1691, was director of the approaches in the second siege of Athlone during the same month, took part in the battle of Aughrim on 11 July, was engineer at the short siege of Galway which followed, and during August and September at the second siege of Limerick, which ended the war.

On 1 May 1692 Lilly was appointed engineer of the office of ordnance, and was sent with the train of artillery upon an expedition under the Duke of Leinster, to make a descent upon the French coast, but this proving unsuccessful, a descent was made upon Flanders instead. By royal warrant of 4 August 1692 he was appointed engineer at 10s. a day to accompany a train of brass ordnance and mortars to the West Indies. In 1693 he was sent with the expedition under Sir Francis Wheler to Barbados, Martinique, the Leeward Islands, New England, and Newfoundland, where besides his post of engineer he had chief command of the artillery train, and was captain of a company of foot. On his return home he was appointed on 30 October 1693 captain in Colonel Lillingston's regiment of foot, and was sent into garrison at Plymouth.

On 12 October 1694 the Earl of Romney, master-general of the ordnance, appointed him engineer and to command the train of artillery for the West Indies. He went out with Colonel Lillingston in 1695, and served at the sieges of Cape François and Port à Paix in Hispaniola, which were taken from the French, and he was afterwards stationed at Jamaica. The town of Kingston, Jamaica, was built on plans prepared by Lilly after the old town of Port Royal had been destroyed by earthquake in 1692. On 19 May 1696 he was appointed fireworker to the artillery train, and the same year was sent to Cuba to report on the situation and strength of the Havana, after which he returned to England. On 17 November he was appointed chief engineer of Jamaica at 20s. a day. He repaired the fortifications of Port Royal, and strengthened the fortifications of other parts of the island under Sir William Beeston. In accordance with a warrant of the governor, dated 1 May 1698, Lilly proceeded with the squadron under Admiral Benbow to examine the Spanish ports on the coast of Peru. He visited Portobello, Carthagena, and the Scottish settlements, &c., and returning to England laid reports upon the capabilities of these ports for defence before the king.

When on 24 May 1698 the artillery trains employed in Flanders and at sea were dismissed and a peace train ordered to be formed, Lilly was appointed one of the six engineers at 100l. per annum from 1 May 1698. By royal warrant of 28 June 1701 the king appointed him third engineer of England, his commission to date from 1 July, with a salary of 150l. per annum.

On 14 August the same year he was again appointed chief engineer at Jamaica, and accompanied Brigadier-general William Selwyn to the West Indies. He made surveys of Port Royal and other harbours of Jamaica, and was also engaged in repairing and improving the fortifications. On 10 November 1703 Acting Governor Thomas Handasyd appointed him lieutenant-colonel of artillery in Jamaica. On 4 May 1704 the board of ordnance appointed him chief engineer in the West Indies, and instructed him to fortify the island of Barbados under the orders of General Sir Bevil Granville, the governor. On 29 January 1705 Sir Bevill appointed him colonel of artillery at Barbados. In 1707 he was sent to Antigua, Nevis, and St. Kitts, to inquire under General Park into the military condition of those islands. He sent home projects and surveys showing what he considered to be necessary for their defence. On the completion of this duty he returned to Barbados, and resumed the superintendence of the construction of defence works there. On 12 May 1709 the board of ordnance appointed him keeper of the naval ordnance stores at Barbados.

In the summer of 1711, under a warrant of the board of ordnance dated 6 March, he proceeded to Newfoundland to report on the harbours of St. John and Ferryland, and to settle matters in controversy relating to the security and fortification of those ports. His reports were transmitted for the information both of the board of ordnance and the board of trade and plantations. He returned to England in 1712, but his friends having just gone out of power, he remained unemployed, receiving only the pay of his appointment of third engineer of Great Britain.

On the accession of George I, by royal warrant of 2 March 1714–5, Lilly was continued in the post of third engineer of Great Britain, and by a warrant of the board of ordnance, dated 22 March, was appointed to examine the fortifications of Portland, Dartmouth, Plymouth, Falmouth, and the Scilly Islands; and to survey, repair, and project what might be necessary to maintain and improve the defences of those places. His reports were approved by the board of ordnance, and the form of them was so good that it was adopted for general use. He was then appointed engineer in charge of the Plymouth division, embracing the coast from Portland to the Scilly Islands. This duty he continued to discharge until 1719, when he was called to London.

From 1701 the question of the fire of bombs from mortars and howitzers had engaged Lilly's attention, and he had carried on experiments from time to time to determine a rule for the charges and elevations to be given to such ordnance, in order to secure certain definite ranges. In 1722 he obtained metal from the board of ordnance to construct a small experimental howitzer to carry out trials in a systematic manner. In the same year he petitioned for promotion in the service without success, and he attributed the neglect to his foreign origin, although he spoke English so well that he passed as a born Englishman, ‘except among his competitors for place and their patrons.’ In a fruitless petition for preferment in 1726 he described himself as the oldest engineer in the service, and mentioned that he had been present at fifteen battles and sieges in various countries.

On the accession of George II his appointment as third engineer of Great Britain was renewed by royal warrant of 23 December 1727, and his pay was increased from 150l. to 200l. per annum ‘for his further encouragement.’ This pay was independent of any pay for special service. Thus, when he was in Barbados he was drawing in addition 365l. as chief engineer, West Indies; 319l. 7s. 6d. as colonel of artillery; and 146l. as keeper of naval ordnance stores; or 980l. 7s. 6d. in all.

In November 1728, after much negotiation, Lilly went out to Jamaica as chief engineer to see after the fortifications and the proposed new settlement at Port Antonio. He arrived at Jamaica on 5 April 1729, to find that the anticipation of a Spanish invasion had led the people of Jamaica to bestir themselves in disciplining the militia and repairing the fortifications. On 4 May he accompanied Governor Hunter in H.M.S. Plymouth to Port Antonio to see what could be done for the security of the place, which was exposed to raids by the Spaniards from S. Jago in Cuba. Lilly remained at Port Antonio for nearly a year, preparing designs for the defences, and suffering much from fever and ague. He was so ill that it was reported home by the masters of some ships from Jamaica that he was dead, and he was in consequence struck off the books for salary for March quarter 1730. He continued, however, to reside in Jamaica, constructing Fort George at Port Antonio and superintending all the other works of defence and barracks in the island. Shortly after his reports and estimates for Fort George were sent in, a sharp contention arose between himself and the governor, who had himself designed a work, respecting the relative merits of their designs. This culminated in Lilly's suspension on 20 August 1733. He appears to have been soon reinstated, as he made official reports as usual to the board of ordnance. On 31 March 1734 Governor Hunter died, and was succeeded the following month by John Ayscough, who appointed Lilly to be captain of Fort Charles, ‘reposing especial trust and confidence in his experience, courage, conduct, fidelity, and skill in military affairs.’ Lilly died in 1738.

The following plans drawn by Lilly were placed in the British Museum:

- ‘The Profile or Elevation of Fort Charles at Port Royal, Jamaica.’ Drawn 1699, 1 sheet.
- ‘Drawn Plans and Sections of the Several Buildings in St. Nicholas Island,’ Plymouth, 1716, 1 sheet.
- ‘A Drawn Plan of the South Coast of Great Britain, showing the Principal Harbours, Towns, and Fortifications, extracted from several of the best and most modern Surveys, as well as the proper Observations of Colonel Christian Lilly, Engineer,’ 1718, 2 sheets.
