= Tomaso Porcacchi Castilione =

- Born: 1530; Castiglion Fiorentino, Val di Chiana
- Died: 1576 (aged 45–46); Udine
- Known for: Writer, cartographer
- Spouse: The poet Bianca d'Este

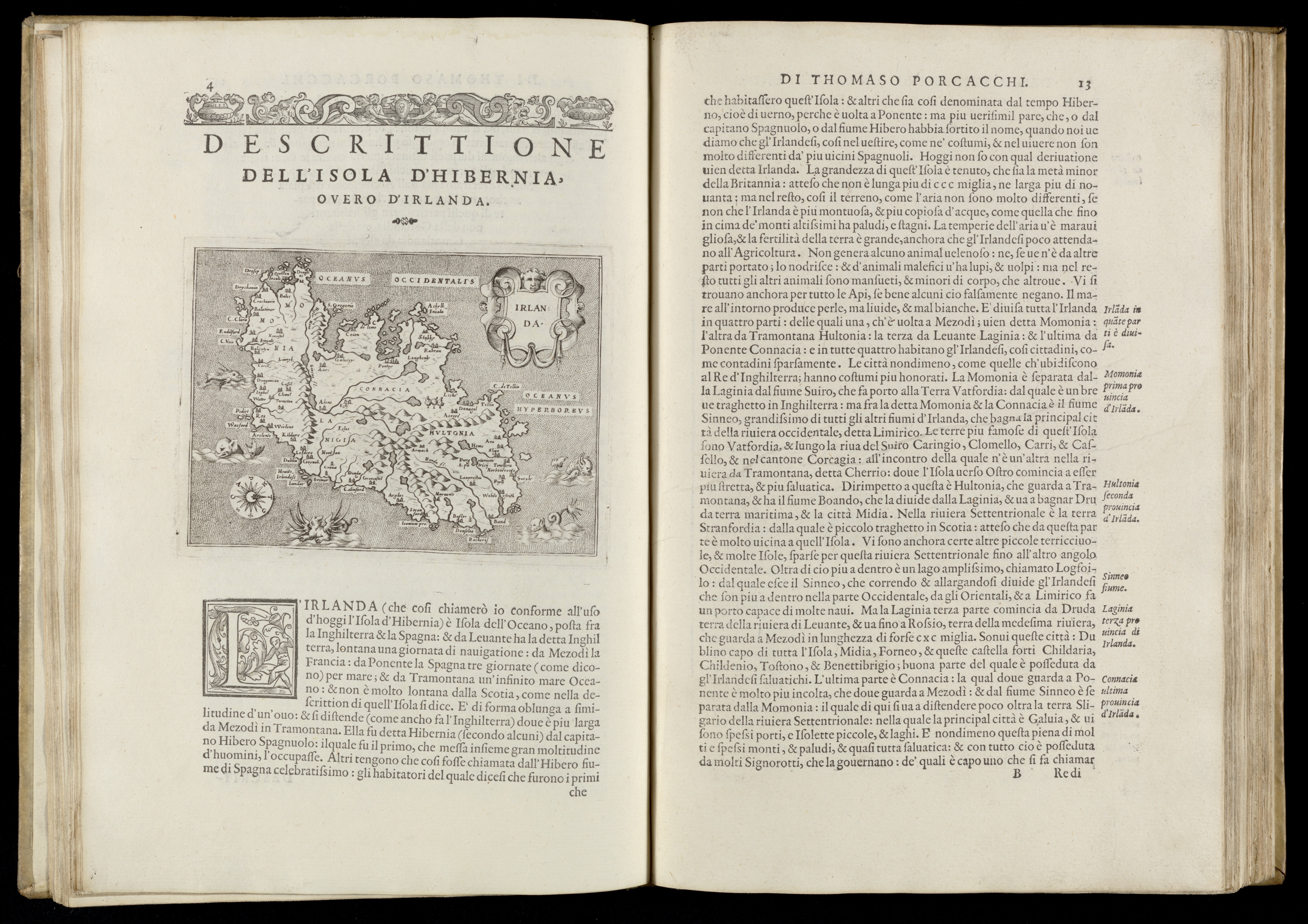
Description of Ireland from Tomaso Porcacchi Castilione's 'L'Isole piu Famose del Mondo', Venice 1576. Chester Beatty Library

Tomaso Porcacchi Castilione (1530–1576) was an author and cartographer.

== Works ==
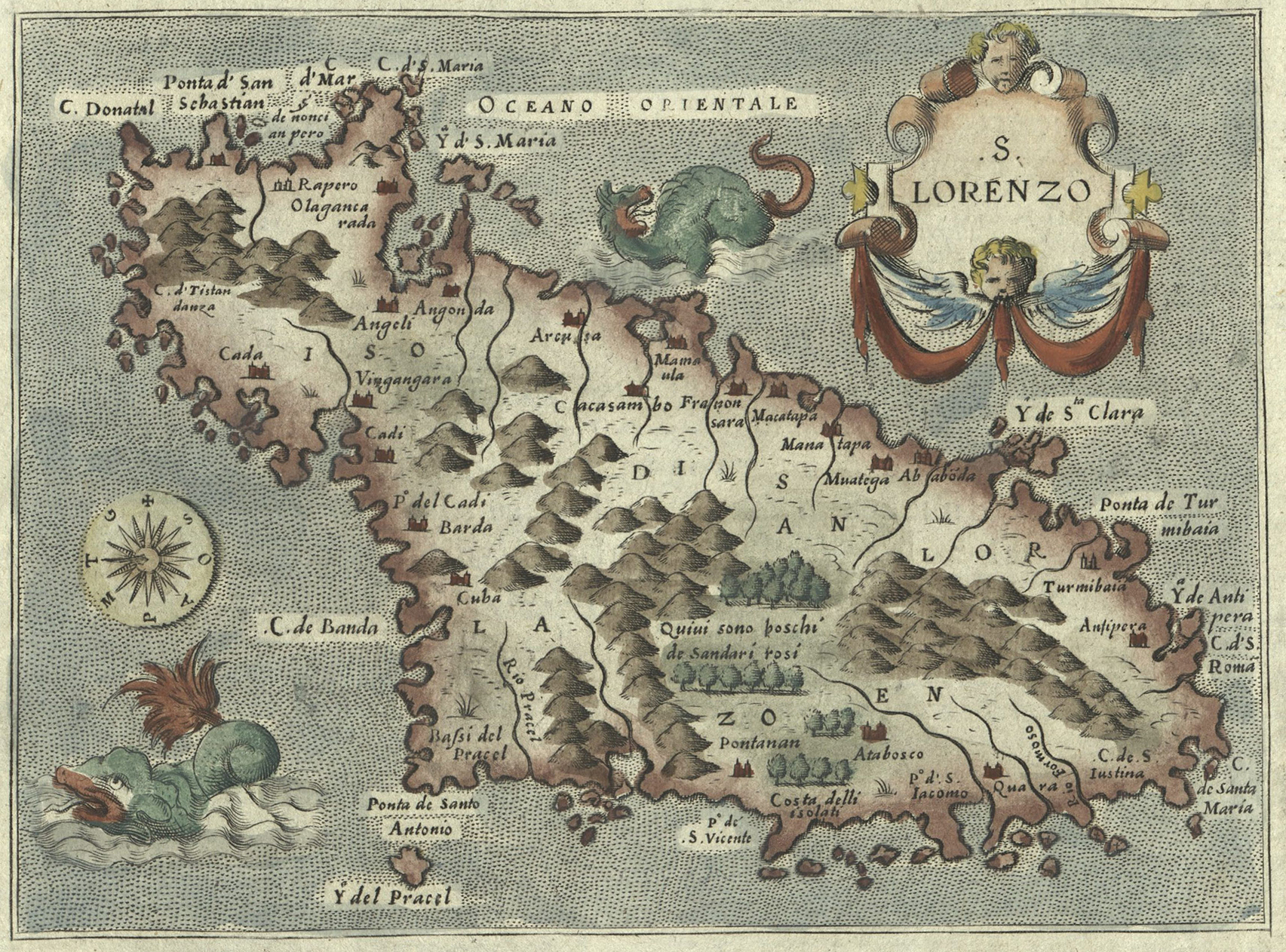
S. Lorenzo [Madagascar], L'Isole pu Famose del Mondo, 1572

- Lettere di XIII huomini illustri, allequali oltra tutte l'altre fin qua stampate, di nuouo ne sono state aggiunte molte Da Thomaso Porcacchi, in Vinetia presso Giorgio de' Cavalli, 1565.
- Paralleli o essempi simili di Thomaso Porcacchi cauati da gl'historici, accioché si vegga, come in ogni tempo le cose del mondo hanno riscontro, o fra loro, o con quelle de' tempi antichi. È questa, secondo l'ordine da lui posto, la seconda gioia, congiunta all'anella della sua collana historica, In Vinegia : appresso Gabriel Giolito de' Ferrari, 1567.
- La nobiltà della città di Como (in Italian). Venezia: Gabriele Giolito de Ferrari. 1568.
- Funerali antichi di diuersi popoli, et nationi; forma, ordine, et pompa di sepolture, di essequie, di consecrationi antiche at d'altro, descritti in dialogo da Thomaso Porcacchi da Castiglione Arretino. Con le figure in rame di Girolamo Porro Padouano, In Venetia, appresso Simon Galignani de Karera, 1574.
- L'isole più famose del mondo descritte da Thomaso Porcacchi da Castiglione arretino e intagliate da Girolamo Porro padovano con l'aggiunta di molte isole. All'Ill.ss S. conte Georgio Trivultio Dottore, cavaliere, conte di Melzo, regio e ducal sanatore. Con privilegio, In Venetia : appresso Simon Galignani e Girolamo Porro, 1576.
