= National Dance Theatre Company of Jamaica =

The National Dance Theatre Company of Jamaica (NDTC) is Jamaica's leading dance theatre company.

== Foundation ==
The company was founded in 1962 by Rex Nettleford and Eddy Thomas with fifteen dancers, with Nettleford acting as its artistic director and principal choreographer, and Martha Graham as patron. Drawing on African Caribbean folk traditions and cultural themes as well as modern dance, the company has promoted Caribbean culture through its performances. On its foundation, the stated aim was "projecting the movement patterns and customs of the island to people locally and abroad", and they stated that they would "maintain constant research and documentation of our folk legends and customs to be used as thematic material for new dances". The company has been regarded as part of the People's National Party's efforts to 'decolonize' Jamaica of European influence.

== History ==
The company toured Australia in 1976 with financial assistance from the Australian government, and has performed in the United States, Canada, the United Kingdom, Finland, Germany, and through the Caribbean and Latin America.

Other dancers and choreographers that have been part of the company include Jackie Guy MBE, Joyce Campbell, Noelle Chutkan, and Clive Thompson.

The company was awarded the Maurice Bishop Award in 1986.

== Present status ==
Based at the Little Theatre on Tom Redcam Drive in Kingston, the company performs an annual season in Jamaica. The current artistic director is Marlon Simms, who is a long standing member of the company.
