= Eddy Thomas =

Jamaican dancer, choreographer (c. 1932–2014)

Eddy Thomas (c. 1932 – 10 April 2014) was a Jamaican dancer, choreographer and dance instructor. With Rex Nettleford he co-founded the National Dance Theatre Company of Jamaica (NDTC). Before establishing the NDTC, Thomas was a member of the Martha Graham Dance Company in New York City.

== Background ==
In 1958, he established the Eddy Thomas Workshop, with branches in Kingston and Mandeville, which was a foremost training ground for the development of Jamaican artists, and in 1959, Thomas won the Jamaican government Arts Council Award and went to study in New York, and at the Connecticut College Dance Festival in New London with Martha Graham and such others such as Merce Cunningham and José Limón.

In 1962, Thomas and Rex Nettleford co-founded the National Dance Theatre Company of Jamaica (NDTC). Works that Thomas choreographed works included: Legend of Lovers' Leap, A Time to Rejoice, Foot Notes in Jazz, Afro West Indian Suite, Games of Arms, Liza, And It Came To Pass, Concert Suite, Country Wedding, Parade Kingston 13, Jamaican Promenade and Omegan Procession. Also a costume designer, he was responsible for most of the costume designs for the NDTC's repertoire.

Thomas died at his home in Montego Bay, Jamaica, on 10 April 2014, at the age of 82.
