= Rex Nettleford =

Jamaican academic and choreographer (1933–2010)

The Honourable Rex Nettleford OM OCC FIJ
- Born: Ralston Milton Nettleford; 3 February 1933; Falmouth, Colony of Jamaica, British Empire
- Died: 2 February 2010 (aged 76); Washington, D.C., U.S.
- Education: University of the West Indies; Oriel College, Oxford
- Occupations: Academic; social critic; choreographer
- Notable work: Mirror, Mirror: Identity, Race and Protest in Jamaica (1970)
- Awards: Order of Merit; Gold Musgrave Medal

Ralston Milton "Rex" Nettleford OM OCC FIJ (3 February 1933 – 2 February 2010) was a Jamaican scholar, social critic, choreographer, and Vice-Chancellor Emeritus of the University of the West Indies (UWI), the leading research university in the Commonwealth Caribbean.

== Biography ==
Rex Nettleford was born on February 3, 1933 in Falmouth, Jamaica, Nettleford attended Unity Primary School in Bunkers Hill, Trelawny, and graduated from Cornwall College in Montego Bay, before going to the University of the West Indies (UWI) to obtain an honours degree in history. As a child, he sang and recited in school concerts, sang in the church choir, danced, and began working as a choreographer at the age of 11 with the Worm Chambers Variety Troupe, which helped to fund his studies. At Cornwall College, he acted in productions of the college's drama club, and was published as a poet. He was a recipient of the 1957 Rhodes Scholarship to Oriel College, Oxford, where he received a postgraduate degree in Politics, returning to Jamaica in the early 1960s to take up a position at UWI.

At UWI, he first gained recognition as a co-author (with M. G. Smith and Roy Augier) of a groundbreaking study of the Rastafari movement in 1961. In 1962, Nettleford and Eddy Thomas co-founded the National Dance Theatre Company of Jamaica, an ensemble which under his direction did much to incorporate traditional Jamaican music and dance into a formal balletic repertoire.

For more than twenty years, Nettleford was also artistic director for the University Singers of UWI at Mona campus. The combination of Nettleford as artistic director and Noel Dexter as musical director with the University Singers, saw the creation of what is referred to as "choral theatre".

Beginning with the collection of essays, Mirror, Mirror, published in 1969, and his editing and compiling of the speeches and writings of Norman Manley, Manley and the New Jamaica; in 1971, Nettleford established himself as a serious public historian and social critic. In 1968, he took over direction of the School for Continuing Studies at UWI and then of the Extra-Mural Department. Rex died on February 2, 2010

In 1975, the Jamaican state recognized his cultural and scholarly achievements by awarding him the Order of Merit. He also received the Gold Musgrave Medal (1981) and 13 honorary doctorates, including one in Civil Law from Oxford University. In 1996, he became Vice-Chancellor of the UWI, and held that office until 2004, when he was succeeded by E. Clark Harris.

== Death ==
On 27 January 2010, Nettleford was admitted to the intensive-care unit of the George Washington University Hospital, Washington, D.C., after suffering a heart attack at his hotel in the city. He was unconscious and in a coma for several days. On Tuesday, 2 February 2010, he was pronounced dead at around 8:00pm EST.

Nettleford died one day before his 77th birthday. He suffered a serious brain injury while he was in cardiac arrest. He was in Washington for a meeting with the United Nations to discuss the state of racial discrimination around the world, and had been expected to meet in New York with his former employer, University of the West Indies, for a fundraising event. Nettleford was an important individual to the extramural studies department at University of the West Indies and was also an advisor to political leaders in the Caribbean.

== Legacy ==
In 2004, the Rhodes Trust established the Rex Nettleford Prize in cultural studies.

The Rex Nettleford Foundation was established after his death. Nettleford's life was the subject of a trilogy of films by Lennie Little-White, commissioned by the foundation.

== Select bibliography ==
- Roots and Rhythms: the Story of the Jamaican National Dance Theatre (1969), London: Deutsch.
- Mirror, Mirror: Identity, Race and Protest in Jamaica (1970), Kingston: Sangster and Collins.
- African Connexion: Parallels; Historical Continuity; Panafricanism; African in the World, University of the West Indies (1972).
