= Society for Advancement of Chicanos and Native Americans in Science =

- Abbreviation: SACNAS
- Formation: 1973; 53 years ago
- Type: Non-profit
- Headquarters: Santa Cruz, CA
- Fields: STEM
- President: Charla Lambert (2023–2024)
- Award: Presidential Award for Excellence in Science, Mathematics, and Engineering Mentoring (2004)
- Website: sacnas.org

The Society for Advancement of Chicanos and Native Americans in Science (SACNAS) is a nonprofit organization founded in 1973. It is the largest multicultural STEM diversity organization in the United States, with a mission to advance the success of Chicano, Hispanic, and Native American students in obtaining advanced degrees, careers, leadership positions, and equality in the STEM field. It serves a community of over 20,000 members and has 118 student and professional chapters on college campuses across the United States and its territories.

== Background and history ==
SACNAS started its programs in junior and high schools, extending support through undergraduate and graduate initiatives, with the primary aim of mentoring students from minority backgrounds. The society operates without discrimination against any group, providing assistance to students of various ethnicities, including African Americans, Asian Americans, and white students, as well as individuals in the social sciences. It is committed to expanding graduate and post-graduate funding opportunities for Chicanos/Hispanics and Native Americans, which enhances their representation in STEM fields.

Between 2005 and 2010, SACNAS observed a 40% increase in participation for its annual conferences and expanded from 32 to 50 chapters on college campuses nationwide. The society's revenue also rose significantly, growing from $2.3 million to $3.8 million between 2007 and 2010.

In April 2011, SACNAS released a strategic plan titled "Vision 2020", detailing its objectives for the 2010s which involve expanding membership, providing increased support for students and professionals, engaging in policy and advocacy to advance Chicanos/Hispanics and Native Americans in STEM fields, fostering collaborations with other organizations and companies for scholarships and internships, and enhancing organizational capacity and technology.

In 2013, the organization was recognized for using social media and online networking to diversify STEM fields and mitigate the geographic isolation faced by many minority groups striving to succeed in science.

== Programs ==
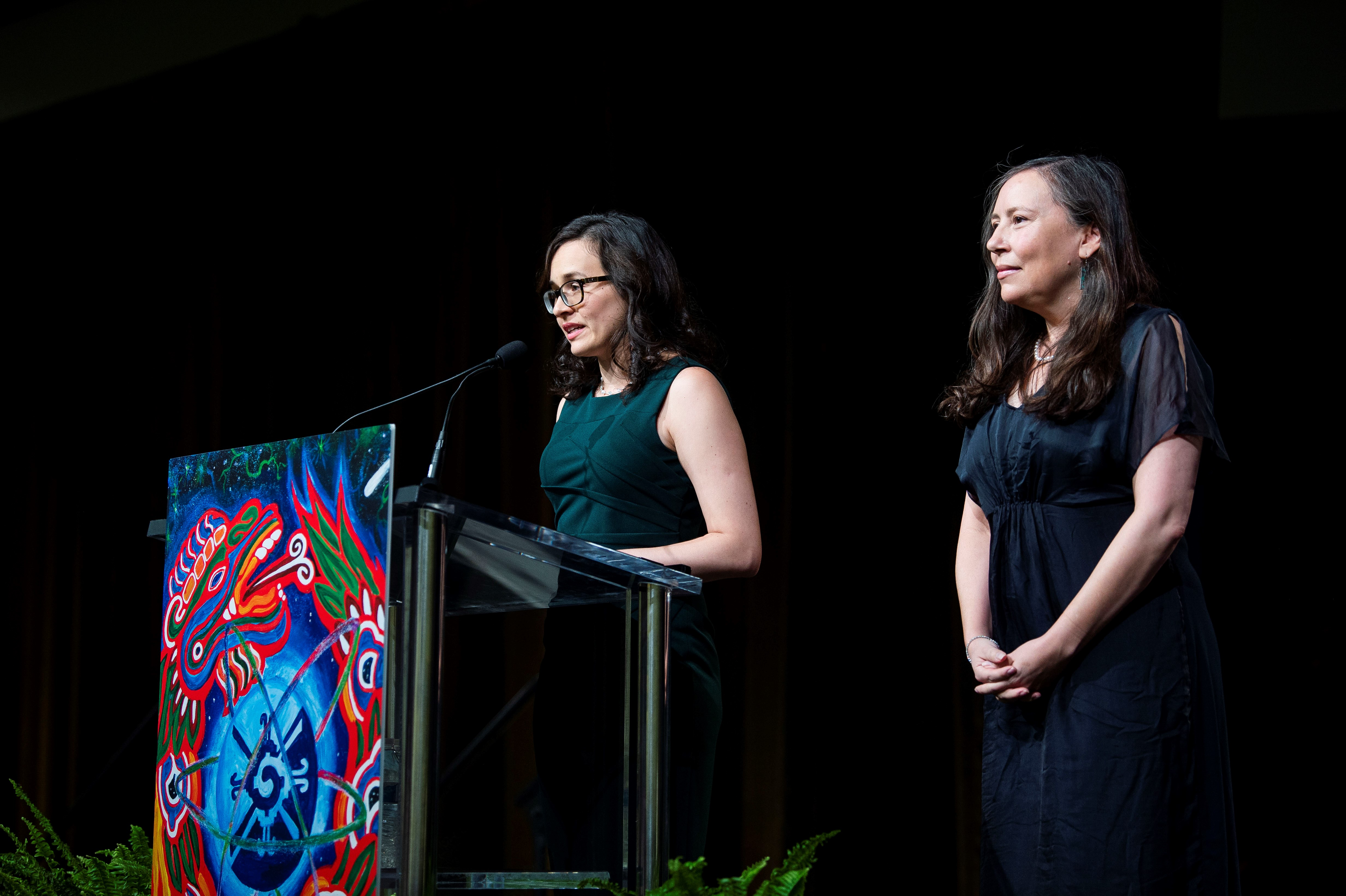
Speakers at the 2018 National Diversity in STEM Conference

SACNAS organizes various programs aimed at enhancing Chicano/Hispanic and Native American participation and success in science. As part of its strategy to support these students and professionals, SACNAS hosts the National Diversity in STEM Conference, an annual event featuring workshops, scientific presentations (including posters and oral presentations), motivational speakers, and networking opportunities. SACNAS also offers scholarships covering lodging and travel expenses for the conference. Between 2005 and 2010, its student researcher participation increased from 543 to 883 individuals.

SACNAS also organizes two leadership conferences annually with the objective of nurturing leadership skills and preparing minority groups for leadership roles in STEM fields at various levels. The organization boasts over 115 professional and student chapters nationwide, which offers local community and support, as well as opportunities in science, leadership, and personal development for its members. These chapters are encouraged to host two SACNAS Regional Meetings each spring, which provide an opportunity for neighboring chapters, members, high schools, and professionals to stay informed about upcoming events and opportunities. In addition, they serve as a platform for chapters to network and for students to share their research within a scientific community.

Within the broader SACNAS community, the society has established an online Native American community, which offers learning, teaching, networking, and mentoring resources for Native American students.

== Governance ==
=== Board of directors ===
The SACNAS board of directors provides governance and leadership, and supports fundraising efforts of the organization. The board is composed of ten members in total: four officers, seven members at large, two student members, and one board liaison. The board is represented by people with a broad spectrum of backgrounds and careers in STEM. For example, former President (2016–2018) Lino Gonzalez is a senior scientist at 23andMe; current President (and former Secretary) Sonia Zárate is the Program Officer for Undergraduate and Graduate Science Education at Howard Hughes Medical Institute; while Treasurer Patricia Silveyra and Secretary Corey Garza are both faculty at universities. Between 2001 and 2002, Maria Elena Zavala served as the Society's first Chicana president.

==== Past presidents ====
- 1973 – 1974: Alonzo Atencio
- 1975 – 1976: Eugene Cota Robles
- 1977 – 1979: Miguel Rios
- 1980 – 1986: Jose V. Martinez
- 1986 – 1990: Frank Talamantes
- 1991 – 1994: George Castro
- 1995 – 1996: William Velez
- 1997 – 1998: John Alderete
- 1999 – 2000: David Burgess
- 2001 – 2002: Maria Elena Zavala
- 2003 – 2004: Luis Haro
- 2005 – 2006: Marigold Linton
- 2007 – 2008: Aaron Velasco
- 2009 – 2010: J.D. Garcia
- 2011 – 2012: Ernest Marquez
- 2013 – 2014: Margaret Werner-Washburne
- 2015 – 2016: Gabriel Montaño
- 2017 – 2018: Lino Gonzalez
- 2019 – 2020: Sonia I. Zárate
- 2021 – 2022: Pamela Padilla
- 2023 – 2024: Charla Lambert
- 2025 – 2026: Healani Chang

== Honors and awards ==
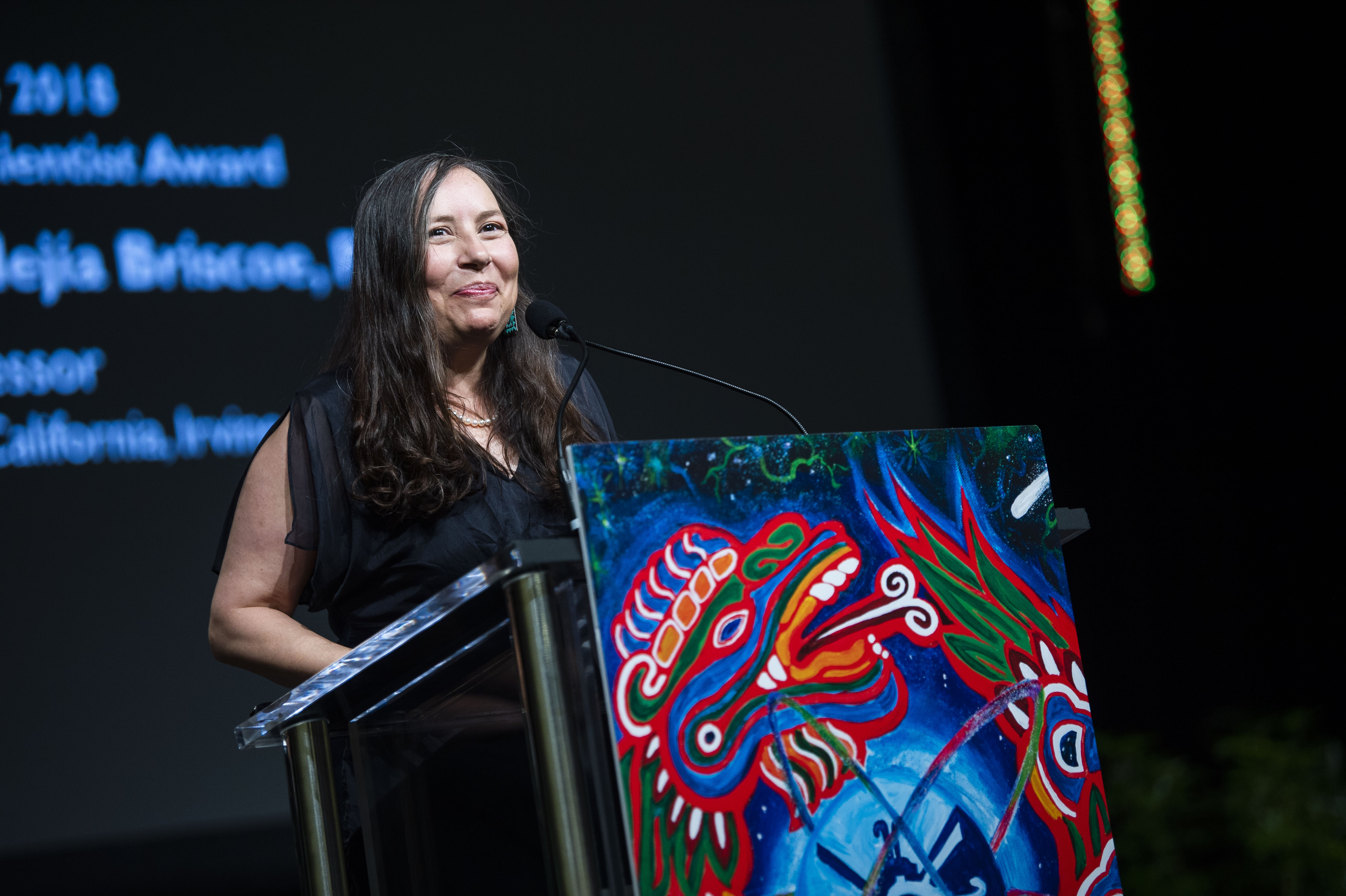
SACNAS Distinguished Scientist Dr. Adriana Briscoe at the 2018 SACNAS National Conference

=== Awards received ===
In 2001, SACNAS received the Public Service Award from the National Science Board, and in 2004 received the Presidential Award for Excellence in Science, Mathematics, and Engineering Mentoring (PAESMEM). Marigold Linton, one of the founding members and past presidents, also received the PAESMEM award individually in 2011.

=== Awards presented ===
SACNAS presents various awards at the National Diversity in STEM annual meeting. These include the Distinguished Scientist Award and the Distinguished Mentor Award. Past recipients of the Distinguished Scientist Award include: Fred Begay, Richard A. Tapia, Carlos Castillo-Chavez, Donna Nelson, Eloy Rodriguez, Jorge Gardea-Torresdey, Enrique Lavernia, Margaret Werner-Washburne, Elma Gonzalez, Miguel José Yacamán, Adriana Briscoe, Joseph L. Bull, and Renato Aguilera. SACNAS chapters can also receive awards for excellence.

==== Distinguished Scientist Awardees ====
- 1997 – Frank Talamantes
- 1997 – Luis Villarreal
- 1998 – Francisco J. Ayala
- 1999 – Fred Begay
- 2000 – Richard Tapia
- 2001 – Carlos Castillo-Chavez
- 2002 – Arthur Gutierrez-Hartmann
- 2003 – John Alderete
- 2004 – Elma Gonzalez
- 2005 – Margaret Werner-Washburne
- 2006 – Donna Nelson
- 2007 – Eloy Rodriguez
- 2008 – Juan Meza
- 2009 – Jorge Gardea-Torresdey
- 2010 – Ramon Lopez
- 2011 – Enrique Lavernia
- 2012 – Miguel José Yacamán
- 2013 – Miguel A. Mora
- 2014 – José A. López
- 2015 – Carlos Rios-Velazquez
- 2016 – Steven Greenbaum
- 2017 – Robert S. Fuller
- 2018 – Adriana Darielle Mejía Briscoe
- 2019 – Renato Aguilera
- 2020 – Javier Rojo
- 2021 – Maria C. Tamargo
- 2022 – Otakuye Conroy-Ben
- 2023 – Santiago Schnell
- 2024 – Joseph Bull
- 2025 – Jani Ingram

==== Distinguished Mentor Awardees ====
- 2016 – Sarina Ergas
- 2017 – Cynthia Wyels
- 2018 – Ofelia Olivero
- 2019 – Robert E. Megginson
- 2020 – Lorenza Levy
- 2021 – Enrico Ramirez-Ruiz
- 2022 – Arnaldo Diaz Vazquez
- 2023 – Paola López-Duarte
- 2024 – Eugene Mananga
- 2025 – Judith Simcox

== See also ==
- American Indian Science and Engineering Society
