= Edward A. Bouchet Award =

Annual prize presented by the American Physical Society

The Edward A. Bouchet Award is an annual prize presented by the American Physical Society (APS) to recognize distinguished physicists from underrepresented communities who have made significant contributions to research in the field of physics and for the advancement of minority scientists. The award provides a stipend of $5,000 and travel expenses for attending an APS meeting and visiting up to three institutions for talks and classroom visits.

The prize has been awarded since 1994 and is named after Edward A. Bouchet, the first African American to earn a doctorate degree from Yale University. He earned a Ph.D. in physics from Yale University in 1876.

== Recipients ==
- 2026: Laura A. Lopez
- 2025: Geraldine L. Cochran
- 2024: Alvine Kamaha
- 2023: Carlos R. Ordóñez
- 2022: Paul L. J. Guèye
- 2021: Chanda Prescod-Weinstein
- 2020: Nadya Mason
- 2019: Carlos O. Lousto
- 2018: Miguel José Yacamán
- 2017: Enrico J. Ramirez-Ruiz
- 2016: Pablo Laguna
- 2015: Jorge Lopez
- 2014: Luz Martinez-Miranda
- 2013: Stephon Alexander
- 2012: Ramon Lopez
- 2011: Peter Delfyett
- 2010: Herman B. White
- 2009: Gaston R. Gutierrez
- 2008: Ronald E. Mickens
- 2007: Gabriela Gonzalez
- 2006: Angel Garcia
- 2005: Godfrey Gumbs
- 2004: Juan M. Maldacena
- 2003: Homer Alfred Neal
- 2002: Oliver Keith Baker
- 2001: Jorge Pullin
- 2000: Philip W. Phillips
- 1999: Alfred Z. Msezane
- 1998: Jose D. Garcia Jr.
- 1997: Larry Donnie Gladney
- 1996: Anthony Michael Johnson
- 1995: Joseph Johnson III
- 1994: Sylvester James Gates

== See also ==
- List of physics awards
