= Ofelia Olivero =

Argentine-American biologist

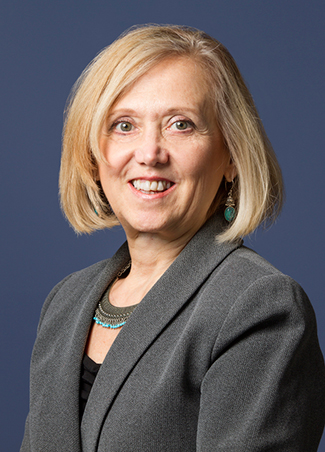
- Education: National University of La Plata
- Scientific career
- Fields: HIV/AIDS, biomedical research
- Workplaces: National Cancer Institute

Ofelia Ana Olivero is an Argentine-American biologist specialized in HIV/AIDS and biomedical research. She pioneered the discovery of nucleoside analogs induced centrosomal amplification and aneuploidy while working as a senior staff scientist at the National Cancer Institute (NCI). In 2016, she became chief of the NCI diversity intramural workforce branch.

== Education ==
Ofelia A. Olivero obtained her Ph.D. in cytogenetics from National University of La Plata.

== Career and research ==
In 1987, Olivero joined the National Cancer Institute (NCI) as a postdoctoral researcher. With her colleagues, she showed for the first time that the nucleoside analog used in the earliest AIDS therapy by pregnant women to prevent the vertical transmission of HIV from the mother to the fetus was a transplacental carcinogen in mice. Since then the insert of the drug AZT contained a paragraph indicating the danger to the unborn baby. She pioneered the discovery of nucleoside analogs induced centrosomal amplification and aneuploidy working as a senior staff scientist in the Laboratory of Cancer Biology and Genetics at the NCI. She is the author and co-author of more than 75 scientific articles, book chapters and her book entitled, Interdisciplinary Mentoring in Science: Strategies for Success (2013). In her book, she describes what successful mentoring is, what it is not, and how these important concepts relate to scientists today.

In 2016, Olivero became chief of the diversity intramural workforce branch (IDWB) where she led efforts of NCI to increase diversity in the workforce.

Olivero has been an active member of the National Institutes of Health (NIH) SACNAS Chapter, the NIH and HHS Hispanic Employee Organization (HEO), and a long-standing member of the American Association for Cancer Research, where she participates in their minority and women in cancer research special groups. For three years, she was engaged as an active member and advisor to the NIH Hispanic Employment Committee (HEC) where she advocated for equity, diversity and inclusion and helped lead numerous activities to attract Hispanics and Latinos in science to the NIH. An advocate of equal rights, Olivero has stood up for fairness, with firm recommendations at various diversity and inclusion panels. As a member of the NIH OHR Scientific Minority Recruitment Forum (SMRF), she has supported their recruitment activities meeting and conveying the excitement of science with students from underrepresented backgrounds in conferences and special events. Olivero was an active member of the NIH Hispanic and Latino Committee (HLEC) sponsored by NIH Office of Equality Diversity and Inclusion (EDI), and an advisor at various chief officer for scientific workforce diversity (COSWD) scientific recruitment and careers subcommittees. She was involved with the NIH Hispanic Research Special Interest Group, where she helped them establish a new mentoring venue for the NIH. Additionally, Olivero is a member of the Virtual Speakers Bureau and often presents titles about women in STEM.

She has retired from her years as a cancer researcher and now has pursued her love of coaching.

== Awards and honors ==
Olivero aimed to empower and inspire young females to choose scientific careers and was selected by the United States Department of State to be part of a delegation of female scientists to visit Brazil and Colombia to favor the participation of women in science. Olivero is the recipient of the Leading Diversity Award given by the NCI Director in appreciation of efforts furthering diversity and equal employment opportunity. She has received a mentor award from AWIS in the year 2013 because of her commitment to mentoring young minority females a mentoring award from the NCI in 2016 and was recognized as a “Game Changer” from the EDI office. The SACNAS also presented Olivero with the Distinguished Mentor Award in 2018. She received the Toxicologist Mentoring Award from the Society of Toxicology for her dedication to mentoring the professional growth of researchers from diverse backgrounds and differing levels of experience in 2020.

== Selected works ==
=== Books ===
- Olivero, Ofelia A. (2013). Interdisciplinary Mentoring in Science: Strategies for Success. Academic Press. ISBN 978-0-12-391414-9.

=== Journal articles ===
- Olivero, O. A.; Yuspa, S. H.; Poirier, M. C.; Anderson, L. M.; Jones, A. B.; Wang, C.; Diwan, B. A.; Haines, D. C.; Logsdon, D.; Harbaugh, S. W.; Moskal, T. J. (November 1997). "Transplacental Effects of 3'-Azido-2',3'-Dideoxythymidine (AZT): Tumorigenicity in Mice and Genotoxicity in Mice and Monkeys". JNCI Journal of the National Cancer Institute. 89 (21): 1602–1608. doi:10.1093/jnci/89.21.1602. ISSN 0027-8874. PMID 9362158.
- Olivero, Ofelia A.; Shearer, Gene M.; Chougnet, Claire A.; Kovacs, Andrea A.S.; Landay, Alan L.; Baker, Robin; Stek, Alice M.; Khoury, Margaret M.; Proia, Laurie A.; Kessler, Harold A.; Sha, Beverly E. (May 1999). "Incorporation of zidovudine into leukocyte DNA from HIV-1-positive adults and pregnant women, and cord blood from infants exposed in utero". AIDS. 13 (8): 919–925. doi:10.1097/00002030-199905280-00007. ISSN 0269-9370. PMID 10371172.
- Poirier, Miriam C; Olivero, Ofelia A; Walker, Dale M; Walker, Vernon E (September 2004). "Perinatal genotoxicity and carcinogenicity of anti-retroviral nucleoside analog drugs". Toxicology and Applied Pharmacology. 199 (2): 151–161. Bibcode:2004ToxAP.199..151P. doi:10.1016/j.taap.2003.11.034. PMID 15313587.
- Olivero, Ofelia A. (April 2007). "Mechanisms of genotoxicity of nucleoside reverse transcriptase inhibitors". Environmental and Molecular Mutagenesis. 48 (3–4): 215–223. Bibcode:2007EnvMM..48..215O. doi:10.1002/em.20195. PMID 16395695. S2CID 45297759.
