= Laura López =

Laura López may refer to:

- Laura López (synchronized swimmer) (born 1988), Spanish synchronized swimmer
- Laura López (water polo) (born 1988), Spanish water polo player
- Laura A. Lopez, professor of astronomy
