= Alonzo Atencio =

American biochemist (1926–2010)

Alonzo C. Atencio
- Born: June 23, 1926; Ortiz, Colorado, U.S.
- Died: January 10, 2010 (aged 83); Albuquerque, New Mexico, U.S.
- Education: University of Colorado-Boulder; Northwestern University
- Organization(s): Society for the Advancement of Chicanos and Native Americans in Science
- Children: Alonzo Atencio Jr. Deborah; Luke; Michael; Patricia; Karen (step); William (step); Angela (step); Iris (step)
- Parents: Rafael Atencio (father); Celina Ortiz Atencio (mother)
- Relatives: Rafael (brother); Eloy (brother); David (brother); Margaret (sister); Polly (sister); Laura (sister)

Alonzo Cristoval Atencio (June 23, 1926 – January 10, 2010) was a professor at the University of New Mexico School of Medicine and served as Assistant Dean for Student Affairs and Director of Minority Programs. He was the founding organizer and first president of the Society for the Advancement of Chicanos and Native Americans in Science. Atencio became known as the “Godfather of minority medical education.”

== Early life and education ==
Atencio was born on June 23, 1926 in Ortiz, Colorado to Rafael and Celina Ortiz Atencio. He received his doctorate in biochemistry at University of Colorado, Boulder. His dissertation was titled “Metabolism and Distribution of Fibrinogen in Young and Older Male Rabbits” which focused on factor XIII fibrinogen. He continued his post doctoral work at Northwestern University.

== Career ==
In 1970, Atencio joined the University of New Mexico School of Medicine as Assistant Dean for Student Affairs and Director of Minority Programs. In 1971, he was awarded the Macy Foundation Grant to speak at high schools to recruit minorities to not only apply to college and medical school. In 1973, after obtaining funds from the National Institute of Health (NIH), Atencio organized Chicanos and Native Americans in academia and government agencies to meet in Albuquerque to discuss mechanisms to develop future leaders. Atencio served as president of this group which went on to name itself the Society for the Advancement of Chicanos and Native Americans in Science at the first official meeting on April 19, 1973 held in Atlantic City, New Jersey.

== Personal life ==
Atencio died on January 10, 2010, in Albuquerque, New Mexico. Atencio married Margaret Ann. He had five children, Alonzo, Deborah, Luke Atencio, Michael Atencio, and Patricia Lucero. He had four stepchildren, Karen, William, Angela, and Iris. He had five grandchildren and 8 great-grandchildren.
