= Yacamán =

Yacamán is a surname. Notable people with the surname include:

- Gustavo Yacamán (born 1991), Colombian racing driver
- Miguel José Yacamán (born 1946), Mexican physicist
