= Margaret Werner-Washburne =

Molecular biologist

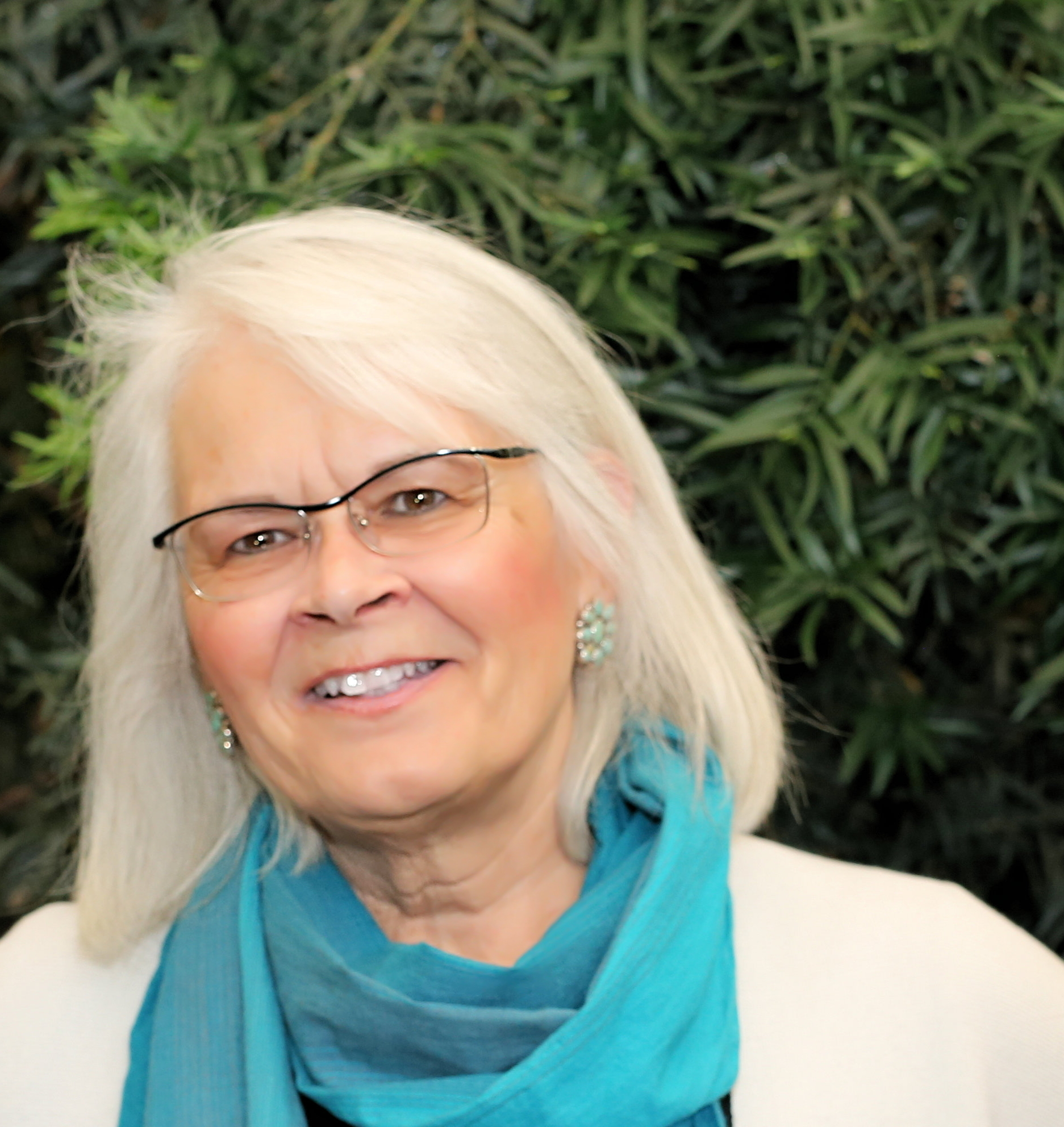
- Education: University of Wisconsin–Madison
- Known for: Yeast genomics
- Awards: Presidential Young Investigator Award, Presidential Award for Excellence in Science, Mathematics, and Engineering Mentoring
- Scientific career
- Fields: Molecular biology
- Workplaces: University of New Mexico
- Doctoral advisor: Kenneth Keegstra

Margaret (Maggie) Werner-Washburne is a molecular biologist and Regents' Professor Emeritus of Biology. at the University of New Mexico. She was previously the president (2013–2015) of the Society for the Advancement of Chicanos/Hispanics and Native Americans in Science (SACNAS), which holds the largest broadly multidisciplinary and multicultural STEM diversity conference in the U.S. A pioneer in the genomics of the stationary phase of yeast, she is known for her innovative programs to attract and retain underrepresented minorities in STEM. Werner-Washburne has made great strides in the field of Genetics. She has done gene sequencing with organisms that are disease vectors, which allows a greater understanding of genetics in general.

== Early life and education ==
Werner-Washburne grew up near a Mexican village within Fort Madison. Her father, Harold Theodore Werner, was a general practitioner and volunteer prison doctor. Her mother, Marta Lucia (née Brown y Morales), was born in Aguascalientes, Mexico. Werner-Washburne's mother and her mother's family fled Mexico for the United States during the Mexican Revolution. Werner-Washbune's mother was a prison reformer and community activist. Werner-Washburne earned her Bachelor of Arts degree in English studying poetry at Stanford University. After graduation, she traveled extensively throughout Mexico, Central and South America, Alaska, Samoa, and New Zealand. She subsequently obtained a master's degree in botany at the University of Hawaiʻi at Mānoa with Sanford Siegel, a PhD in botany at the University of Wisconsin-Madison with Kenneth Keegstra, and did postdoctoral work with National Academy of Sciences Member Elizabeth Craig.

== Career ==
Werner-Washburne joined the University of New Mexico as a faculty member in 1988. In addition to running a research lab, Werner-Washburne served as a program director at the National Science Foundation (1998–1999), for which she was given the Director's Special Service Award (1999). Werner-Washburne created the Initiative to Maximize Student Diversity (IMSD) at the University of New Mexico. More than 300 students participated in the initiative, with >70% entering PhD programs. In 2009 she was recognized with a SAGE Women Making a Difference Award for her role in creating IMSD. She has mentored more than 100 underrepresented students who have received their PhDs or who are enrolled in PhD programs. She has been a member of the Southwest Hispanic Research Institute since 2009. She has been the subject of a documentary, "The Mystery of an Ancient Gene", which described her discovery of the role of a gene called SNZ in a cell's metabolic pathway. She has written about the importance of psychosocial mentors in diversifying science and technology and institutional barriers to retaining underrepresented students in STEM. Margaret has mentored students such as Esteban Abeyta for awards including the Goldwater Scholarship that is for students in the field of mathematics, engineering, and science.

== Awards and honors ==
Werner-Washburne has received numerous honors and awards. These include: the National Science Foundation Presidential Young Investigator Award (1990), the Presidential Award for Excellence in Science, Mathematics and Engineering Mentoring (PAESMEM) (2003), the SACNAS Distinguished Scientist Award (2005), the Harvard Foundation Scientist of the Year (2011), and the AAAS Mentor Award for Lifetime Achievement (2017). She is an American Association for the Advancement of Science AAAS Fellow (2006). In 2017, in the first session of the fifty-third legislature, the House of Representatives of the New Mexico Legislature recognized her contributions to science and to the mentoring of underrepresented minorities. Also in 2017, Werner-Washburne received the AAAS Mentor Award for Lifetime Achievement

== Scientific research ==
As a postdoc in Elizabeth Craig's lab, Werner-Washburne was part of a team that discovered that a group of heat-shock proteins were chaperones. Werner-Washburne began studying the stationary phase of yeast when she moved to the University of New Mexico. She found new cell types in yeast stationary phase cultures (quiescent and non-quiescent). As a part of her research with quiescent and non-quiescent phase cultures, researchers were able to gain a greater understanding of the cells life cycle, structural components, and their reproductive abilities. In further studies, they were able to isolate the two cells, which gave them the ability to track these cells systems, gaining a greater understanding of the cells and its cycles. As part of her genomics research, she developed hyperspectral imaging to improve the signal-to-noise ratio of microarrays.

== Personal life ==
Werner-Washburne plays in the band Holy Water and Whiskey, which has won three New Mexico Music Awards: Best Vocal for "Mary Had A Baby" and Best Western for "Fancy Red Boots" in 2011 and Best Vocal Performance for "Night Hymn" in 2016.
