= Cynthia Wyels =

American mathematician

Cynthia Jean Wyels is an American mathematician whose interests include linear algebra, combinatorics, and mathematics education, and who is known for her research in graph pebbling and radio coloring of graphs. She is a professor of mathematics at California State University, Channel Islands (CSUCI) in Camarillo, California, where she also co-directs the Alliance for Minority Participation.

== Education and career ==
Wyels did her undergraduate studies at Pomona College, and earned a master's degree from the University of Michigan. She completed her Ph.D. in mathematics from the University of California, Santa Barbara in 1994; her dissertation, Isomorphism Problems In A Matrix Setting, was supervised by Morris Newman. She has taught mathematics at Weber State University and the United States Military Academy, and was chair of mathematics at California Lutheran University before moving to CSUCI.

== Awards ==
In 2012, Wyels was a winner of one of the Deborah and Franklin Haimo Awards for Distinguished College or University Teaching of Mathematics, given by the Mathematical Association of America to recognize teaching excellence that extends beyond a single institution. Her award citation particularly recognized her mentorship of Mexican and first-generation college students through the Research Experiences for Undergraduates program and through personal donations to education in Mexico, and her foundation of a mentorship program at CSUCI. In 2017, the Society for the Advancement of Chicanos/Hispanics and Native Americans in Science gave Wyels their distinguished mentor award. She received the CSUCI UndocuAlly of the Year award in 2017-2018.
