= Alvine Kamaha =

Cameroonian-born assistant professor of physics

Academic background
- Education: University of Douala; Abdus Salam International Centre for Theoretical Physics; Queen's University (PhD)

Alvine Kamaha is a Cameroonian-born assistant professor of physics at the University of California, Los Angeles (UCLA).

== Education ==
Kamaha graduated from the University of Douala in Cameroon with undergraduate and master's degrees in theoretical physics. She earned an additional master's degree at the Abdus Salam International Centre for Theoretical Physics in Trieste, Italy.

She transitioned from theoretical to experimental physics when she went on to Queen's University for her Ph.D. in astroparticle physics. Her first postdoctoral position was at Queen's University and her second was at the University at Albany in New York.

== Career ==
While pursuing her Ph.D. at Queen's University, Alvine Kamaha worked at Sudbury's SNOLAB with Gilles Gerbier, Queen's Professor and Canada Excellence Research Chair. Gerbier studied dark matter particles, and Kamaha built a new apparatus to find those particles. Her work was primarily for an experiment called New Experiments With Spheres (NEWS) with the goal of detecting dark matter particles with spheres containing a ball attached by a rod and filled with a gas which would then ionize upon interaction with dark matter particles. The electrons in the gas would move to the center of the sphere when voltage was given to the ball and that would cause an avalanche. The movement would form an electric pulse, resulting in data which would be analyzed for potential dark matter particle detection.

During the COVID-19 pandemic, Kamaha was a calibration operations coordinator for the LUX-ZEPLIN (LZ) experiment at the Sanford Underground Research Facility in Lead, South Dakota and served on the experiment's equity and inclusion committee.

Kamaha played an important role in ensuring the LZ was free of dust or any other potential contamination during the assembly stage. Kamaha then led work on the calibration system to ensure common particles were not confused with dark matter. The dark matter particles detected by the LZ are called weakly interacting massive particles or WIMPs. While initial experiments did not detect dark matter, Kamaha contributed to building the cleanest and most sensitive instrument in the world to detect WIMPs.

Kamaha is an assistant professor of physics at UCLA where she is the inaugural Keith and Cecilia Terasaki Chair in Physical Sciences. Kamaha's research group, ExCaliBUR (Experimental Detector Calibrations & Background Controls for Underground Particle Physics Research), focuses on developing technologies that can detect dark matter.

She is the recipient of the American Physical Society's 2024 Edward A. Bouchet Award for her contributions to uncovering dark matter in the universe and fostering diversity through mentorship. She is a role model for African girls who aspire to a career in science and a source of pride for Cameroon.

== Selected publications ==
- A. Kamaha, "The Quest for Dark Matter With LUX-ZEPLIN," Annual Conference and General Assembly of the African Astronomical Society, (AfAS-2022), March 2022.
- Akerib, D. S.; et al. (2020). "The LUX-ZEPLIN (LZ) radioactivity and cleanliness control programs". The European Physical Journal C. 80 (11): 1044. arXiv:2006.02506. Bibcode:2020EPJC...80.1044A. doi:10.1140/epjc/s10052-020-8420-x. hdl:2027.42/173198. S2CID 219305488.
- Akerib, D.S.; et al. (2020). "The LUX-ZEPLIN (LZ) experiment". Nuclear Instruments and Methods in Physics Research Section A: Accelerators, Spectrometers, Detectors and Associated Equipment. 953. arXiv:1910.09124. Bibcode:2020NIMPA.95363047A. doi:10.1016/j.nima.2019.163047. S2CID 204800748.
- Archambault, S.; et al. (2012). "Constraints on low-mass WIMP interactions on 19F from PICASSO". Physics Letters B. 711 (2): 153–161. arXiv:1202.1240. doi:10.1016/j.physletb.2012.03.078. hdl:2022/26456. S2CID 4285716.
- Arnaud, Q.; et al. (2018). "First results from the NEWS-G direct dark matter search experiment at the LSM". Astroparticle Physics. 97: 54–62. arXiv:1706.04934. Bibcode:2018APh....97...54A. doi:10.1016/j.astropartphys.2017.10.009. S2CID 119417744.
