= Renato Aguilera =

American biologist

Renato J. Aguilera is an American biologist specializing in immunology. He is a professor of biological sciences at the University of Texas at El Paso and director of the Research Resources Core and the Cellular Characterization core of the university's Border Biomedical Research Center. His research focuses on anti-cancer drug discovery. He has been recognized for his mentoring work and promoting inclusion of ethnic minorities in education and research. He holds a patent on mammalian DNAse II and another on the anticancer drug pyronaridine (PND). He also has over 100 research publications primarily focused and anti-cancer drug discovery.

== Career ==
Aguilera received BS and MS degrees in microbiology at the University of Texas at El Paso (UTEP), and obtained a Ph.D. from the University of California, Berkeley in 1987. From 1989 to 2002, he was a tenured professor in the department of Molecular, Cell, and Developmental Biology at the University of California, Los Angeles (UCLA), during which time he was a mentor of the university's Minority Biomedical Research Support and director of the Minority Access to Research Careers (MARC) Program. In 2002, Aguilera returned to the department of biological sciences at UTEP as a full professor and deputy director of the Border Biomedical Research Center and director of the Biology Graduate Program. From 2003-2008, he served as a member of the Board of Scientific Counselors of the National Institute of Environmental Health Sciences. In addition, he has been a long-standing fellowship reviewer for the Ford Foundation and regularly participates as a panelist in the Ford Foundation Annual Conferences. He was chair of the Minority Affairs Committee of the American Society for Cell Biology (ASCB) from 2010 to 2015; and was elected Lifetime Fellow of ASCB. In 2020, Dr. Aguilera was featured as one of 100 inspiring Hispanic/Latinx scientists in America in Cell Mentor from Cell press (https://crosstalk.cell.com/blog/100-inspiring-hispanic-latinx-scientists-in-america).

== Awards ==
In 2010, Aguilera was awarded the William A. Hinton Research Training Award from the American Society for Microbiology. He received the 2013 SACNAS (Society for the Advancement of Chicanos/Hispanics and Native Americans in Science) Distinguished Research Mentor Award. He was also awarded the McDonald's Hispanos Triunfadores Award in 2013. In 2019, he was awarded the Distinguished Scientist Award, also from SACNAS, for making significant contributions that "have a long-standing commitment to diversity and inclusion in STEM". In fall 2022, he received the Ernest Everett Just Medal and gave a lecture on his accomplishments at the ASCB annual meeting held in Washington, DC. He also wrote a related assay for Molecular Biology of the Cell about his scientific journey entitled "A Virus Changed My Life" published fall of 2022 In 2024, Dr. Aguilera was inducted into the California Academy of Science.
