= Joseph L. Bull =

American biomedical engineer

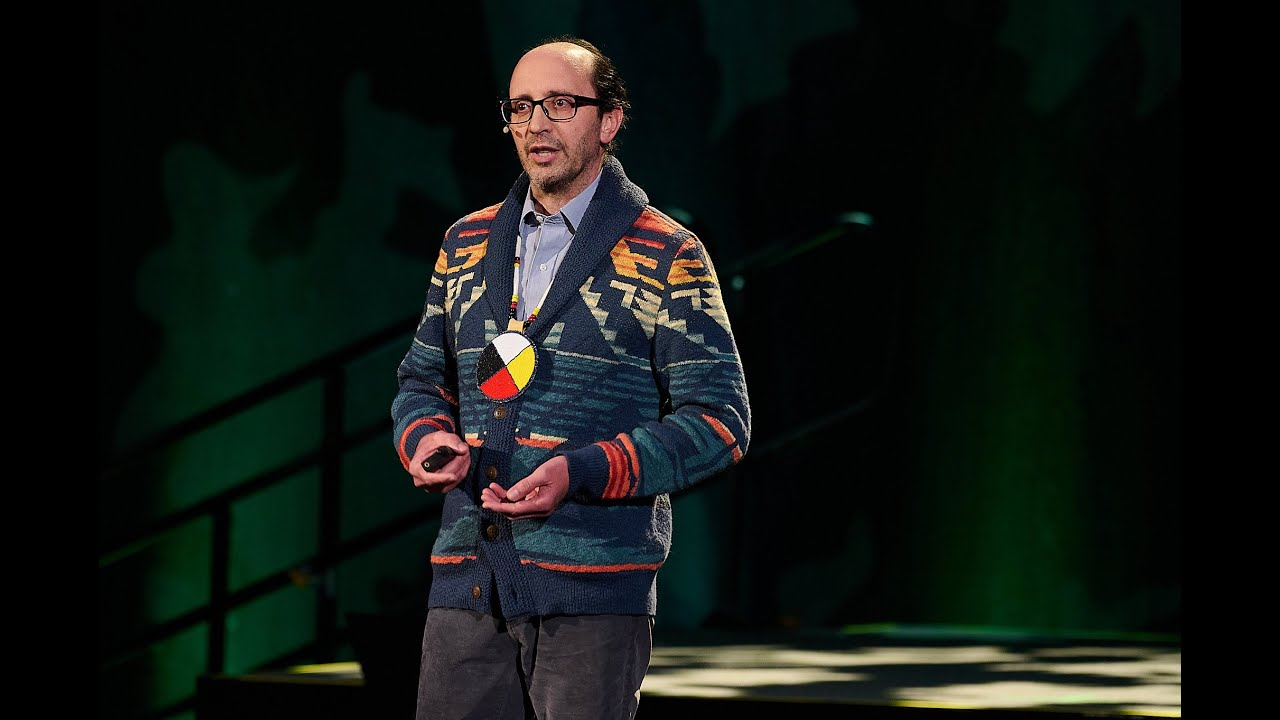
- Joseph L. Bull
- Education: Northwestern University (Ph.D.)
- Employer: New Mexico State University
- Known for: Contributions to the understanding of basic biofluid mechanics and biotransport of vascular and respiratory disease and devices
- Title: Provost and Vice President for Academic Affairs

Joseph L. Bull is an American academic, biomedical engineer, and science administrator who serves as the Provost and Vice President for Academic Affairs at New Mexico State University His scholarly work focuses on biofluid mechanics and ultrasound with applications in cardiovascular and pulmonary systems and biomedical devices. He previously served as the H. Chik M. Erzurumlu Dean of the Maseeh College of Engineering and Computer Science at Portland State University. Bull was the first enrolled member of a federally recognized Native American tribe (the Delaware Tribe of Indians, a Lenape tribe) to serve as a dean of an engineering college in the United States, and actively works to advance and support Indigenous and BIPOC participation in STEM.

== Early life and education ==
Bull is an enrolled member of the Delaware Tribe of Indians and is a first-generation college graduate. He earned his Ph.D. (2000) and M.S. (1995) in mechanical engineering from Northwestern University and his B.S. in mechanical engineering from the University of Wisconsin–Platteville in 1992, graduating summa cum laude.

== Career ==
From 2001 to 2016, Bull was a professor in the Department of Biomedical Engineering at the University of Michigan. He later joined Tulane University, where he held the John and Elsie Martinez Biomedical Engineering Chair and served as associate dean for research in the School of Science and Engineering. In 2017, Bull joined Tulane University, where he held the John and Elsie Martinez Biomedical Engineering Chair. He later served as associate dean for research in the School of Science and Engineering and assumed additional administrative responsibilities, including interim chair of the Department of Earth and Environmental Sciences.

In August 2022, Bull was appointed dean of the Maseeh College of Engineering and Computer Science at Portland State University, becoming the first Native American engineering dean in the country. At PSU, he has led initiatives to increase diversity in STEM fields and build industry partnerships. In 2024, the university received a $250,000 grant from the Alfred P. Sloan Foundation to create pathways for Indigenous students into STEM doctoral programs. In 2023, the college secured a $1.3 million partnership with Daimler Truck North America to establish faculty positions focused on vehicle electrification.

In 2026, Bull joined New Mexico State University as Provost and Vice President for Academic Affairs He has expressed his commitment to work with the entire NMSU community to collaboratively build the future of NMSU and advance NMSU’s service to all of New Mexico, including local, state, Tribal, and borderlands communities.

== Research ==
Bull’s research centers on ultrasound and biofluid mechanics, with particular emphasis on cardiovascular and pulmonary systems. Using a combination of theoretical, computational, and experimental approaches, his work has explored gas embolotherapy as a minimally invasive strategy for cancer treatment, as well as acoustic droplet vaporization for medical imaging and targeted therapeutic applications.

In parallel with this academic work, Bull has argued that engineering research benefits from broader epistemological frameworks, particularly the integration of Traditional Ecological Knowledge. He has described such knowledge as a “vital missing ingredient” in addressing complex global challenges such as climate change, a perspective that informs both his research outlook and his engagement with STEM education and policy. In 2024, he was a featured speaker at the Wings Conference, where he presented on the future of engineering education through the lens of Indigenous knowledge. In this context, he serves on the advisory board of Oregon MESA (Mathematics, Engineering, Science Achievement) and on the board of directors of Underscore Native News. In 2024, Bull received both the Executive Excellence Award from the American Indian Science and Engineering Society (AISES) and the Distinguished Scientist Award from the Society for Advancement of Chicanos/Hispanics and Native Americans in Science (SACNAS). Following these honors, he was elected to the SACNAS Board of Directors for the 2026–2028 term.

== Awards and honors ==
- Elected Fellow of the American Institute for Medical and Biological Engineering in 2014 for his "outstanding contributions to the understanding of basic biofluid mechanics and biotransport of vascular and respiratory disease and devices".
- Distinguished Scientist Award, SACNAS (2024).
- Executive Excellence Award, American Indian Science and Engineering Society (AISES) (2024).
- Sequoyah Fellow, American Indian Science and Engineering Society.
