= Maria Elena Zavala =

American plant biologist (born 1950)

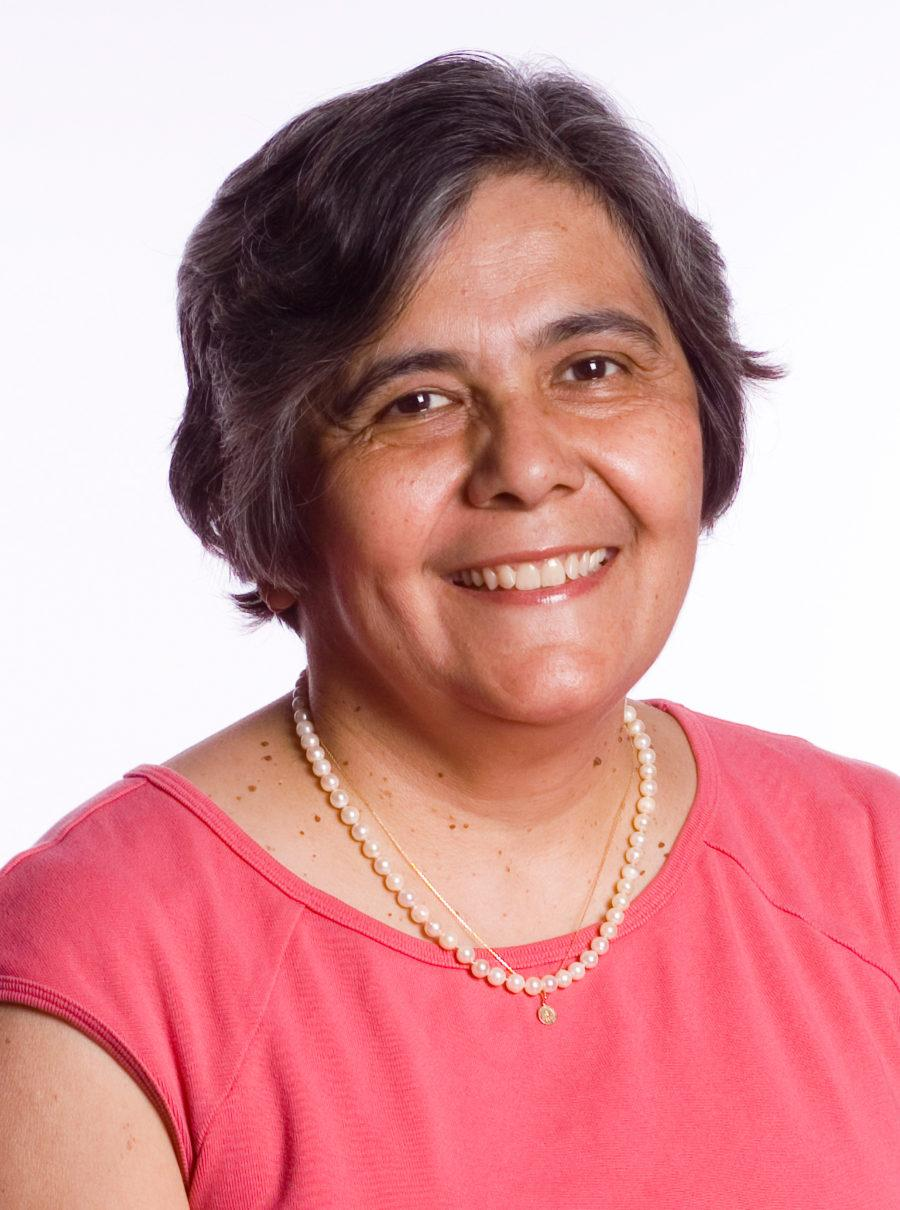
- Born: 1950 (age 75–76)
- Citizenship: United States of America
- Education: Pomona College; University of California, Berkeley (PhD)
- Awards: Presidential Award of Excellence for Science, Mathematics, and Engineering Mentoring (2000)
- Scientific career
- Fields: Botany
- Workplaces: California State University-Northridge; United States Department of Agriculture; Yale University; Michigan State University
- Patrons: Ford Foundation
- Thesis: (1978)

Maria Elena Zavala (born 1950) is an American plant biologist. She was the first Mexican-American woman to earn a PhD in botany in the United States. She is currently a full professor of biology at the California State University-Northridge, studying plant development. She is a Fellow of the American Association for the Advancement of Science, the first Latina fellow of the American Society of Plant Biologists, the first Latina fellow of the American Society of Cell Biology, and an elected fellow of the Institute of Science. In 2000, she was awarded the Presidential Award for Excellence in Science, Mathematics, and Engineering Mentoring, which recognizes individuals who have increased the participation of underrepresented minorities in their fields.

== Early life and education ==
Zavala grew up in La Verne, California, and was one of five children. When she was young, her parents were farm workers and picked lemons in the farms of Southern California.

She credits her interest in plant biology to her grandmother, who was a curandera (a traditional medicine healer), and her father, who grew roses in their garden. She carried out her first experiments in plant biology at the age of seven, when she compared the growth of lentils in the sunlight and in the shade.

In high school, she worked as a teaching assistant in chemistry and biology. She was also in her school band.

Zavala went to Pomona College, where she majored in botany in 1972. She was awarded a Ford Foundation doctoral fellowship to continue her studies, and went on to do a PhD in plant cell biology alongside William Jensen and botanist Robert Ornduff at the University of California, Berkeley, graduating in 1978. She is also the first Chicana to graduate from UC Berkeley's botany department. Zavala is credited to be the first Mexican American in the United States to graduate with a PhD in botany.

== Research and career ==
After completing her PhD she went on to work as a postdoctoral associate at Indiana University, as a staff researcher for the United States Department of Agriculture, Yale University as a postdoctoral fellow, and well as Michigan State University as a visiting professor.She has worked at the California State University-Northridge since 1988. In May of 1994 she was awarded Outstanding Professor to an American Society of Plant Physiologist member. Zavala was very busy during this time teaching two undergraduate courses, one graduate course, leading an active research program and being an adviser to master's degree candidates.

Zavala's research focuses on plant development, specifically the structure of roots. "As a researcher, she uses plants as model systems to investigate problems in development and growth." She focuses her research on beans and corn, with the aim of creating crops that can resist cooler temperatures. Her research has been funded by the National Science Foundation, the United States Department of Agriculture, and the National Institutes of Health.

Zavala has also taken a keen interest in education equity, by helping to develop science curricula, and by establishing and directing programs to champion the participation of women and minorities in science. For example, she has been involved in American Women in Science, Women in Science and Engineering, Women in Cell Biology, the American Society of Plant Biologists Minority Affairs Committee, and the American Society for Cell Biology Minority Affairs Committee. Between 2001 and 2002, Zavala also served as the first Chicana president of the Society of Advancement of Chicanos and Native Americans in Science. She spoke at the 2017 Los Angeles March for Science. In 2019, Zavala co-authored a paper advocating for minorities in her field, titled "Improving Underrepresented Minority Student Persistence in STEM." In 2022, Zavala was named a Fellow of the California Academy of Sciences.

Additionally, she has been the director of CSUN’s Maximizing Access to Research Careers (MARC) Undergraduate Student Training in Academic Research (U-STAR) program since 1990, as well as the Research Initiatives for Scientific Enhancement (RISE) since 1993.

Zavala contributed to the book "Flor y Ciencia: Chicanas in Mathematics, Science and Engineering."

== Awards and honours ==
Zavala is a Fellow of the American Association for the Advancement of Science. In 2000, she became the first woman to become president of SACNAS, the Society for the Advancement of Chicanos and Native Americans in Science, and in 2016 she became the first Latina fellow of the American Society of Plant Biologists. The next year, she became the first Latina fellow of the American Society for Cell Biology. William Jefferson Clinton awarded her the Presidential Award for Excellence in Science, Mathematics, and Engineering Mentoring in 2000. In 2020 Zavala was named one of the 100 most inspiring Latinx/Hispanic scientists in the United States by Cell Press journal. In 2024, Zavala helped get about $490,000 in funding to support a program that helps minority students prepare for careers in biomedical research
