= Eugene Cota-Robles =

Eugene H. Cota-Robles (July 13, 1926 – September 12, 2012) was a professor emeritus of biology at the University of California, Santa Cruz (UCSC), and held administrative positions within the University of California (UC) system. He served as academic vice chancellor at UCSC and provost of Crown College. Cota-Robles was recognized for his work in higher education, particularly his contributions to affirmative action, diversity, and faculty development.

== Early life and education ==
Eugene H. Cota-Robles was born on July 13, 1926, in Nogales, Arizona, to Amado and Feliciana Cota-Robles. His parents, who were both elementary school teachers from Pueblo Nuevo, Sonora, Mexico, emigrated to the United States. He grew up in Tucson, Arizona, and graduated from high school in 1944. He served in the United States Navy during World War II as a signalman aboard the USS Baltimore in the Pacific. Following his discharge in 1946, he pursued higher education at the University of Arizona, earning a Bachelor of Science in Bacteriology in 1950. Cota-Robles continued his studies at the University of California, Davis, earning a Ph.D. in microbiology in 1956.

== Career ==
Cota-Robles began his academic career as a faculty member at the University of California, Riverside. He served as chairman of the Department of Microbiology at Pennsylvania State University from 1970 to 1973, before returning to the University of California in 1973. At UC Santa Cruz, he became professor of biology and academic vice chancellor, a position he held until 1979. He was a founding member and second president of the Society for Advancement of Chicanos and Native Americans in Science (SACNAS), as well as a founding member and past president of the National Chicano Council on Higher Education. He served on the National Science Board (1978–1984) and the board of trustees of the Carnegie Foundation for the Advancement of Teaching. From 1982 to 1986, he served as the Provost of Crown College at UCSC. He later worked in the University of California Office of the President as Assistant Vice President for Academic Advancement from 1986 to 1991. Upon his retirement in 1991, the University of California Regents established the Eugene H. Cota-Robles Fellowships for graduate students in his honor.

== Personal life ==
Cota-Robles died on September 12, 2012, at Edward Hospital in Naperville, Illinois. Cota-Robles married Gun Cota-Robles. He had three children, Erik Cota-Robles, Feliciana Farran, and Peter Cota-Robles. He had six grandchildren.
