= Marigold Linton =

Native American cognitive psychologist (born 1936)

- Born: 1936 (age 89–90); Banning, California
- Citizenship: Morongo Band of Mission Indians and U.S.
- Occupations: professor, psychologist
- Board member of: Society for Advancement of Chicanos and Native Americans in Science, National Indian Education Association
- Relatives: Antonio Garra (Cupeño, ca. 1800–1852)

Academic background
- Education: University of California, Riverside
- Thesis: A Test of the Two Parameter Definition of Drive (D) and the Influence of Drive Upon Learning (sHr) (1958)

Academic work
- Discipline: cognitive psychology
- Institutions: San Diego State University, Arizona State University, University of Kansas, University of Texas

Marigold Linton (born 1936) is a Native American cognitive psychologist and citizen of the Morongo Band of Cahuilla Mission Indians. In 1964, she became the first Native American to earn a doctorate in psychology. In 1974, she co–founded the National Indian Education Association. Her research in long-term memory is widely cited in psychology. She is director for mathematics and science initiatives in the University of Texas system, where she is responsible for bringing minority students into those two fields. She has been president of the Society for Advancement of Chicanos and Native Americans in Science.

== Early life ==
Marigold Lorelei Linton was born in Banning, California, in 1936 and is Cahuilla and Cupeño. A great-great-granddaughter of Antonio Garra, war chief of the Cupeno who organized an 1847 Indian insurrection against Agoston Haraszthy, San Diego County's first sheriff, Marigold Linton was born on the Morongo Reservation in Southern California. Her grandfather was Sadakichi Hartmann. Raised in poverty, she overcame hardship and adversity to become in 1954 the first Indian from a California reservation to attend college. Attending the newly opened University of California, Riverside, she earned straight As to obtain her B.A. in Psychology and completed two publications by the time she entered graduate school at the University of Iowa, eventually obtaining her Ph.D. from UCLA. She received her PhD in 1964, and this made her the first Native American to earn a doctorate in psychology.

== Career ==
Linton began her academic career at San Diego State University, where she advocated for faculty members who met tenure criteria to be placed on the tenure track, including women (Trimble & Clearing-Sky, 2009). She later became a full professor and, in 1974, became the first woman hired as a full professor at the University of Utah. Her research in cognitive psychology focused on long-term and autobiographical memory.

Linton also worked to expand educational opportunities for American Indian students. At Arizona State University, she directed programs focused on American Indian education, teacher training, and educational development (Trimble & Clearing-Sky, 2009). At the University of Kansas, she served as Director of American Indian Outreach and developed a partnership with Haskell Indian Nations University that expanded opportunities for Native students in biomedical sciences through research experiences, tutoring, laboratory opportunities, faculty development, and advanced training. The partnership also supported improvements to science and mathematics curricula at Haskell (Trimble & Clearing-Sky, 2009).

To support biomedical research for American Indian students and faculty at the University of Kansas and Haskell Indian Nations Universityshe collaborated and help develop funding for the Bridges to the Baccalaureate programs, Initiative for Maximizing Student Development (IMSD), Research Initiative for Scientific Enhancement (RISE), Post Baccalaureate Research Education Program (PREP), and the Institutional Research and Academic Career Development Award (IRACDA). Helped raise more than $18 million in grants for the Kansas-Haskell partnership.

One of the founding member of SACNAS (Society for Advancement of Chicanos and Native Americans in Science). SACNAS advocates opportunities in science education for Chicano/Latino, Native American, and other underrepresented minority students to excel in science based careers. SACNAS is composed of students, K-12 educators, administrators, industry scientists, and science professors. From 2004 until 2007 Linton was the President of SACNAS Board of Directors.

She collaborated with others in founding the National Indian Education Association. The NIEA was established in 1969. The NIEA is a non-profit advocacy organization that helps ensure that American Indian, Alaskan Native, and Native Hawaiian educators, tribal leaders, school administrators, teachers, parents, and students, have a voice in education. The NIEA today has more than 10,000 members.

== Significant appointments ==
She has had a number of significant national appointments including: Committee on Equality of Opportunity in Science and Engineering (CEOSE), congressionally mandated NSF Committee (2006–2009); NIH National Institutes of General Medical Science, National Advisory Research Resources Council (1982–1986); Carnegie Foundation for the Advancement of Teaching, Board of Directors (1977–1985); National Research Council, Committee on Assessment for NIH Minority Research/Training Programs, III (2001–2004); and the National Academy of Sciences, Fellowship Office Advisory Committee (2009–2011).

== Published works ==
- Linton, M. (1982) 'Transformations of memory in everyday life', in Neisser, U. (ed.) Memory Observed: Remembering in Natural Contexts, San Francisco, Freeman.
- Linton, M. (1986) 'Ways of searching and the contents of memory', in Rubin, D.C. (ed.) Autobiographical Memory, Cambridge, Cambridge University Press.
- Andress, V., Franzini, L., & Linton, M. (1974, April). A comparison of homosexual and heterosexual responses to the Menninger Word Association Test. Journal of Clinical Psychology, 30(2), 205–207.
- Eisman, E., Linton, M., & Theios, J. (1960, August). The relationship between response strength and one parameter of the hunger drive. Journal of Comparative and Physiological Psychology, 53(4), 359–363.
- Guenther, R., & Linton, M. (1975, March). Mechanisms of temporal coding. Journal of Experimental Psychology: Human Learning and Memory, 1(2), 182–187.
- Linton, M., Jewett, M., & Brotsky, S. (1970, December). Prediction of paired-associate learning from a complex indicator of associative strength. Psychonomic Science, 21(6), 354–355
- Linton, M. & Gallo, P.S., Jr. (1975). The practical statistician: Simplified handbook of Statistics. Brooks/Cole.
- Linton, M. (1988). The maintenance of knowledge: Some long-term specific and generic changes. Practical aspects of memory: Current research and issues, Vol. 1: Memory in everyday life (pp. 378–384). John Wiley & Sons.
- Linton, M. (1996). The maintenance of a complex knowledge base after seventeen years. The psychology of learning and motivation: Advances in research and theory, Vol. 35 (pp. 127–163). Academic Press.
