= Elma González =

Mexican-born American plant cell biologist

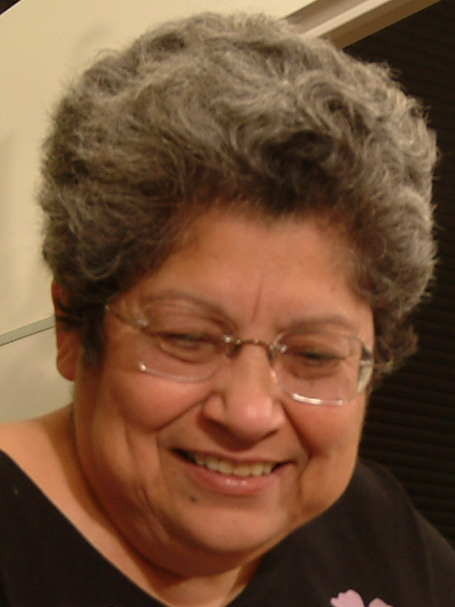
- Dr. Elma González in 2017.
- Born: 6 June 1942 (age 84); Tamaulipas, Mexico
- Education: Rutgers University

Elma L. González (born June 6, 1942) is a Mexican-born American plant cell biologist. She is Professor Emerita of Ecology and Evolutionary Biology at the University of California, Los Angeles. In 1974, she was appointed professor of cell and molecular biology at the University of California, Los Angeles. At the time, she was the only Mexican American woman scientist in the University of California system faculty. Professor Martha Zúñiga at the University of California, Santa Cruz, appointed in 1990, was the second. In 2004, the Society for the Advancement of Chicanos/Hispanics and Native Americans in Science recognized González with a Distinguished Scientist Award.

== Early life and education ==
González was born in Ciudad Guerrero, in Tamaulipas, Mexico. She is the daughter of Efigenia and Nestor González, both migrant farm workers. At the age of six, her parents brought her to the U.S. Her interest in biology began by observing the animals and wildlife on the ranch her father worked on. She did not start school until the age of nine. In the hometown school Gonzalez attended, counselors gave no expectations for the kids to continue their education towards college. Gonzalez went against her family's expectations and was admitted into a University and became the first of her family to attend. As a teenager growing up in South Texas, and during college, Gonzalez worked as a migrant farm worker with her family picking cucumbers, cotton, and sugar beets. Traveling with her family to pick crops meant that González and her siblings started school late each year. Gonzalez went to college at Texas Women's University (TWU) in Denton, Texas where she studied biology and chemistry and graduated in 1965. She later worked in a laboratory at Baylor Medical School in Houston, Texas, then at Southwest Medical School in Dallas, Texas, which motivated her to pursue graduate school in biology. She received her PhD in cell biology from Rutgers University in 1972, for a dissertation titled "Peroxisomes and the Regulation of the Capacity for Assimilation of Two-Carbon Units in Saccharomyces cerevisiae". She did postdoctoral work in the laboratory of Professor Harry Beevers at UC Santa Cruz.

== Career and service ==
González is one of the founding members of the Society for the Advancement of Chicanos/Hispanics and Native Americans in Science, an organization which was founded in 1973. In 1977, as an assistant professor, González was awarded a grant from the National Chicano Council on higher education sponsored by the Ford Foundation. The grant was designed to increase the number of Chicano faculty in U.S. higher education.

She was promoted to associate professor at the University of California, Los Angeles in 1981, and then to full professor in 1993. At UCLA, González was the director of the Minority Access to Research Careers (MARC) program funded by the National Institutes of Health to support undergraduates completing their education and research projects in science. In a news article printed in 1991, it alluded to her work as having been a part of a group of board members that reviewed proposals of the NSF's new Alliance for Minority Participation Program to better prepare & bring in minority students into the science and engineering programs.

In 2005, she was the recipient of the University of California, Los Angeles' first Distinguished Teaching Award for "superb mentorship" to undergraduates engaged in scholarly activities.

== Research ==
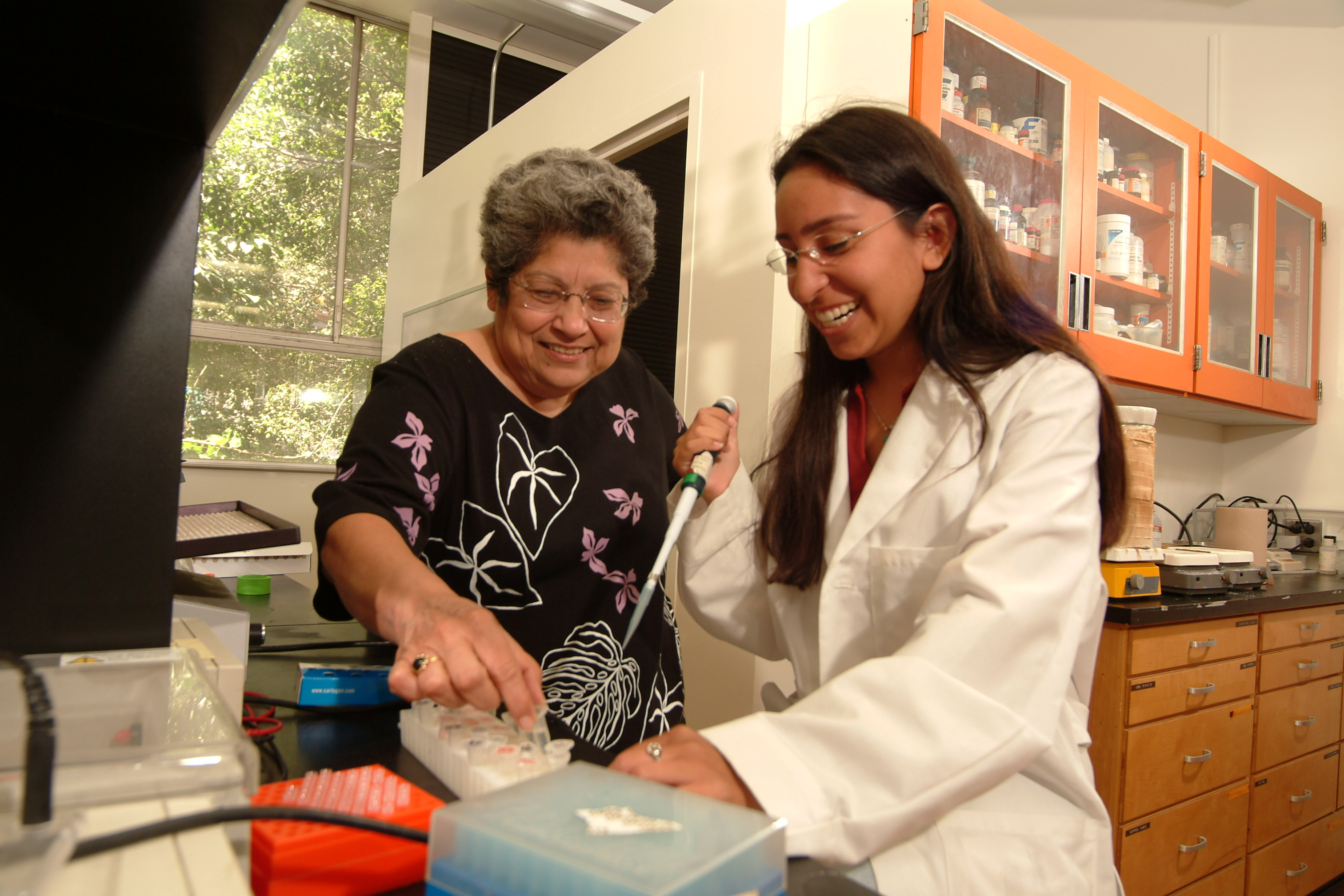
Dr. Elma González and her student

González is a plant cell biologist who studied the biological process of calcification in a group of algae known as coccolithophorids. She has written about the unusual ability of coccolith vacuoles to facilitate calcification, a significant part of the global carbon cycle. An ATPase removes protons in exchange for ATP from the vacuole, allowing the formation of carbon dioxide, a mechanism linking photosynthesis with calcification. She has suggested that an increase in ocean acidification together with increased nutrients might negatively impact the adaptive value of calcification.

== Personal life ==
González's life story was part of an anthology of autobiographies by Chicanas in STEM, edited by Norma E. Cantú.

== Selected publications ==
- Kwon, Duck-Kee; González, Elma L. 2004. Localization of Ca2+-stimulated ATPase in the coccolith-producing compartment of cells of Pleurochrysis sp. (Prymnesiophyceae). Journal of Phycology 30(4):689 - 695. DOI:10.1111/j.0022-3646.1994.00689.x
- Corstjens, Paul; González, Elma L. 2004. Effects of nitrogen and phosphorus availability on the expression of the coccolith-vesicle V-ATPase (subunit c) of Pleurochrysis (Haptophyta). Journal of Phycology 40(1):82-87. DOI:10.1046/j.1529-8817.2004.02154.x
- Araki, Yoko; González Elma L. 2002. V- and P-type Ca2+-stimulated ATPases in a calcifying strain of Pleurochrysis sp. (Haptophyceae). Journal of Phycology 34(1):79 - 88. DOI:10.1046/j.1529-8817.1998.340079.x
- Israel, Alvaro A; Gonzalez, Elma L. 1996. Photosynthesis and inorganic carbon utilization in Pleurochrysis sp. (Haptophyta), a coccolithophorid alga. Marine Ecology Progress Series 137(1-3). DOI:10.3354/meps137243
