= Adriana Briscoe =

American evolutionary biologist

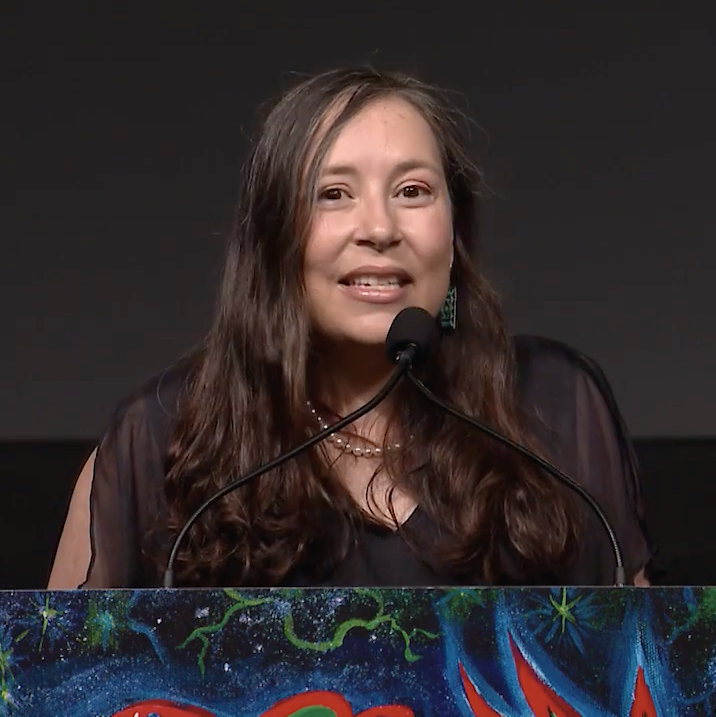
- Briscoe in 2018
- Born: Honolulu, Hawaii
- Education: Harvard University, Stanford University
- Known for: Study of opsins, butterflies, coloration and evolutionary physiology
- Awards: Guggenheim Fellowship; Fellow of the American Association for the Advancement of Science; Fellow of the Royal Entomological Society; Distinguished Scientist of the SACNAS; Fellow of the California Academy of Sciences
- Scientific career
- Fields: Evolutionary biology
- Workplaces: University of California, Irvine

Adriana Darielle Mejía Briscoe is an American evolutionary biologist and professor of ecology and evolutionary biology at the School of Biological Sciences at the University of California, Irvine. She specializes in research questions at the intersection of sensory physiology, color vision, coloration, animal behavior, molecular evolution, and genomics.

Briscoe's work is largely focused on questions surrounding vision in butterflies with a specific focus on establishing links between genetic expression patterns leading to coloration and vision with the physiological and behavioral traits of butterflies. Briscoe has discovered and systematically demonstrated over the course of her career that butterflies are a unique organism to enable such studies on account of the diversity of photoreceptor proteins, or opsins, which are expressed in the retina of a butterfly. She is also known for her studies on gene expression of phototransduction proteins, duplication events in opsin genes, the discovery of new opsins, and the discovery of pigments which present in the wing coloration patterns of butterflies. Her studies have also demonstrated the co-evolution of butterfly vision and wing color at a molecular-level as a strategy for secure inter-species communication.

For her research contributions, Briscoe has been recognized as an elected fellow of the American Association for the Advancement of Science and the Royal Entomological Society. Briscoe has also been recognized as a Distinguished Scientist of the Society for the Advancement of Chicanos/Hispanics and Native Americans in Science (SACNAS). In 2021, she was awarded a Guggenheim Fellowship.

== Early life and education ==
Briscoe was born in Honolulu, Hawaii and was raised in Colton, California, where she graduated from Colton High School in 1988. Briscoe comes from a family of Mexican American teachers and was especially inspired to pursue higher education by her family members and most especially her maternal grandmother, Consuelo Lozano, and her mother, Loretta Mejía. In 1937, Briscoe's maternal grandmother was the only Spanish-named woman attending Colton High in San Bernardino County to graduate. Briscoe's mother was the only Spanish-named woman from San Bernardino county to graduate from the University of California, Riverside in 1965. Her father, Peter Briscoe, was an academic librarian and is a writer of short stories and a novella. She jumped a grade in school and found herself inspired by her new teacher who showed them fossil teeth and taught them songs to remember the name of dinosaurs.

After graduating high school, Briscoe went on to study at Stanford University, where she received a B.A. in philosophy, a B.S. in biological sciences and a M.A. in philosophy. As an undergraduate, she conducted field work at the Rocky Mountain Biological Laboratory with Professor Ward Watt. She continued her graduate studies at Harvard University, specializing in evolutionary biology where her Ph.D. advisers were Naomi Pierce and Richard Lewontin. After receiving her Ph.D. she was a post-doctoral fellow at the University of Arizona and at the University of Colorado, Denver, where she was supported with a fellowship from the Ford Foundation. In 2012, Briscoe was an overseas visiting research fellow at St John's College, Cambridge. She has been a faculty affiliate of the BEACON Center for the Study of Evolution in Action since 2012. In the area of policy and higher education, Briscoe has been vocal on her support of government action to get more Latino individuals to teach science.

== Research, career, and service ==
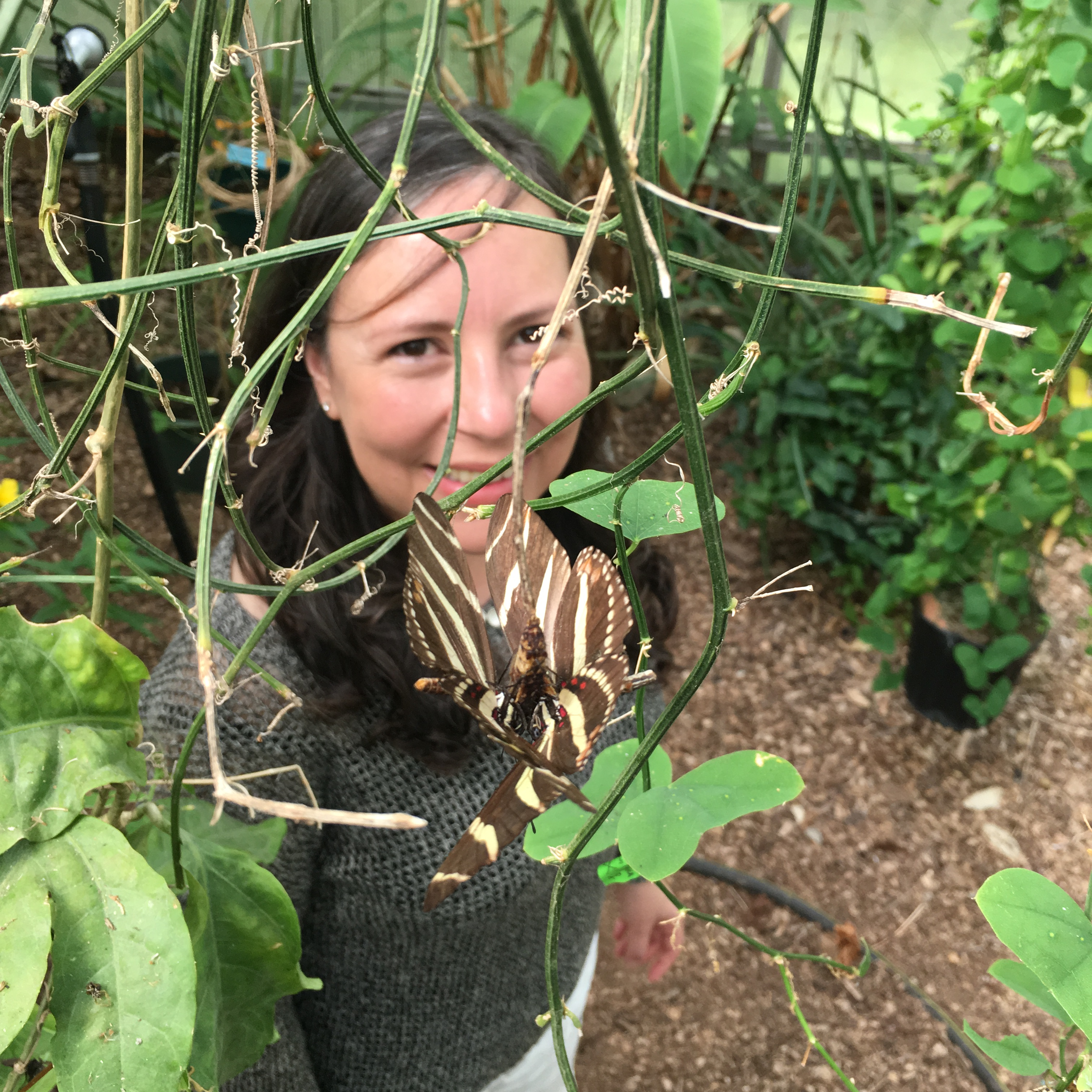
Briscoe observing butterflies, a focus of her research

Briscoe's research career has been largely distinguished by her studies on the evolution of vision in butterflies. She is particularly well known for the discovery of new opsins, her application of functional approaches for the study of light-sensitive pigments which lead to color vision, and her study of the links between genetic expression of these proteins and functional behavior. Her investigations have been largely situated in the field of molecular evolution.

Since her time as a graduate student at Harvard University, Briscoe has been involved with the discovery of opsins which are key in butterfly vision alongside studying the expression levels of these photoreceptors as a function of functional butterfly behavior. Her studies have also sought to elucidate the role and emergence of double gene duplication events in opsin protein expression as a function of environmental stimuli. Such double duplication events have been hypothesized to play a key role in the evolution of color vision in primates, including humans. As Briscoe herself has addressed, gene duplication and mutation events in opsins more broadly account for a large fraction of genetic changes associated with human retinal diseases, including retinitis pigmentosa. She now works at University of California, Irvine as a Professor in the Department of Ecology and Evolutionary Biology. Professor Briscoe promotes intellectual inquiry and curiosity. For example, in her insect ecophysiology class of Spring 2026, she invited Indigenous artist Merced Maldonado as a guest lecturer. Maldonado explained the process of how silkmoth cocoons are used to make garments and shed light on their used within an indigenous culture, the Pascua Yaqui Tribe.

Briscoe's career has been distinguished by the study of diverse butterfly species and international collaborations which have supported these investigations. Her recent research collaboration between her team and that of Jorge Llorente Bousequets from the UNAM-Facultad De Ciencas was particularly productive and led to the discovery that the Heliconius butterfly species differentially expresses one or two genes for an opsin photoreceptor which is uniquely sensitive to ultra-violet reflecting wing colors. This discovery was particularly significant as it demonstrated that the Heliconius butterfly had co-evolved two traits, ultra-violet photoreceptors and ultra-violet reflecting wing pigments, as an effectively private (or secure) inter-species communication channel. In the course of the investigations, Briscoe and collaborators also identified the chemical composition of the evolved pigment which, in combination with the nanostructured nature of scale cells on the butterfly wing, leads to the phenomena of UV-yellow butterfly wing coloration.

Her team's continued investigations on ultra-violet opsins in the Heliconius erato butterfly have elucidated additional layers of diversification in gene expression which are linked to a butterfly's gender. Specifically, females of the species have two different UV receptors, UVRh1 and UVRh2, while males only have one (UVRh2). These studies are of particular interest towards future investigations on understanding the evolutionary mechanisms leading to the emergence of novel opsins.

In the area of service to the scientific community, Briscoe served as associate editor for the journal Molecular Biology and Evolution from 2005 until 2012. Since 2015, she has been an editorial board member of Physiological and Biochemical Zoology. She served as council member for the American Genetic Association from 2011 to 2014. She also served as an advisory board member of the National Evolutionary Synthesis Center (NESCENT) from 2010 until 2012. Since beginning her independent research group in 2002, Briscoe has mentored fourteen graduate students and postdocs.

== Awards and honors ==
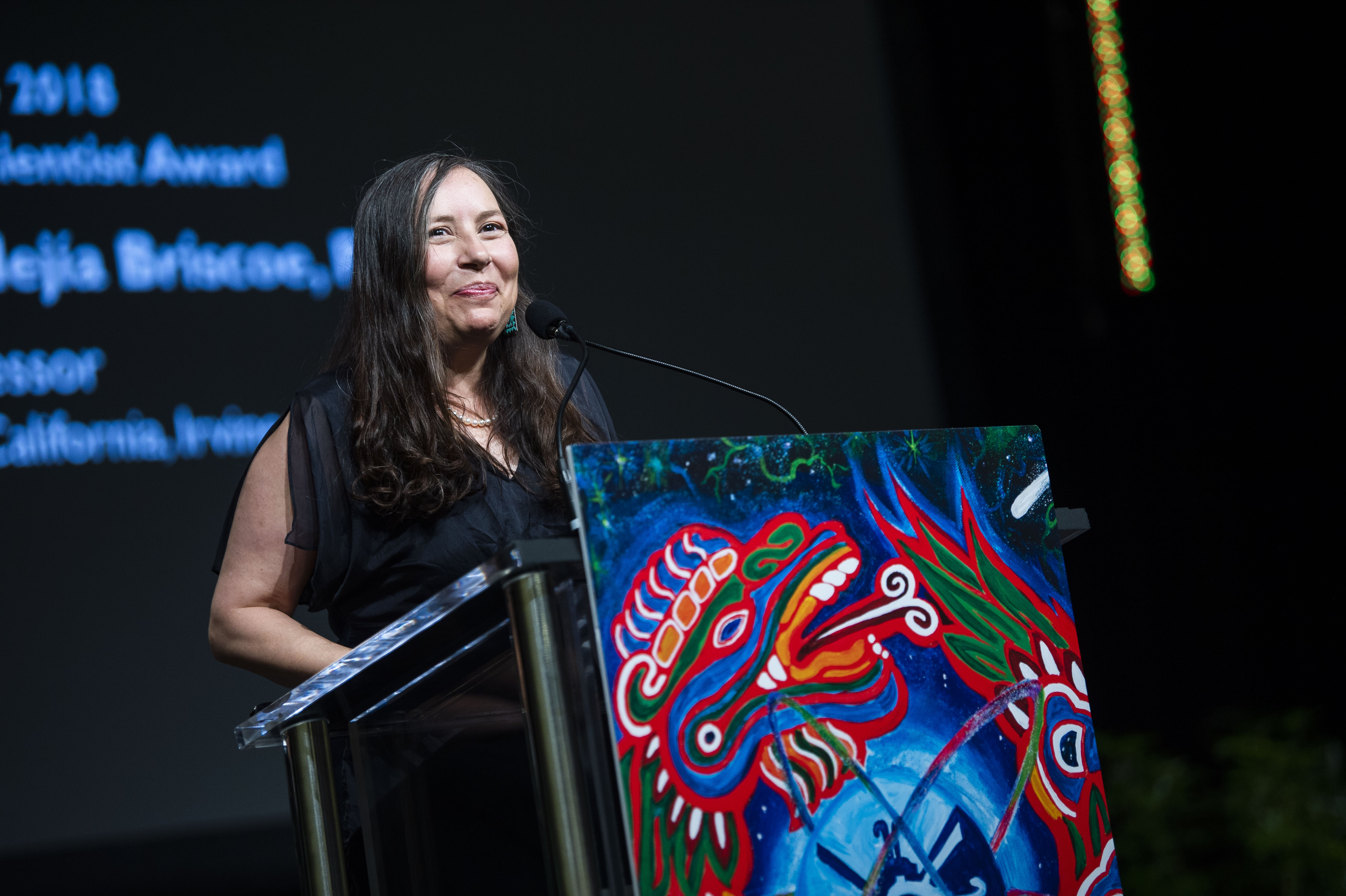
Receiving the 2018 SACNAS Distinguished Scientist award

- Elected member, National Academy of Sciences (2024)
- Elected member, American Academy of Arts and Sciences (2022)
- Guggenheim Fellowship (2021)
- Scientific Advisory Board Member, Max Planck Institute (2019-2024)
- Distinguished Scientist Award, Society for the Advancement of Chicanos/Hispanics and Native Americans in Science (SACNAS) (2018)
- Fellow, American Association for the Advancement of Science (2017)
- Fellow, Royal Entomological Society (2018)
- Fellow, California Academy of Sciences (2018)
- Plenary speaker, Entomological Society of America (2017)
- Overseas Visiting Scholar, St. John's College, University of Cambridge (2012)
- James P. Holland Named Lecture, Indiana University (2011)
- Advisory Board Member, National Evolutionary Synthesis Center (NESCENT)(2010-2012)
- Federation of American Societies for Experimental Biology Diversity Award Burroughs Wellcome Fund Research Award (2008)
- Elected member, Sigma Xi (2004)
- Postdoctoral Fellowship, Ford Foundation (2000-2001)
- Predoctoral fellowship, Howard Hughes Medical Institute (1993-1998)

== Select publications ==
Briscoe has a publication record in the areas of physiological genomics, molecular evolution, color, vision, and sensory biology. Some of her works are listed below:

- Zaccardi, Guillermo; Kelber, Almut; Sison-Mangus, Marilou P.; Briscoe, Adriana D. (May 15, 2006). "Color discrimination in the red range with only one long-wavelength sensitive opsin". Journal of Experimental Biology. 209 (10): 1944–1955. doi:10.1242/jeb.02207. ISSN 0022-0949. PMID 16651559.
- Dasmahapatra, Kanchon K.; Walters, James; Briscoe, Adriana D; and, 77 co-authors (2012). "Butterfly genome reveals promiscuous exchange of mimicry adaptations among species". Nature. 487 (7405): 94–98. Bibcode:2012Natur.487...94T. doi:10.1038/nature11041. ISSN 1476-4687. PMC 3398145. PMID 22722851.
- Briscoe, Adriana D. (June 1, 2008). "Reconstructing the ancestral butterfly eye: focus on the opsins". Journal of Experimental Biology. 211 (11): 1805–1813. doi:10.1242/jeb.013045. ISSN 0022-0949. PMID 18490396.
- Briscoe, Adriana D.; Bybee, Seth; Bernard, Gary D.; Yuan, Furong; Sison-Mangus, Marilou P.; Reed, Robert D.; Warren, Andrew D.; Llorente-Bousquets, Jorge; Chao, Chuan-Chin (February 23, 2010). "Positive selection of a duplicated UV-sensitive visual pigment coincides with wing pigment evolution in Heliconius butterflies". Proceedings of the National Academy of Sciences. 107 (8): 3628–3633. Bibcode:2010PNAS..107.3628B. doi:10.1073/pnas.0910085107. ISSN 0027-8424. PMC 2840532. PMID 20133601.
- Bybee, Seth M.; Yuan, Furong; Ramstetter, Monica D.; Llorente-Bousquets, Jorge; Reed, Robert D.; Osorio, Daniel; Briscoe, Adriana D. (2012). "UV photoreceptors and UV-yellow wing pigments in Heliconius butterflies allow a color signal to serve both mimicry and intraspecific communication". The American Naturalist. 179 (1): 38–51. doi:10.1086/663192. ISSN 1537-5323. PMID 22173459. S2CID 205998104.
- Briscoe, Adriana D.; Andolfatto, Peter; Llorente-Bousquets, Jorge; Smith, Gilbert; Aardema, Matthew L.; Zhen, Ying; Yuan, Furong; McCulloch, Kyle J. (September 1, 2017). "Sexual Dimorphism and Retinal Mosaic Diversification following the Evolution of a Violet Receptor in Butterflies". Molecular Biology and Evolution. 34 (9): 2271–2284. doi:10.1093/molbev/msx163. ISSN 0737-4038. PMID 28505307.
- Briscoe, Adriana D.; Bernard, Gary D.; Szeto, Allan S.; Nagy, Lisa M.; White, Richard H. (April 14, 2003). "Not all butterfly eyes are created equal: rhodopsin absorption spectra, molecular identification, and localization of ultraviolet-, blue-, and green-sensitive rhodopsin-encoding mRNAs in the retina of Vanessa cardui". The Journal of Comparative Neurology. 458 (4): 334–349. doi:10.1002/cne.10582. ISSN 0021-9967. PMID 12619069. S2CID 33070553.
- Briscoe, A. D. (2001). "Functional diversification of lepidopteran opsins following gene duplication". Molecular Biology and Evolution. 18 (12): 2270–2279. doi:10.1093/oxfordjournals.molbev.a003773. ISSN 0737-4038. PMID 11719576.
- Briscoe, A. D. (2000). "Six opsins from the butterfly Papilio glaucus: molecular phylogenetic evidence for paralogous origins of red-sensitive visual pigments in insects". Journal of Molecular Evolution. 51 (2): 110–121. Bibcode:2000JMolE..51..110B. doi:10.1007/s002390010071. ISSN 0022-2844. PMID 10948267. S2CID 22650575.
- Briscoe, A. D. (1998). "Molecular diversity of visual pigments in the butterfly Papilio glaucus". Die Naturwissenschaften. 85 (1): 33–35. Bibcode:1998NW.....85...33B. doi:10.1007/s001140050448. ISSN 0028-1042. PMID 9484709. S2CID 18761928.
