= Jorge Gardea-Torresdey =

Mexican-American chemist and academic

Jorge Gardea-Torresdey is a Mexican-American chemist and academic. He is the Dudley Professor of Chemistry and Environmental Science and Engineering at the University of Texas at El Paso (UTEP). In 2002, he led a team that discovered the ability of alfalfa to take up gold from soil and to store it in the form of nanoparticles.

== Biography ==
Gardea-Torresdey grew up in Parral, a mining area in Northern Mexico. He went back and forth to the United States as a child. He was raised in a business family, and he had nine siblings, all of whom were younger. From an early age, Gardea-Torresdey was interested in chemistry, to the disappointment of his family of entrepreneurs. He obtained a doctorate at New Mexico State University, where he studied under Dennis Darnall and Joseph Wang.

Gardea-Torresdey joined the UTEP faculty in 1994 and became the chemistry department head from 2001 to 2018. His work focuses on the use of nanoparticles. In 2002, Gardea-Torresdey led a team from UTEP using technology at the Stanford Synchrotron Radiation Lightsource (SSRL) to study phytoremediation in alfalfa plants. The team demonstrated that alfalfa would extract gold from the medium in which it was growing and that it would store the gold in the form of nanoparticles. Gardea-Torresdey estimated that, after some refinement, the process could harvest gold amounting to about 20 percent of the weight of the plant.

He received the 2009 Distinguished Scientist Award from the Society for Advancement of Chicanos/Hispanics and Native Americans in Science (SACNAS). He was named a Minnie Stevens Piper Professor in 2012, one of ten in Texas that year, in recognition of his research and classroom accomplishments.
