= Carlos Lousto =

Argentine astrophysicist

Carlos O. Lousto
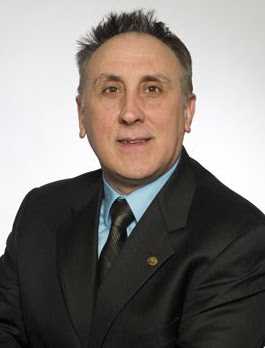
- Born: Buenos Aires, Argentina
- Education: National University of La Plata (PhD, 1987); University of Buenos Aires (PhD, 1992)
- Known for: Binary black hole simulations, gravitational recoil of black holes
- Awards: Fellow of the American Physical Society (2012); Special Breakthrough Prize in Fundamental Physics (2016); Edward A. Bouchet Award (2019); RAICES Award (2024)
- Scientific career
- Fields: Numerical relativity, gravitational wave astronomy, black hole physics
- Workplaces: Rochester Institute of Technology

Carlos O. Lousto is an Argentine-American astrophysicist and Distinguished Professor in the School of Mathematical Sciences at Rochester Institute of Technology (RIT). He is known for his contributions to numerical relativity and the simulation of binary black hole mergers, work that played a role in the interpretation of the first direct detection of gravitational waves by LIGO in 2015.

== Education and early career ==
Lousto holds two doctoral degrees: one in astronomy from the National University of La Plata, completed in 1987, in which he studied accretion disks around black holes and the internal structure of neutron stars; and one in physics from the University of Buenos Aires, completed in 1992, focusing on quantum field theory in curved spacetime. He received an Alexander von Humboldt Foundation fellowship in 1993.

Lousto joined RIT in 2007 as a founding member of the Center for Computational Relativity and Gravitation (CCRG), where he serves as co-director. In 2023, he was named Distinguished Professor, the highest academic title at RIT.

== Research ==
Lousto's research spans black hole perturbation theory, numerical relativity, and gravitational wave astronomy. He has authored or co-authored approximately 300 scientific publications, with research funded by the National Science Foundation and NASA.

=== Binary black hole simulations ===
In 2005, Lousto was part of a team with Manuela Campanelli, Yosef Zlochower, and Pedro Marronetti that developed the "moving puncture" approach to simulate the merger of two black holes on a supercomputer, one of two independent groups to achieve this breakthrough. This method was subsequently used to interpret signals detected by LIGO, including the first direct observation of gravitational waves in September 2015.

Lousto's simulations demonstrated that merging supermassive black holes can produce gravitational recoil velocities of up to 5,000 km/s, fast enough to eject the remnant black hole from most galaxies. He and collaborator James Healy also discovered the "flip-flopping" behavior of black hole spins in binary systems.

=== Extreme mass ratio simulations ===
Lousto has pushed the boundaries of numerical relativity by simulating binary black holes with mass ratios up to 128:1, a record in the field. These simulations are important for informing the design of next-generation gravitational wave detectors such as the Laser Interferometer Space Antenna (LISA).

=== Supercomputing ===
To support his simulation work, Lousto designed several dedicated supercomputer clusters, including the Funes cluster at the University of Texas at Brownsville and the NewHorizon, BlueSky, and GreenPrairies clusters at RIT.

== Awards and honors ==
- 1993 – Alexander von Humboldt Foundation fellowship
- 2006, 2016 – Research acknowledged in the United States Congressional Record
- 2012 – Elected Fellow of the American Physical Society, cited for contributions at the interface between perturbation theory and numerical relativity
- 2016 – Special Breakthrough Prize in Fundamental Physics, shared with the LIGO collaboration
- 2019 – Edward A. Bouchet Award from the American Physical Society
- 2023 – Distinguished Professor, Rochester Institute of Technology
- 2024 – RAICES Award from the Argentine government's Secretariat of Innovation, Science, and Technology

== Selected publications ==
- Lousto, Carlos O. (2000-06-05). "Pragmatic Approach to Gravitational Radiation Reaction in Binary Black Holes". Physical Review Letters. 84 (23): 5251–5254. arXiv:gr-qc/9912017. Bibcode:2000PhRvL..84.5251L. doi:10.1103/physrevlett.84.5251. PMID 10990916.
- Campanelli, M.; Lousto, C. O.; Marronetti, P.; Zlochower, Y. (2006-03-22). "Accurate Evolutions of Orbiting Black-Hole Binaries without Excision". Physical Review Letters. 96 (11) 111101. arXiv:gr-qc/0511048. Bibcode:2006PhRvL..96k1101C. doi:10.1103/physrevlett.96.111101. PMID 16605808.
- Campanelli, Manuela; Lousto, Carlos O.; Zlochower, Yosef; Merritt, David (2007-06-07). "Maximum Gravitational Recoil". Physical Review Letters. 98 (23) 231102. arXiv:gr-qc/0702133. Bibcode:2007PhRvL..98w1102C. doi:10.1103/physrevlett.98.231102. PMID 17677894.
- Lousto, Carlos O.; Zlochower, Yosef (2011-01-24). "Orbital Evolution of Extreme-Mass-Ratio Black-Hole Binaries with Numerical Relativity". Physical Review Letters. 106 (4) 041101. arXiv:1009.0292. Bibcode:2011PhRvL.106d1101L. doi:10.1103/physrevlett.106.041101. PMID 21405317.
- Lousto, Carlos O.; Healy, James (2015-04-06). "Flip-Flopping Binary Black Holes". Physical Review Letters. 114 (14) 141101. arXiv:1410.3830. Bibcode:2015PhRvL.114n1101L. doi:10.1103/physrevlett.114.141101. PMID 25910104.
