= Laura A. Lopez =

American astronomer

- Education: Massachusetts Institute of Technology, University of California Santa Cruz Ph.D.
- Scientific career
- Fields: Astrophysics
- Workplaces: Ohio State University
- Thesis: The tumultuous lives and deaths of stars (2011)
- Doctoral advisor: Enrico Ramirez-Ruiz, Mark R. Krumholz

Laura A. Lopez is a full professor of astronomy at The Ohio State University. She is a multiwavelength observer who is broadly interested in topics related to stellar feedback, supernovae (SNe), galactic winds, and the interstellar medium (ISM) in galaxies. Prof. Lopez aims to bridge the gap between observations and theory by developing meaningful ways to compare theoretical predictions to observational results. Prof. Lopez uses observational facilities which cover the entire electromagnetic spectrum - radio, mm, infrared, optical, X-ray, and gamma-ray - to have a complete view of the relevant processes in galaxies and the ISM. In addition to her research, Prof. Lopez is also deeply committed to enhancing the participation and retention of students in the sciences.

Prof. Lopez was awarded the Annie Jump Cannon Award of the American Astronomical Society in 2016, a Cottrell Scholar Award in 2019, the AAS High-Energy Astrophysics Division Early Career Prize in 2022, the OSU College of Arts & Sciences Diversity Enhancement Faculty Award in 2022, and the OSU College of Arts & Sciences Mid-Career Faculty Excellence Award in 2025.

== Early life and education ==
Lopez grew up in Barrington, Illinois, and graduated from Barrington High School in 2000. Lopez received her undergraduate degree from Massachusetts Institute of Technology in 2004. Lopez earned her PhD in astronomy and astrophysics from the University of California Santa Cruz in 2011. After completing her PhD she was an Einstein Fellow and Pappalardo Fellow in Physics at Massachusetts Institute of Technology (2011–2014). Following that, she was a Hubble Fellow at the Center for Astrophysics | Harvard & Smithsonian (2014–2015).

== Career ==
Lopez has contributed to the field of the life cycle of stars. She has used the NuSTAR X-ray satellite to study Tycho's Supernova remnant. Using optical, infrared, radio, and X-ray images, she measured the pressures exerted on the remnant shells from direct stellar radiation, dust-processed radiation, warm ionized gas, and hot X-ray-emitting gas.

Lopez has used data acquired from various observatories to show that Supernova Remnant (SNR) 0104–72.3 in the Small Magellanic Cloud arose from a jet-driven bipolar core-collapse supernova.

Using the Advanced CCD Imaging Spectrometer on board the Chandra X-ray Observatory, Lopez observed the Galactic supernova remnant (SNR) W49B to understand the thermodynamic properties and explosive origin of the SNR. The observed electron temperature and absorbing column toward W49B suggest that the mean metal abundances are consistent with the predicted yields in models of bipolar/jet-driven core-collapse SNe. W49B is thus likely a bipolar Type Ib/Ic SN, making it the first of its kind to be discovered in the Milky Way.

Lopez is interested in diversity in astronomy and is an advocate of the LGBTQ astronomical community. Additionally, she has previously served on the AAS Committee on the Status of Minorities in Astronomy (CSMA).

== Awards ==
- 2026 – Edward A. Bouchet Award by the American Physical Society, "for pioneering contributions to X-ray astronomy, including foundational studies of supernova remnants, compact objects, and stellar feedback in galaxies, and for transformative leadership in advancing equity and inclusion in physics through innovative mentorship programs, national advocacy, and unwavering support for students from historically marginalized communities."
- 2025 – Nancy Grace Roman Award of the Astronomical Society of the Pacific
- 2025 – Fellow of the American Astronomical Society, "for outstanding research contributions in the multiwavelength study of supernovae, compact objects, star formation, the interstellar medium, and galaxy evolution; for extensive contributions in advancing equity and inclusion in astronomy and physics through transformative mentorship programs; and for nearly 20 years of national leadership in the AAS".
- 2019-2022 – Cottrell Scholar Award by Research Corporation for Science Advancement
- 2016 – Annie Jump Cannon Award by American Astronomical Society

== Selected publications ==
- Pandey, Paarmita; Lopez, Laura A.; Rosen, Anna L.; Thompson, Todd A.; Linden, Tim; Blackstone, Ian (2024-11-01). "Constraining the Diffusion Coefficient and Cosmic-Ray Acceleration Efficiency Using Gamma-Ray Emission from the Star-forming Region RCW 38". The Astrophysical Journal. 976 (1): 98. arXiv:2404.19001. Bibcode:2024ApJ...976...98P. doi:10.3847/1538-4357/ad83bc. ISSN 0004-637X.
- Webb, Trinity L.; Rodriguez, Jennifer A.; Lopez, Laura A.; Rosen, Anna L.; Lancaster, Lachlan; Nayak, Omnarayani; McLeod, Anna F.; Pandey, Paarmita; Olivier, Grace M. (2024-12-01). "Detection of Diffuse Hot Gas around the Young, Potential Superstar Cluster H72.97–69.39". The Astrophysical Journal. 977 (1): 45. arXiv:2402.14056. Bibcode:2024ApJ...977...45W. doi:10.3847/1538-4357/ad8c41. ISSN 0004-637X.
- Porraz Barrera, Natalia; Lopez, Sebastian; Lopez, Laura A.; Foord, Adi; Nguyen, Dustin D.; Thompson, Todd A.; Mathur, Smita; Bolatto, Alberto D. (2024-06-01). "Hot Gas Outflow Properties of the Starburst Galaxy NGC 4945". The Astrophysical Journal. 968 (2): 54. arXiv:2312.08444. Bibcode:2024ApJ...968...54P. doi:10.3847/1538-4357/ad4606. ISSN 0004-637X.
- Pathak, Debosmita; Leroy, Adam K.; Thompson, Todd A.; Lopez, Laura A.; Belfiore, Francesco; Boquien, Médéric; Dale, Daniel A.; Glover, Simon C. O.; Klessen, Ralf S.; Koch, Eric W.; Rosolowsky, Erik; Sandstrom, Karin M.; Schinnerer, Eva; Smith, Rowan; Sun, Jiayi (2024-01-01). "A Two-Component Probability Distribution Function Describes the Mid-IR Emission from the Disks of Star-forming Galaxies". The Astronomical Journal. 167 (1): 39. arXiv:2311.18067. Bibcode:2024AJ....167...39P. doi:10.3847/1538-3881/ad110d. ISSN 0004-6256.
- Mayker Chen, Ness; Leroy, Adam K.; Lopez, Laura A.; Benincasa, Samantha; Chevance, Mélanie; Glover, Simon C. O.; Hughes, Annie; Kreckel, Kathryn; Sarbadhicary, Sumit; Sun 孙, Jiayi 嘉懿; Thompson, Todd A.; Utomo, Dyas; Bigiel, Frank; Blanc, Guillermo A.; Dale, Daniel A. (2023-02-01). "Comparing the Locations of Supernovae to CO (2–1) Emission in Their Host Galaxies". The Astrophysical Journal. 944 (1): 110. arXiv:2212.09766. Bibcode:2023ApJ...944..110M. doi:10.3847/1538-4357/acab00. ISSN 0004-637X.
- Lopez, Sebastian; Lopez, Laura A.; Nguyen, Dustin D.; Thompson, Todd A.; Mathur, Smita; Bolatto, Alberto D.; Vulic, Neven; Sardone, Amy (2023-01-01). "X-Ray Properties of NGC 253's Starburst-driven Outflow". The Astrophysical Journal. 942 (2): 108. arXiv:2209.09260. Bibcode:2023ApJ...942..108L. doi:10.3847/1538-4357/aca65e. ISSN 0004-637X.
- Olivier, Grace M.; Lopez, Laura A.; Rosen, Anna L.; Nayak, Omnarayani; Reiter, Megan; Krumholz, Mark R.; Bolatto, Alberto D. (2021-02-01). "Evolution of Stellar Feedback in H II Regions". The Astrophysical Journal. 908 (1): 68. arXiv:2009.10079. Bibcode:2021ApJ...908...68O. doi:10.3847/1538-4357/abd24a. ISSN 0004-637X.
- Lopez, Laura A.; Mathur, Smita; Nguyen, Dustin D.; Thompson, Todd A.; Olivier, Grace M. (2020-12-01). "Temperature and Metallicity Gradients in the Hot Gas Outflows of M82". The Astrophysical Journal. 904 (2): 152. arXiv:2006.08623. Bibcode:2020ApJ...904..152L. doi:10.3847/1538-4357/abc010. ISSN 0004-637X.
- Lopez, Laura A.; Auchettl, Katie; Linden, Tim; Bolatto, Alberto D.; Thompson, Todd A.; Ramirez-Ruiz, Enrico (2018-11-01). "Evidence for Cosmic-Ray Escape in the Small Magellanic Cloud Using Fermi Gamma Rays". The Astrophysical Journal. 867 (1): 44. arXiv:1807.06595. Bibcode:2018ApJ...867...44L. doi:10.3847/1538-4357/aae0f8. ISSN 0004-637X.
- Holland-Ashford, Tyler; Lopez, Laura A.; Auchettl, Katie; Temim, Tea; Ramirez-Ruiz, Enrico (2017-07-20). "Comparing Neutron Star Kicks to Supernova Remnant Asymmetries". The Astrophysical Journal. 844 (1): 84. arXiv:1705.08454. Bibcode:2017ApJ...844...84H. doi:10.3847/1538-4357/aa7a5c. ISSN 0004-637X.
- Lopez, Laura A.; Krumholz, Mark R.; Bolatto, Alberto D.; Prochaska, J. Xavier; Ramirez-Ruiz, Enrico; Castro, Daniel (2014-10-21). "The Role of Stellar Feedback in the Dynamics of H Ii Regions". The Astrophysical Journal. 795 (2): 121. arXiv:1309.5421. Bibcode:2014ApJ...795..121L. doi:10.1088/0004-637X/795/2/121. ISSN 1538-4357.
- Rosen, Anna L.; Lopez, Laura A.; Krumholz, Mark R.; Ramirez-Ruiz, Enrico (2014-08-11). "Gone with the wind: Where is the missing stellar wind energy from massive star clusters?". Monthly Notices of the Royal Astronomical Society. 442 (3): 2701–2716. arXiv:1405.1427. doi:10.1093/mnras/stu1037. ISSN 1365-2966.
- Lopez, Laura A.; Ramirez-Ruiz, Enrico; Castro, Daniel; Pearson, Sarah (2013-01-24). "The Galactic Supernova Remnant W49B Likely Originates from a Jet-Driven, Core-Collapse Explosion". The Astrophysical Journal. 764 (1): 50. arXiv:1301.0618. Bibcode:2013ApJ...764...50L. doi:10.1088/0004-637X/764/1/50. ISSN 0004-637X.
- Lopez, Laura A.; Ramirez-Ruiz, Enrico; Huppenkothen, Daniela; Badenes, Carles; Pooley, David A. (2011-05-10). "Using the X-Ray Morphology of Young Supernova Remnants to Constrain Explosion Type, Ejecta Distribution, and Chemical Mixing". The Astrophysical Journal. 732 (2): 114. arXiv:1011.0731. Bibcode:2011ApJ...732..114L. doi:10.1088/0004-637X/732/2/114. ISSN 0004-637X.
- Lopez, Laura A.; Krumholz, Mark R.; Bolatto, Alberto D.; Prochaska, J. Xavier; Ramirez-Ruiz, Enrico (2011-04-20). "What Drives the Expansion of Giant H II Regions?: A Study of Stellar Feedback in 30 Doradus". The Astrophysical Journal. 731 (2): 91. arXiv:1008.2383. Bibcode:2011ApJ...731...91L. doi:10.1088/0004-637X/731/2/91. ISSN 0004-637X.
