= Miguel José Yacamán =

Mexican physicist (born 1946)

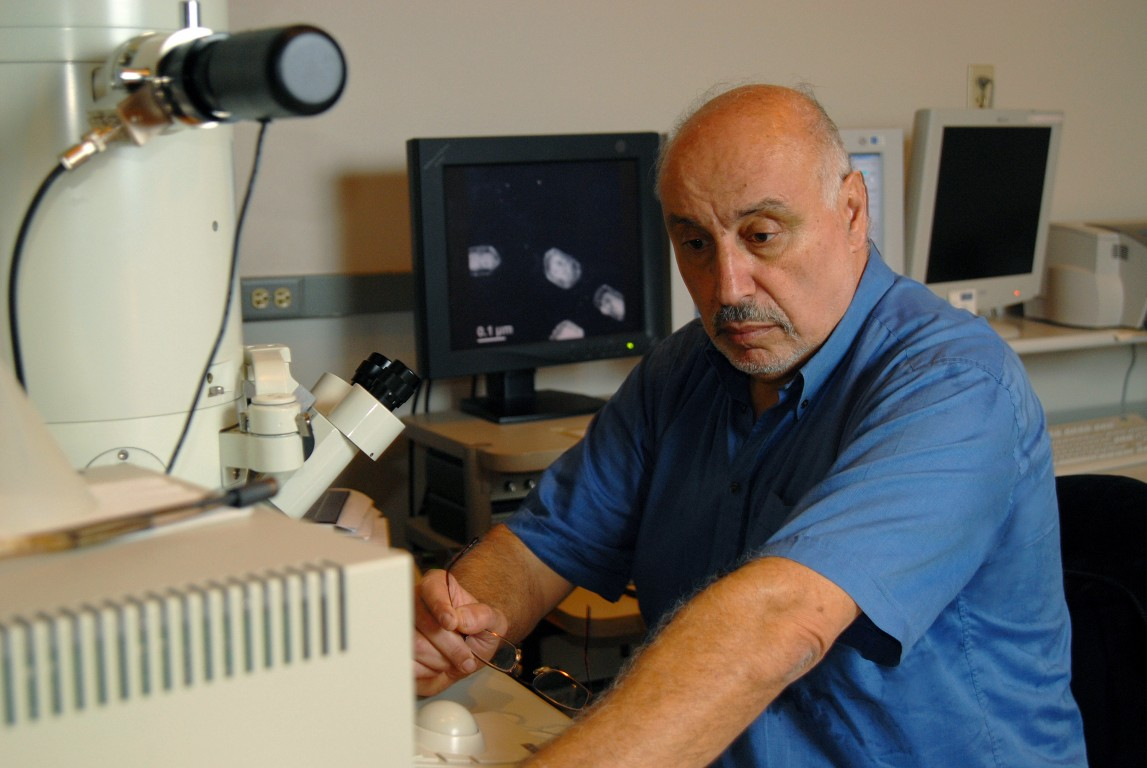
- Born: August 17, 1946 (age 80); Córdoba, Veracruz, Mexico
- Education: National Autonomous University of Mexico
- Scientific career
- Fields: Materials science, nanotechnology, physics
- Workplaces: University of Oxford; NASA Ames Research Center; University of Texas at Austin; University of Texas at San Antonio; Northern Arizona University

Miguel José Yacamán (born August 17, 1946) in Córdoba Veracruz, is a Mexican physicist who has made contributions to the fields of materials science, nanotechnology,and physics.

His research has focused on the correlation of structure and properties in nanomaterials and he has developed electron microscopy methods to study nanoparticles and 2-D materials. The present focuses of his work are to develop the nanoscale equivalent of high entropy alloys and new catalysts to produce cleaner fuels.

He earned his Ph.D. in Physics in 1972 from the National Autonomous University of Mexico and did his postdoctoral materials science studies at the University of Oxford. He was also a Postdoctoral Fellow at the NASA Ames Research Center in Mountain View, California from 1978 to 1979.

Yacamán became the director of the Institute of Physics in 1983–1991. He was the Reese Endowed Professor in Engineering at the University of Texas at Austin from 2001 to 2008. In 2008, he joined The University of Texas at San Antonio (UTSA) to chair the Department of Physics and Astronomy in the College of Sciences until 2018.

As of early 2025, he is a professor of applied physics and materials science and a faculty member of the Center for Materials Interfaces in Research and Applications (¡MIRA!) at Northern Arizona University.

== Research ==
Yacamán has done research on the structure and properties of nanoparticles including metals, semiconductors, and magnetic materials. He has worked on synthesis and characterization of new materials (mainly nanoparticles), surfaces and interfaces, defects in solids, electron diffraction and imaging theory, quasicrystals, archaeological materials, catalysis, and physics and chemistry of asphaltenes. Furthermore, Yacamán has published a research paper, along with other notable scientists, regarding the replacement of reverse transcription polymerase chain reaction (RT-PCR) with Surface Enhanced Raman Spectroscopy (SERS) to test the detection of the Covid-19 virus.

Yacamán is the author of 9 books and over 550 technical papers with over 32,000 total citations. His work in nanoparticles opened a new era in electron microscopy of finite size. He has acted as associate editor of journals such as Acta and Scripta Metallurgica, Catalysis Letters, Journal of Nanostructured Materials, Microscopy Research, and Techniques and Materials Chemistry.

In June 2005, in collaboration with Jose Luis Elechiguerra (Fulbright Fellow), he published a groundbreaking paper on the inhibitory properties of silver nanoparticles against HIV-1. The paper found that silver nanoparticles that had a measurement of 1-10 nanometers attached to the virus, inhibiting its ability to bind to host cells. (Journal of Nanobiotechnology)

== Honors and distinctions ==
Yacamán has held the Guggenheim Fellowship, and was awarded numerous prizes such as the National Prize of Sciences of Mexico and the Prize of the National Academy of Mexico in Exact Sciences. He is a member of the Mexican National Research System (level III), and in May 2003 he was appointed National Researcher of Excellence by CONACyT.

On March 9th, 2018, Yacamán was presented with the Edward A. Bouchet Award by the American Physical Society(APS). According to the APS, Yacamán was chosen for the award “for [his] far-ranging, high-impact contributions to nanoscale science using electron microscopy, and for his mentorship and promotion of Latinos in physics, ranging from undergraduates to faculty."

Yacamán has also made many contributions to Mexican science as Science Director of CONACyT (National Council of Science and Technology) during the nineties establishing many new programs that changed Mexican science.

- Regent Professor at Northern Arizona University (2021)
- Doctorate honoris causa Universidad Nacional de Córdoba (2012)
- Distinguished Scientist SACNAS (2012)
- John Wheatley Award of the American Physical Society (2011)
- Doctorate honoris causa Universidad Autonoma de Nuevo León (2010)
- Investigador Nacional de Excelencia CONACyT (2002)
- Robert Franklin Melh Award and Distinguish lecture, The Metals and Materials Society USA (1997)
- National Prize of Sciences in Mexico (1992)
- Prize in Exact Sciences of the State of Mexico (1987)
- National Prize in Exact Sciences of the Mexican Academy of Sciences (1982)
