= Stuart Yuspa =

American physician

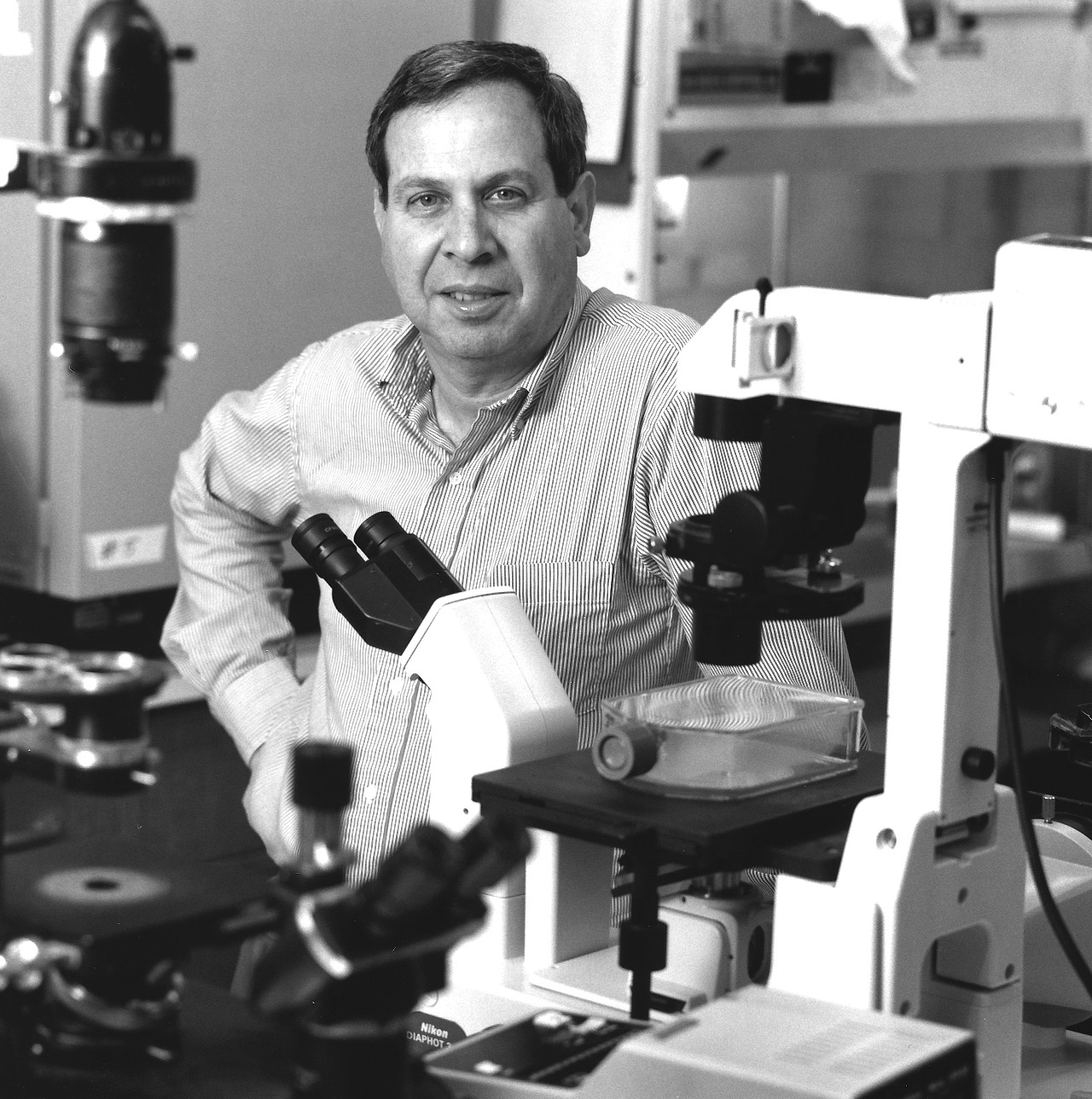
- Scientific career
- Fields: Biology

Stuart H. Yuspa is an American physician-biologist and an Elected Fellow of American Association for the Advancement of Science.
