= Elizabeth A. Craig =

American biochemist

- Education: University of Rhode Island; Washington University in St. Louis
- Known for: Molecular chaperones
- Scientific career
- Fields: Biochemistry
- Workplaces: University of Wisconsin-Madison

Elizabeth A. Craig is a Steenbock Professor of Microbial Science and faculty member in the Biochemistry Department at the University of Wisconsin-Madison. She was elected to the National Academy of Sciences in 1998. Research in her laboratory concentrates on the folding and remodeling of proteins in the cell via molecular chaperones.

== Education ==
Craig earned her bachelor's degree from the University of Rhode Island and her Ph.D. from the Washington University School of Medicine in St. Louis, Missouri in 1972. She got her first postdoc in St. Louis University in virology and her second at UC San Francisco in molecular biology.

== Career ==
Craig joined the faculty at the University of Wisconsin-Madison in 1979. She has a joint appointment in the Biochemistry and Genetics departments.
