= Godfrey Gumbs =

Guyanese scientist

Godfrey Gumbs is a professor of theoretical solid state physics. He is a distinguished professor of physics at Hunter College of the City University of New York (CUNY) and the Maria A. Chianta and Alice M. Stoll Professor of Physics at Hunter College, CUNY.

Gumbs was awarded a Guyana Scholarship to Trinity College, Cambridge University in 1968 and then went on to receive his Ph.D. in theoretical solid state physics (now commonly known as the physics of condensed matter) from the University of Toronto in 1978. From 1978 to 1982, he was a research associate at the National Research Council of Canada in Ottawa. From 1982 to 1989, he was a Natural Sciences and Engineering Research Council of Canada University research fellow, serving as both assistant and associate professor.

Gumbs has taught at Hunter College and the CUNY Graduate Center since 1992. His research focuses primarily on nanophysics, especially the way in which the particles carrying the charge behave in very small confined spaces. Among several others, his interests include strongly interacting particles in semiconductors, graphene sheets, carbon nanotubes, graphene nanoribbons, as well as ways of isolating and transporting single electrons. Device applications of this work include photon detectors and sources, as well as quantum information processing. He has published extensively on these topics in scientific journals. He has shown that the properties of quasicrystals depend critically on the way in which their quasi-periodicity is arranged. He is a research fellow of the American Physical Society (APS), fellow of the Institute of Physics(F InstP), a Chartered Physicist (CPhys) both of the UK, a fellow of the New York Academy of Sciences, a visiting fellow of Trinity College, Cambridge University in 2007–2008 and a Kavli Institute of Theoretical Physics Scholar at the University of California, Santa Barbara. He has been honored by the APS with the Edward A. Bouchet Award in 2005, for his significant contributions to physics and his mentoring of students. He was an Alexander von Humboldt Fellow in 1990 and a J. William Fulbright Senior Scholar in 2005.
