= Arnaldo Díaz Vázquez =

Latino chemist and education administrator

Arnaldo Díaz Vázquez is a Ph.D. trained scientist and higher education administrator who is known for mentoring students in STEM born in Puerto Rico.

== Education ==
Díaz Vázquez, who is from Arroyo, Puerto Rico, earned his Bachelor of Science in Chemistry from the University of Puerto Rico at Río Piedras before completing his Ph.D. in biochemistry at Texas A&M University and his postdoctoral work at the University of Pennsylvania.

== Career ==
In 2021, Díaz joined UT Southwestern Graduate School of Biomedical Sciences as an Assistant Dean.

Diaz oversees research and education training programs at UT Southwestern. Some of these programs include the UTSW's Summer Undergraduate Research Fellowship (SURF) program, the Amgen Scholars Program, and the UTSW Post-baccalaureate to Ph.D. (PB2PHD) program.

Díaz was previously affiliated with the department of systems pharmacology and translational therapeutics at the Perelman School of Medicine at the University of Pennsylvania as an adjunct assistant professor of pharmacology and director of the Summer Undergraduate Internship Program (SUIP), and assistant dean for research training programs.

== Awards ==
Diaz was named the 2022 Society for Advancement of Chicanos/Hispanics and Native Americans in Science (SACNAS) Distinguished Mentor.

In 2020 Diaz was named among most inspiring Hispanic/Latino scientists in America by Cell Press, a publisher of biomedical journals.
