= Gene Shearer =

American immunologist

Personal details
- Born: April 14, 1937 (age 88) Monticello, Kentucky
- Occupation: immunologist

Gene Martin Shearer (born April 14, 1937) is an American immunologist who works at the National Institutes of Health (NIH). He first achieved fame for his discovery in 1974 that T lymphocytes recognized chemically modified surface antigens only in the context of self major histocompatibility complex (MHC) encoded molecules, identifying the central feature of antigen recognition by T lymphocytes known as MHC restriction. His discovery of MHC restriction using chemically modified surface antigens was simultaneous with the discovery of MHC restricted T lymphocyte recognition of virus infected cells by Rolf Zinkernagel and Peter Doherty, who received the 1996 Nobel Prize in Physiology or Medicine.

When the acquired immune deficiency syndrome (AIDS) epidemic was first identified, Shearer realized that the immune deficiencies occurring in AIDS patients closely resembled the immune deficiencies occurring in experimental murine models of graft versus host disease that he had been studying. Consequently, in 1983 Shearer was one of the first immunologists to begin studying the immune dysregulation in AIDS patients and discovered that infection with human immunodeficiency virus (HIV) resulted in CD4+ T cell dysfunction and immune dysregulation long before the onset of overt clinical disease. At the height of the AIDS epidemic when public concern about HIV exposure was at its peak, Shearer's research revealed that T cell immunity to HIV was protective, providing hope to an increasingly concerned public that HIV infection could be contained.

== Biography ==
Shearer was born and raised in Monticello in rural Kentucky. In 1961, he earned a B.Sc. degree in biology at Western Kentucky State College and, in 1967, earned a Ph.D. in Radiation Biology from the University of Tennessee Knoxville in the laboratory of Gustavo Cudkowicz with whom he studied lymphoid stem cells. After a post-doctoral fellowship examining genetic regulation of immune responses to synthetic protein antigens with Michael Sela at the Weizmann Institute of Science in Rehovot, Israel, Shearer started his own laboratory in 1972 at the National Cancer Institute, a part of the National Institutes of Health in Bethesda, MD. Shearer published nearly 500 research papers in both basic and clinical immunology from his laboratory and trained over 50 postdoctoral fellows and students before retiring in 2014 at age 77 from the National Cancer Institute's Experimental Immunology Branch of which he was a founding member.

Shearer lives in Bethesda, MD. He married Minetta Stone in 1966; they have two sons. Shearer's interests include cycling and playing autoharp and harmonica with his musical group, the Half-Right Band.

== Awards ==
- Senior Weizmann Research Fellowship, 1971
- NIH Director's Award, 1978
- Senior Executive Service Awards, 1986, 1988, 1991, 1992, 1996
- NIH Technology Transfer Award, 1993
- Western Kentucky University Distinguished Alumnus, 1999
- Honored Speaker at the "1999 Evening of Hope", sponsored by Project Inform
- Wayne County High School Alumni Hall of Fame for contributions in the field of science, 2003
- Norman P. Salzman Memorial Mentor Award in Virology, 2005
- Norman P. Salzman Memorial Mentor Award in Virology, 2007
- American Society for Microbiology Abbott Laboratories Award in Clinical & Diagnostic Immunology, 2010

== Highly cited publications ==
- Clerici M and Shearer GM: A TH1 TH2 switch is a critical step in the etiology of HIV infection. Immunology Today 14:107 111, 1993.
- Bourne HR, Lichtenstein LM, Melmon RL, Henny CS, Weinstein Y, and Shearer GM. Modulation of inflammation and immunity by cyclic AMP. Science 184: 19 28, 1974.
- Shearer GM. Cell mediated cytotoxicity to trinitrophenyl modified syngeneic lymphocytes. Eur J Immunol 4: 527 533, 1974.
- Clerici M, Stocks NI, Zajac RA, Boswell RN, Lucey DR, Via CS and Shearer GM. Detection of three distinct patterns of T helper cell dysfunction in asymptomatic, HIV seropositive patients: Independence of CD4+ cell numbers and clinical staging. J Clin Invest 84: 1892 1899, 1989.
- Clerici M and Shearer GM: The Th1/Th2 hypothesis of HIV infection: new insights. Immunology Today 15:575-581, 1994.
- Keissling R, Hochman PS, Haller O, Shearer GM, Wigzell H and Cudkowicz G. Evidence for a similar or common mechanism for natural killer cell activity and resistance to hemopoietic grafts. Eur J Immunol 7: 655 663, 1977.
- Shearer GM, Rehn TG and Garbarino CA. Cell mediated lympholysis to trinitrophenyl modified autologous lymphocytes: Effector cell specificity to modified cell surface components controlled by the H 2K and H 2D serological regions of the murine major histocompatibility complex. J Exp Med 141: 1348 1364, 1975.
- Clerici M, Hakim FT, Venzon DJ, Blatt S, Hendrix CW, Wynn TA and Shearer GM: Changes in interleukin-2 and interleukin-4 production in asymptomatic, human immunodeficiency virus seropositive individuals. J Clin Invest 91:759 765, 1993.
- Lucey DR, Clerici M, Shearer GM. Type 1 and type 2 cytokine dysregulation in human infectious, neoplastic and inflammatory diseases. Clin Microbiol Rev 9:532-562, 1996.
- Sher, A., Gazzinelli, R.T., Oswald, I. Clerici, M., Kullberg, M., Pearce, E.J., Berzofsky, J.A., Mosmann, T.R., James, S.L., Morse, H.C. and Shearer, G.M.: Role of T cell derived cytokines in the down regulation of immune responses in parasitic and retroviral infection. Immunol Revs 127:183 204, 1992.
- Clerici, M., Giorgi, J. V., Gudeman, V. K., Chou, C. C., Zack, J. A., Nishanian, P. G., Dudley, J. P., Berzofsky, J. A. and Shearer, G. M.: Specific T helper cell immunity to HIV 1 envelope peptides in seronegative individuals with recent exposure to HIV 1. J Infect Dis, 165:1012 1019, 1992.
- Clerici M, Lucey DR, Berzofsky JA, Pinto LA, Wynn TA, Blatt SP, Dolan MJ, Hendrix CW, Wolf SF and Shearer GM: Restoration of HIV specific cell mediated immune responses by interleukin 12 in vitro. Science 262:1721 1724, 1993.
- Shaw S, Johnson AH and Shearer GM. Evidence for a new segregant series of B cell antigens which are encoded in the HLA D region and stimulate secondary allogeneic proliferative and cytotoxic responses. J Exp Med 152: 565 580, 1980.
- Clerici M, Wynn TA, Berzofsky JA, Blatt SP, Hendrix CW, Sher A., Coffman RL and Shearer GM: Role of interleukin 10 (IL 10) in T helper cell dysfunction in asymptomatic individuals infected with the human immunodeficiency virus (HIV 1). J Clin Invest 93:768 775, 1994.
- Shearer GM, Bernstein DC, Tung KSK, Via CS, Redfield R, Salahuddin SZ and Gallo RC. A model for the selective loss of major histocompatibility complex self restricted T cell immune responses during the development of acquired immune deficiency syndrome (AIDS). J Immunol 137:2514 2521, 1986.
- Clerici M, Stocks NI, Zajac RA, Boswell RN, Bernstein DC, Mann DL, Shearer GM and Berzofsky JA. Antigenic peptides recognized by T helper lymphocytes from asymptomatic, HIV seropositive individuals. Nature 339: 383 385, 1989.
- Clerici M, Sarin A, Coffman RL, Wynn TA, Blatt SP, Hendrix CW, Wolf SF, Shearer GM and Henkart PA.: Type 1/Type 2 cytokine modulation of T cell programmed cell death as a model for HIV pathogenesis. Proc Natl Acad Sci USA 91:11811-11815, 1994.
- Shearer GM, Rehn TG and Schmitt Verhulst A M. Role of the murine major histocompatibility complex in the induction of cell mediated lympholysis to chemically modified autologous lymphocytes. Transplant Rev 29: 22 248, 1976.
- Pinto LA, Sullivan J, Berzofsky JA, Clerici M, Kessler HA, Landay AL, Shearer GM. Env-specific cytotoxic T lymphocyte responses in HIV seronegative healthcare workers occupationally exposed to HIV-contaminated body fluids. J Clin Invest 96:867-873, 1995.
- Salk J, Bretscher P, Salk PL, Clerici M and Shearer GM: A strategy for prophylactic vaccination against HIV. Science 260:1270 1272, 1993.
- Clerici M, Lucey DR, Zajac RA, Boswell RN, Gebel HM, Takahashi H, Berzofsky JA and Shearer GM. Detection of cytotoxic T lymphocytes specific for synthetic peptides of gp160 in HIV seropositive individuals. J Immunol 146; 2214 2219, 1991.
- Clerici M, Levin JM, Kessler HA, Harris, Berzofsky JA, Landay AL and Shearer GM: HIV specific T helper activity in seronegative health care workers exposed to contaminated blood. JAMA 271:42 46, 1994.
- Via CS, Sharrow SO and Shearer GM. Role of cytotoxic T lymphocytes in the prevention of lupus like disease occurring in a murine model of graft vs host disease. J Immunol 139: 1840 1849, 1987.
- Shearer GM, Clerici M. Protective immunity against HIV infection: has nature done the experiment for us? Immunology Today 17:21-4, 1996.
- Shearer GM and Clerici M: Early T helper cell defects in HIV infection. AIDS 5: 245 253, 1991.
- Via CS and Shearer GM. T cell interactions in autoimmunity: Insights from a murine model of graft versus host disease. Immunol Today 9: 207 213, 1988.
- Shearer GM and Schmitt Verhulst A M. Major histocompatibility complex restricted cell mediated immunity. Adv Immunol 25: 55 92, 1978.
- Herbeuval JP, Shearer GM. HIV-1 immunopathogenesis: How good interferon turns bad. Clin Immunol. 2007; 123:121-128.
- Dolan MJ, Clerici M, Blatt SP, Hendrix CW, Melcher GP, Boswell RN, Shearer GM. A functional and phenotypic assessment of T helper cells in HIV 1 infected patients offers independent prognostic information for survival. J Infect Dis; 172:79-87, 1995.
- Chougnet C, Wynn TA, Clerici M, Landay A, Kessler H, Rusnak J, Melchers GP, Sher A, Shearer GM. Molecular analysis of decreased IL-12 production in persons infected with human immunodeficiency virus. J Infect Dis 174:46-53, 1996.
- Biddison WE, Sharrow SO and Shearer GM. T cell subpopulations required for the human cytotoxic and lymphocyte response to influenza virus: Evidence for T cell help. J Immunol 127: 487 491, 1981.
- Boasso A and Shearer GM. Chronic innate immune activation as a cause of HIV-1 immunopathogenesis. Clin Immunol. 2008; 126: 235–242.
