= Eloy Rodriguez =

American biochemist (born 1947)

- Born: January 7, 1947 (age 79); Edinburg, Texas, U.S.
- Occupation: James Perkins Professor of Environmental Studies at Cornell University

Academic background
- Education: University of Texas at Austin (B.S., 1969; Ph.D., 1975)

Academic work
- Discipline: Biochemist

Eloy Rodriguez (born January 7, 1947) is an American biochemist. He is the James Perkins Professor of Environmental Studies at Cornell University. He was born in Edinburg, Texas. His interest in medicine began with visits from the curanderos while sick.

Collaborating with primatologist Richard Wrangham, Rodriguez introduced the concept of zoopharmacognosy.

Rodriguez graduated from the University of Texas at Austin with a B.S. in 1969 and a Ph.D. in phytochemistry and plant biology in 1975. Later, at the University of British Columbia, he received medical postdoctoral training in medicinal botany. He was an assistant professor of ecology and evolutionary biology at the University of California, Irvine from 1976 to 1994 before joining the faculty at Cornell.

Rodriguez contributed to the establishment of the disciplines of zoopharmacognosy, and chemo-ornithology, which explores the chemical ecology of bird-insect-plant interactions.

Rodriguez has mentored and trained hundreds of underrepresented minority and majority students in the sciences at Cornell University and the University of California, Irvine, many of whom have gone on to careers in medicine, research, and environmental sciences.

== Other interests ==
Rodriguez, who is Mexican-American, also serves as a faculty advisor for the Science Organization of Latinos at Cornell. Cornell University currently has an award named after him called the "Diversity, Equity, and Inclusion Conference Travel Award".

Rodriguez is the director of the Cornell University Esbaran Amazon Field Laboratory located in the Amazon rainforest near Iquitos, Peru.

Rodriguez is the founder of the California Alliance for Minority Participation (CAMP) program funded by the National Science Foundation. As a result, the CAMP program spread from its home campus, University of California, Irvine, to the 9 other branches of the University of California.
