= Ortiz, Colorado =

Unincorporated community in Conejos County, CO, USA

Coordinates: 37°00′15″N 106°02′39″W

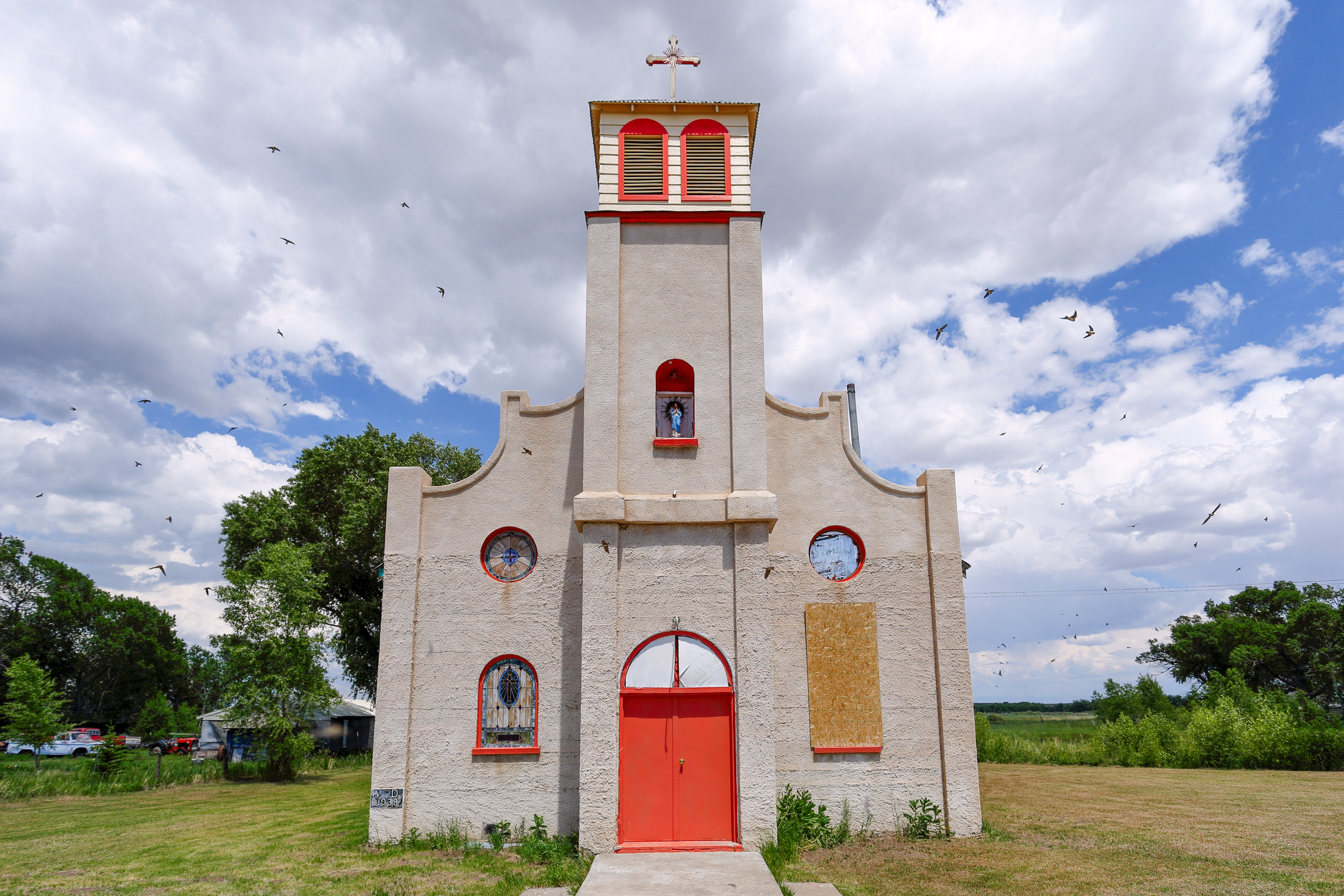
The Catholic Church in Ortiz

Ortiz is an unincorporated community in Conejos County, in the U.S. state of Colorado. Until 1885 or 1890 (accounts differ) Ortiz was called "Los Piños".

== History ==
After 1868 sheep and wool became the main economic activities in the region and Ortiz began to develop. The construction of the Denver & Rio Grande Railway stimulated the economy and the population grew after 1880. A public school and Baptist and Presbyterian mission schools opened at various times in Ortiz as well as bars and two stores. A first Catholic church was constructed in 1895, and in 1938 it was replaced by the church that still exists.

A post office called Ortiz was established in 1890, and remained in operation until 1943. The original proprietor, J. Nestor Ortiz, gave the community his name. When the sheep industry dwindled in the first decades of the 20th century, Ortiz started to decline and today the church building that was repaired and restored in 1990 is all that reminds of the old glory.

== Population ==
In 2020, an Amish family settled near Ortiz, just South of the border between Colorado and New Mexico . They were joined by several other Amish families in 2021 and 2022 and formed a new Amish settlement, the first in New Mexico. This settlement is named after Ortiz even though it is in New Mexico because there is no nearby settlement in New Mexico.
