= Enrico Ramirez-Ruiz =

Gravitational wave researcher

Enrico Ramirez-Ruiz is a professor of astronomy and astrophysics at the University of California, Santa Cruz.

== Early life and education ==
Ramirez-Ruiz was born and raised in Mexico City. Ramirez-Ruiz completed his undergraduate studies in physics at the Universidad Nacional Autónoma de México. He completed his doctoral studies at the University of Cambridge.

== Career ==
Ramirez-Ruiz holds the Vera Rubin Presidential Chair in Physics and Astronomy at the University of California, Santa Cruz. He was a NASA Chandra and Bahcall Fellow at the Institute for Advanced Study. He was inducted to the American Academy of Arts and Sciences in 2020 and the Mexican Academy of Sciences in 2010. In 2019, he received the HEAD Mid-Career Prize from the American Astronomical Society. In 2021, he was awarded the Dwight Nicholson Medal for Outreach by the American Physical Society. Ramirez-Ruiz is also the Niels Bohr professor at University of Copenhagen.

Ramirez-Ruiz founded the Lamat Institute at the University of California, Santa Cruz in 2009. In February 2022, Ramirez-Ruiz received the Presidential Award for Excellence in Science, Mathematics and Engineering Mentoring for creating the Lamat Institute.

Ramirez-Ruiz was named president of the board of Astronomical Society of the Pacific in June 2025.

== Selected publications ==
- Kasen, D., Metzger, B., Barnes, J., Quataert, E., and Ramirez-Ruiz, E., "Origin of the heavy elements in binary neutron-star mergers from a gravitational- wave event." Nature, 551(7678):80–84, Oct 2017. doi:10.1038/nature24453
- Guillochon, J. and Ramirez-Ruiz, E., “Hydrodynamical Simulations to Determine the Feeding Rate of Black Holes by the Tidal Disruption of Stars: The Importance of the Impact Parameter and Stellar Structure” The Astrophysical Journal, 767(1):25, Mar 2013. doi:10.1088/0004-637X/767/1/25
- Gehrels, N., Ramirez-Ruiz, E., and Fox, D., "Gamma ray bursts in the iswift/i era. Annual Review of Astronomy and Astrophysics, 47(1): 567–617, Sep 2009. doi: 10.1146/annurev.astro.46.060407.145147 doi:10.1146/annurev.astro.46.060407.145147
- Roberts, L. F., Kasen, D., Lee, W. H., and Ramirez-Ruiz, E., "Electromagnetic Transients Powered by Nuclear Decay in the Tidal Tails of Coalescing Compact Binaries". The Astrophysical Journal, 736(1):L21, Jul 2011. doi:10.1088/2041-8205/736/1/l21
