= List of Jamaicans =

The following is a list of notable people from Jamaica. The list includes some non-resident Jamaicans who were born in Jamaica and also people of predominantly Jamaican heritage.

== Artists ==
- Carl Abrahams, painter
- Hope Brooks, painter
- John Dunkley, painter and sculptor
- Gloria Escoffery, painter and art critic
- Laura Facey, sculptor and installation artist
- Christopher González, painter and sculptor
- Ras Daniel Heartman, artist
- Albert Huie, painter
- George "Fowokan" Kelly, sculptor
- Edna Manley, painter, sculptor and arts educator
- Alvin Marriott, sculptor
- Ronald Moody, sculptor; Moody crater on Mercury was named after him
- Keith Anthony Morrison, painter, printmaker, educator, critic, curator and administrator
- Petrona Morrison, sculptor and media artist
- Ebony Patterson, visual artist and educator
- David Pottinger, painter
- Mallica Reynolds, painter and sculptor
- Margaret Rose Vendryes, multimedia artist
- Barrington Watson, painter
- Basil Watson, painter and sculptor
- Donnette Zacca, fine arts photographer, lecturer, and artist

== Beauty contest winners ==
- Cindy Breakspeare, Miss World 1976
- Carole Joan Crawford, Miss World 1963
- Lisa Hanna, Miss World 1993, politician
- Toni-Ann Singh, Miss World 2019

== Business and law ==
- Alexander Aikman, printer, publisher, and landowner
- Chris Blackwell, president and CEO of Island Records and Palm Pictures, NYC
- Morris Cargill, lawyer and businessman
- G. Raymond Chang, co-founder of CI Financial and the third chancellor of Ryerson University
- Alexandra Chong, founder and CEO of Jacana
- Tanya Chutkan, Jamaican-born American lawyer and jurist, U.S. district court judge for the District of Columbia; overseeing the criminal trial of Donald Trump over his attempts to overturn the 2020 general election including the United States Capitol attack
- Gloria Cumper, barrister, first black woman to study at the University of Cambridge
- Jak Beula Dodd, entrepreneur and inventor of the board game Nubian Jak
- Wilfred Emmanuel-Jones, businessman, farmer and founder of "The Black Farmer" range of food products
- Renatha Francis, circuit judge in Palm Beach County, Florida
- Alfred Constantine Goffe, "the banana king" of Port Maria
- Claudia L. Gordon, lawyer, first deaf black female attorney in the United States
- Marshall Hall, economist, businessman and banker
- Ephraim and Lowell Hawthorne, founders of Golden Krust Caribbean Bakery
- Joey Issa, founder of Cool Group
- Michael Lee-Chin, chairman/CEO of AIC Limited, chairman of NCB Jamaica
- Henry Lowe, owner of a variety of businesses in the health industry
- Val McCalla, accountant and media entrepreneur; the founder of The Voice, a British weekly newspaper aimed at the Britain's black community
- Caroline Newman, entrepreneur and the first black solicitor to be elected to the Council of the Law Society of England and Wales
- Janet Nosworthy, international judge and lawyer
- Philip Ernest Housden Pike, barrister and judge who served as the second Chief Justice of Borneo
- Heather Rabbatts, businesswoman, solicitor and broadcaster; became the youngest council chief in the UK; first ethnic minority person to serve as a Football Association director
- Patrick Lipton Robinson, member of the International Court of Justice
- Tracy Robinson, lawyer and lecturer in the Faculty of Law at the University of the West Indies
- Lascelles Robotham, lawyer and chief justice of the Eastern Caribbean Supreme Court
- Levi Roots, chairman of Reggae Reggae Sauce
- David P. Rowe, lawyer
- Adam Stewart
- Gordon "Butch" Stewart
- George Stiebel, trader and entrepreneur who became Jamaica's first black millionaire
- Tom Tavares-Finson, lawyer
- Gail Vaz-Oxlade, financial adviser, TV personality
- James S. Watson, one of the first Black Americans elected as a judge in the state of New York
- Dame Sharon White, businesswoman and Second Permanent Secretary at HM Treasury 2013–2015; first black person, and the second woman, to become a permanent secretary at the UK HM Treasury
- Damian Williams, first African-American U.S. attorney for the Southern District of New York

== Bands ==
- Black Uhuru, Grammy Award winners
- Bob Marley and the Wailers
- Burning Spear
- Byron Lee and the Dragonaires
- Culture
- Inner Circle
- Morgan Heritage, Grammy Award winners
- The Pioneers
- Skatalites, ska band
- Sly and Robbie
- Third World
- T.O.K., a crew of deejays
- Toots and the Maytals, double Grammy Award winners

== Journalists, poets and writers ==
- Opal Palmer Adisa, writer
- Louisa Wells Aikman, writer
- Gwyneth Barber Wood, poet
- Edward Baugh, poet
- Lindsay Barrett, writer, playwright, journalist
- Louise Bennett-Coverley, poet
- Evon Blake, journalist
- Barbara Blake Hannah, author and journalist; first black on-camera reporter and interviewer on British television
- Jean "Binta" Breeze, poet
- Erna Brodber, novelist
- Lady Colin Campbell, writer, socialite
- Morris Cargill, journalist
- Margaret Cezair-Thompson, novelist
- Colin Channer, novelist, co-founder of Calabash
- Staceyann Chin, poet and writer
- Michelle Cliff, writer
- Aston Cooke, playwright, artistic director
- Carolyn Cooper, writer and cultural theorist
- Christine Craig, poet and short story writer
- Patricia Cumper, playwright
- Kwame Dawes, Ghana-born writer, co-founder of Calabash
- Jean D'Costa, professor, linguist, and children's novelist
- Ferdinand Dennis, writer, broadcaster, journalist and lecturer
- Nicole Dennis-Benn, novelist
- John Figueroa, poet
- Ryan Fraser, writer
- Thomas Glave, Bronx-born writer
- Lorna Goodison, writer
- Hubert Henry Harrison, writer, philosopher
- Victor Headley, author
- John Hearne, journalist, novelist
- Perry Henzell, writer, director
- Marlon James, novelist
- Vere Johns, writer, broadcaster, actor
- Linton Kwesi Johnson, dub poet
- Evan Jones, writer
- Roger Mais, novelist
- Louis Marriott, playwright, actor, director, journalist
- Una Marson, writer, broadcaster
- Claude McKay, writer
- Alecia McKenzie, writer
- Anthony McNeill, poet
- Brian Meeks, novelist
- Kei Miller, writer
- Pamela Mordecai, poet
- Mervyn Morris, poet
- Mutabaruka, poet
- Oku Onuora, writer
- Geoffrey Philp, writer
- Patricia Powell, novelist
- Claudia Rankine, poet
- Barry Reckord, playwright
- Victor Stafford Reid, writer
- Leone Ross, novelist, editor, short story writer, journalist, academic
- Andrew Salkey, writer
- Dennis Scott, poet and playwright
- Olive Senior, writer
- Malachi Smith, poet
- Pamela Colman Smith, artist and writer
- Michael Thelwell, writer
- Vivian Virtue, poet
- Sylvia Wynter, writer
- Kerry Young, author

== Models ==
- Tyson Beckford, model
- Martine Beswick, model, actress
- Carla Campbell, model
- Naomi Campbell, model
- Winnie Harlow, model
- Grace Jones, model, musician, actress
- Venice Kong, Playboy playmate
- Stacey McKenzie, supermodel, actress and model coach
- Rachel Stuart, model, television personality
- Karin Taylor, former Playboy model

== Musicians, actors and filmmakers ==
- Aidonia, dancehall, rap DJ
- DJ Akademiks, blogger
- Alaine, singer
- Monty Alexander, jazz pianist and composer
- Cherine Anderson, singer, actress, director
- Esther Anderson, actress, filmmaker, photographer
- Buju Banton, reggae singer
- Roxanne Beckford, actress and producer
- Beenie Man, DJ; Grammy winner
- Thom Bell, musician, singer-songwriter, arranger and producer
- Barbara Blake Hannah, filmmaker, festival organiser
- Bounty Killer, reggae musician
- Carl Bradshaw, actor, film producer
- Yvonne Brewster, actress, theatre director
- Brigadier Jerry, reggae musician, dancehall DJ
- Dennis Brown, reggae singer
- Gregory Isaacs, reggae singer
- Burning Spear, real name Winston Rodney, reggae musician
- Busy Signal, dancehall and reggae musician DJ
- Canibus, rapper
- Charlie Chaplin, reggae singer
- Clive Chin, record producer
- Tessanne Chin, singer-songwriter, winner of NBC's The Voice Season 5 in 2013
- Vincent "Randy" Chin, record producer, co-founder of VP Records
- Chipmunk, rapper, songwriter
- Chubb Rock, rapper, radio personality
- Tami Chynn, singer-songwriter
- Jimmy Cliff, singer, reggae musician
- Count Ossie, Rastafari drummer and band leader
- Patricia Cumper, producer, director, theatre administrator, critic and commentator
- Yvonne Curtis, reggae singer-songwriter
- Desmond Dekker, ska and reggae singer
- Demarco, reggae and dancehall musician
- Coxsone Dodd, record producer
- Clancy Eccles, ska and reggae singer, record producer
- Eek-a-Mouse, reggae singer
- Elephant Man, reggae singer
- Horace Faith, reggae singer
- Chuck Fenda, singer
- FKA Twigs, singer
- Honor Ford-Smith, actress, playwright, poet
- Dean Fraser, reggae musician
- Kirk Fraser, film director, film producer, screenwriter
- Ghetts, grime MC
- Joe Gibbs, record producer
- Andrew Gourlay, conductor
- Mona Hammond, actress
- Dahlia Harris, actress and television personality
- Heavy D, rapper
- Sean Paul Henriques, dancehall musician
- Toots Hibbert, reggae musician
- Joseph Hill, reggae musician and band leader, Culture
- Deni Hines, singer
- Marcia Hines, singer
- Stephen Hopkins, film director
- Giggs, rapper
- Grace Jones, singer and actress
- Natalia Kills, singer
- K-Anthony, gospel singer
- Ini Kamoze, reggae musician
- Kano, rapper, actor
- Koffee, reggae musician
- Vybz Kartel, dancehall musician, rapper, DJ
- Wynton Kelly, jazz pianist
- Joseph Hoo Kim, record producer
- Diana King, reggae musician
- King Tubby, dub musician
- Sean Kingston, singer
- Sean Paul, singer
- Kiprich, DJ
- DJ Kool Herc, DJ
- Byron Lee, ska and soca musician
- Rusty Lee, actress, singer, television personality
- Barrington Levy, reggae singer
- Mad Cobra, dancehall DJ
- Bob Marley, reggae singer
- Damian Marley, reggae musician
- Ky-Mani Marley, reggae musician
- Rita Marley, reggae singer; wife of Bob Marley
- Stephen Marley, singer
- Ziggy Marley, reggae musician; son of Bob Marley
- Mavado, dancehall and reggae musician
- Winston McAnuff, reggae and dub singer and composer aka Electric Dread
- Carmen McRae, singer
- Mr. Vegas, DJ
- Hugh Mundell, reggae singer-songwriter
- The Notorious B.I.G., rapper
- Augustus Pablo, reggae singer
- PARTYNEXTDOOR, singer
- Patra, dancehall musician
- Dawn Penn, reggae singer
- Lee "Scratch" Perry, reggae musician
- Leigh-Anne Pinnock, singer
- Prince Buster, ska singer and producer
- Ernest Ranglin, jazz, ska, rocksteady and reggae guitarist
- Ras Droppa, reggae artist
- Lloyd Reckord, actor, producer, director, playwright
- Duke Reid, record producer
- Pete Rock, record producer, DJ, rapper
- Wayne Rhoden, singer-songwriter
- Tarrus Riley, singer
- Tenor Saw, reggae artist
- Sasha, DJ
- Lady Saw, reggae musician
- Serani, reggae singer
- Shabba Ranks, reggae musician
- Shaggy, singer-songwriter
- Shenseea, rapper
- Madge Sinclair, Emmy-winning actress
- Sister Nancy, dancehall DJ
- Sizzla, reggae and dancehall deejay
- Millie Small, singer-songwriter
- Mikey Smith, dub poet
- Spice, dancehall musician
- Spot, rapper
- Spragga Benz, reggae and dancehall DJ
- Neville Staple, singer
- Stefflon Don, rapper
- Peter Tosh, reggae musician
- Ruby Turner, singer-songwriter and actress
- Tyga, rapper
- Bunny Wailer, reggae singer
- Ashley Walters, actor
- Walshy Fire, DJ
- Willard White, operatic bass-baritone
- will.i.am, rapper, singer-songwriter and record producer
- Peter Williams, actor
- Wretch 32, rapper
- XXXTentacion, rapper and singer-songwriter
- Yellowman, reggae and dancehall DJ

== Politicians ==
- Kenneth Baugh, minister of health and deputy prime minister
- Barbara Blake-Hannah, first Rastafarian representative in the Jamaican parliament
- Alexander Bustamante, trade unionist and prime minister, national hero
- Phyllis Coard, revolutionary and politician in Grenada
- R. James deRoux, longest-serving custos rotulorum
- Bruce Golding, prime minister
- Lisa Hanna, minister of Youth & Culture, former Miss World
- Kamala Harris, vice president of the United States
- Abraham Hodgson, member of House of Assembly of Jamaica
- Andrew Holness, prime minister
- Hyman Isaac Long, deputy inspector general of the Grand Consistory of the twenty-five degree "Rite of the Royal Secret" (11 January 1795)
- Kenneth Jones, minister of communications and works
- Michael Manley, prime minister
- Norman Manley, prime minister and Jamaican national hero
- Earle Maynier, first Jamaican high commissioner to Canada
- Henry Moore, colonial governor
- Trevor Munroe, trade unionist and politician
- P. J. Patterson, prime minister
- Noah Nickolas Perry, American politician and diplomat who had served as the United States ambassador to Jamaica
- Edward Seaga, prime minister
- Portia Simpson-Miller, prime minister
- Tom Tavares-Finson, president of the Senate of Jamaica

== Religious leaders ==
- S. U. Hastings, first Jamaican bishop of the Moravian Church
- Rev Rose Josephine Hudson-Wilkin, Bishop of Dover and first black woman to become a Church of England bishop; first black woman to hold the role of Queen's Chaplain; served as Chaplain to the Speaker of the House of Commons 2010–2019
- Oliver Lyseight, founder of one of Britain's largest black majority churches, and spiritual leader to the "Windrush generation"
- Neville Neil, bishop of the Moravian Church in Jamaica

== Science and medicine ==
- Evan Dale Abel, Jamaican-born endocrinologist
- Maydianne Andrade, Jamaican-born Canadian ecologist
- Simone Badal-McCreath, Jamaican chemist and cancer researcher
- Walt Braithwaite, Jamaican-born American engineer and former executive at Boeing
- Aggrey Burke, Jamaican-born psychiatrist and the first black consultant psychiatrist appointed by Britain's National Health Service (NHS)
- Nira Chamberlain, first black mathematician to join British mathematicians in the reference book Who's Who; creator of a mathematical cost capability trade-off model for HMS Queen Elizabeth
- Paul R. Cunningham, Jamaican-born surgeon and medical educator
- Patricia Daley, Jamaican-born British human geographer and academic
- Patricia DeLeon, Jamaican reproductive geneticist who specialists in the male reproductive system
- Tashni-Ann Dubroy, Jamaican science academic and university administrator in the United States
- Kevin Fenton, epidemiologist and a regional director at Public Health England
- Yvette Francis-McBarnette, Jamaican-born paediatrician
- Bertram Fraser-Reid, Jamaican synthetic organic chemist
- Neil Gardner, Jamaican chiropractic neurologist, former athlete
- Thomas J. Goreau, Jamaican biogeochemist and marine biologist
- Philip Henry Gosse, English naturalist in Jamaica
- Neil Hanchard, Jamaican physician and clinical investigator
- Odette Harris, Jamaican-born professor of neurosurgery at Stanford University and the Director of the Brain Injury Program for the Stanford University School of Medicine
- Richard Hill, lawyer, naturalist
- Jacqueline Hughes-Oliver, Jamaican-born statistician
- Hedley Jones, Jamaican audio engineer and astronomer
- Thomas Lecky, Jamaican scientist who developed several new breeds of cattle
- Elsa Leo-Rhynie, Jamaican science academic
- Henry Lowe, Jamaican scientist, philanthropist and businessman
- Camille McKayle, Jamaican-born mathematician
- Harold Moody, Jamaican physician
- Ludlow Moody, Jamaican physician
- Errol Morrison, Jamaican scientist who has carried out pioneering work in the field of diabetes
- Karen E. Nelson, Jamaican-born American microbiologist
- Charles Palache (1869–1954) – mineralogist and crystallographer at Harvard University
- Geoff Palmer, Jamaican-born scientist
- Donald Richards, statistician
- Mercedes Richards, Jamaican-born pioneering astronomy and astrophysics professor
- Robert Robinson, Jamaican-born engineer
- Mary Seacole, Jamaican-born woman of Scottish and Creole descent who set up a "British hotel" behind the lines during the Crimean War
- Jean Springer, Jamaican mathematics professor
- Garth Taylor, Jamaican ophthalmologist, professor, and humanitarian
- Manley West, Jamaican pharmacologist who developed a treatment for glaucoma
- Cicely Williams, identified the protein deficiency disease kwashiorkor
- Henry Vernon Wong, Jamaican-American physicist known for his work in plasma physics

== Sports ==
- Maurice Ashley, Chess Player, Jamaican-born American chess grandmaster
- Alia Atkinson, OD, multiple time Olympic swimmer
- Donovan Bailey, Jamaican-born Canadian, world champion sprinter
- Leon Bailey, Jamaican footballer playing for Aston Villa FC
- John Barnes, Jamaican-born English football player; played for the England national football team and Liverpool F.C.
- Trevor Berbick, champion boxer
- Atari Bigby, former football player
- Andre Blake, professional MLS goalkeeper
- Yohan Blake, sprinter
- Usain Bolt, world and Olympic record holder, 100m and 200m
- Walter Boyd, former professional footballer
- Steve Bucknor, international cricket umpire
- Veronica Campbell-Brown, sprinter
- Alicia Ashley, former women's boxing champion
- Omar Cummings, Jamaican-born MLS and Jamaica national football team football player
- Chili Davis, Jamaican-born American, former star Major League Baseball player
- Leon Edwards, Jamaican-born, British mixed martial artist and UFC welterweight champion
- Patrick Ewing, Jamaican-born American, former NBA star
- Junior Flemmings, professional footballer
- Heather Foster, Jamaican-born American professional bodybuilder
- Shaun Francis, former professional footballer
- Shelly-Ann Fraser-Pryce, sprinter, 100m and 200m World and Olympic record holder (Beijing 2008 and London 2012), fondly known as "The Pocket Rocket"
- Ricardo Fuller, Jamaican-born Premier League and Jamaica national football team football player
- Ricardo Gardner, Jamaican-born Premier League and Jamaica national football team football player
- Chris Gayle, Captain of West Indian International Cricket Team
- Ian Goodison, former professional footballer
- Owayne Gordon, professional footballer
- George Headley, cricketer
- Sek Henry, basketball player
- Wavell Hinds, cricketer
- Michael Holding, cricketer
- Shericka Jackson, Olympic medalist
- Kamara James, Jamaican-born American, Olympic fencer
- Ben Johnson, Jamaican-born Canadian, disgraced champion sprinter
- Glen Johnson, champion boxer
- Ryan Johnson, former professional footballer
- Jerome Jordan, NBA player, New York Knicks center #44
- Andrew Kennedy, professional basketball player
- Brynton Lemar (born 1995), American-born Jamaican basketball player for Hapoel Jerusalem of the Israeli Basketball Premier League
- Oscar Levis (1898–1983) – Negro league Jewish pitcher who was the first Jamaican-born player in a recognized major league
- Rajiv Maragh, jockey
- Tyrone Marshall, Jamaican-born MLS and Jamaica national football team football player
- Darren Mattocks, Jamaican-born MLS and Jamaica national football team football player
- Mike McCallum, champion boxer
- Oshane Nation, FIFA football referee
- Joirdon Nicholas (born 1999), Jamaican-American basketball player in the Israeli Basketball Premier League
- Merlene Ottey, Jamaican-born Slovenian sprinter, the world's most winning female athlete
- Asafa Powell, sprinter, former 100m world record holder
- Donald Quarrie, sprinter
- Shawn Rhoden, bodybuilder
- Sanya Richards-Ross, Jamaican-born American sprinter, 400m
- Donovan Ricketts, Jamaican-born MLS and Jamaica national football team football player
- Tessa Sanderson, Jamaican-born former British Javelin gold medalist and Heptathlon
- Trecia-Kaye Smith, former Triple Jump World Champion
- Raheem Sterling, Jamaican-born English football player; currently plays for Chelsea FC
- Shavar Thomas, Jamaican-born MLS and Jamaica national football team football player
- Elaine Thompson-Herah, OD, multiple Olympic champion
- Stephen Tulloch, National Football League middle linebacker for Detroit Lions and N.C. State Wolfpac; born in Miami of Jamaican heritage
- Peter-Lee Vassell, professional footballer
- Melaine Walker, sprinter, 400m Olympic record holder (Beijing 2008)
- Courtney Walsh, cricketer
- Nicholas Walters, professional boxer, former WBA (Super) World Featherweight champion
- Devon White, Major League Baseball player
- Theodore Whitmore, former professional footballer, coach
- Arthur Wint, OD MBE, Olympic former 400m gold medalist

== Others ==
- Diane Abbott, first female member of the African-Caribbean community to be elected to the UK House of Commons in 1987
- Hope Arthurine Anderson, national chess champion and Olympian
- Emily Rose Bleby (1849–1917), temperance reformer
- Violet Brown, oldest Jamaican in history
- Dawn Butler, Labour MP since 2015; became first black woman to speak from the despatch box in the House of Commons in December 2009
- Alan Eyre, geographer and environmentalist
- Michael Fuller, Britain's first black Police Chief Constable and Chief Inspector of the Crown Prosecution Service
- Marcus Garvey, founder of the Universal Negro Improvement Association (UNIA)
- St. William Grant, trade unionist and activist
- Henry Gunter, civil rights campaigner, trade unionist and the first black delegate to be elected to the Birmingham Trades Council
- Stuart Hall, cultural theorist, political activist and co-founder of New Left Review
- Rosalea Hamilton, Jamaican academic, trade policy specialist
- Thomas Duffus Hardy, archivist and antiquary
- Donald J. Harris, economist
- Lenford "Steve" Harvey, AIDS activist
- Barrington Irving, pilot who previously held the record for the youngest person to pilot a plane around the world solo
- Baroness Lawrence, campaigner
- Ian McKnight, founder of Jamaica AIDS Support for LIFE
- Isaac P. Mendes (1853–1904) – Jamaican-born rabbi who led Congregation Mickve Israel in Savannah, Georgia
- Bill Morris, general secretary of the Transport and General Workers' Union 1992–2003, black leader of a major British trade union
- Colin Powell, politician, statesman, diplomat, and United States Army officer who served as the 65th United States Secretary of State 2001–2005; first African-American Secretary of State
- Roxroy Salmon, Jamaican-American immigration activist
- Oliver Samuels, comedian and actor
- Norma Shirley, Jamaican chef
- Tony Simpson, businessman and broadcaster

== See also ==
- List of Jamaican British people
- List of Jamaican Americans
- List of Jamaican Jews
