= Ken Parker (musician) =

Jamaican musician (1948–2025)

- Born: Kenneth L. Farquharson; 23 February 1948; Darliston, Westmoreland Parish, Colony of Jamaica
- Died: 22 February 2025 (aged 76) Florida, U.S.
- Genres: Reggae
- Instrument: Vocals
- Label: Studio One

Kenneth L. Farquharson (23 February 1948 – 22 February 2025), known professionally as Ken Parker, was a Jamaican musician who first recorded in the 1960s.

== Life and career ==
Parker was born in Darliston, Westmoreland Parish, Jamaica on 23 February 1948. Like many of Jamaica's singers of the era, Parker began by singing in church, where his father was a preacher. He formed a group called the Blues Benders in the mid-1960s, and their first recording was "Honeymoon by the Sea". The group arranged to audition for Coxsone Dodd, but due to a misunderstanding, Parker was the only member to turn up, so he auditioned as a soloist, impressing Dodd sufficiently to launch his solo career. While at Studio One, he recorded singles such as "Choking Kind", "Run Come", and "My Whole World is Falling Down", and an album, Keep Your Eyes on Jesus, followed in 1968. He moved on to work with Duke Reid, who produced hits including "Jimmy Brown", "Help Me Make it Through the Night", and "Kiss an Angel Good Morning". His popularity continued to grow and he recorded for other producers including Bunny Lee ("Guilty"), Rupie Edwards ("Talk About Love"), Byron Lee and Karl Pitterson ( Ada R. Habershon's "Will the Circle be Unbroken"), Lloyd Charmers and Brad Osborne (for whom he sang a cover version of The Techniques' "Queen Majesty"), also versioning Sam Cooke's " You Send Me" and recording for Joe Gibbs ("Only Yesterday").

By 1972, however, Parker had become disillusioned with the recording industry and ceased recording, relocating to England in 1973 after spending two years in New York City.In the late 70s-early 80s, Ken Parker also recorded some contemplative, spiritual roots reggae discomixes for Roy Cousins record labels, Uhuru, Tamoki, Wambesi, Dove & Tamoki-Wambesi/Tamoki Wambesi Dove, backed by the Roots Radics on tunes like “What Kind of World,” a compassionate meditation on poverty and the vanity of materialistic prisms on life. He continued to perform occasionally but did not return to recording until the early 1980s, setting up his own record label and production company, releasing gospel records. He later moved to Florida. In April 2014, he performed to a sold-out show at the International Ska and Reggae Festival in London.

Parker died on 22 February 2025, a day before his 77th birthday.

== Discography ==
=== Albums ===
- Keep Your Eyes on Jesus (1968) Studio One/Tabernacle
- Jimmy Brown (1974) Trojan
- Here Comes Ken Parker (1974)
- A Touch of Inspiration (1984) Pisces
- I Shall Not Be Moved (1984) Pisces
- Jesus on the Main Line (1985) Pisces
- The Key (1990) Body Music

=== Compilation albums ===
- A Glint of Gold (1986) Pisces
- The Best of: Groovin' in Style! (2003) Trojan
