= Trinity Moravian Church, Jamaica =

Trinity Moravian Church
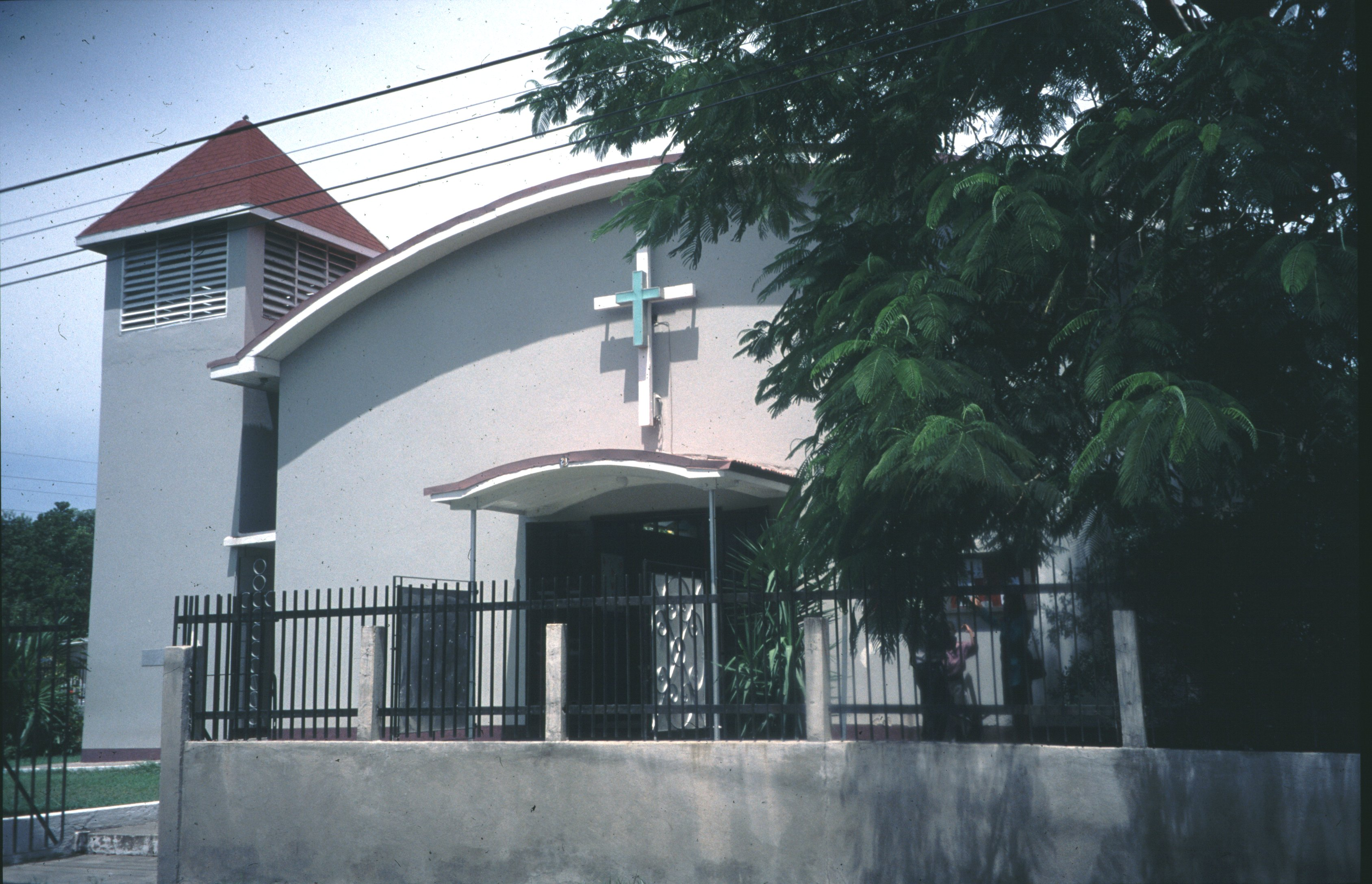
- Trinity Moravian Church in 2002
- Trinity Moravian Church
- 18.0061°N 76.8070°W
- Location: 29 Montgomery Avenue, Kingston 10
- Country: Jamaica
- Denomination: Moravian

History
- Status: Church
- Founded: 1954
- Consecrated: 1956-01-18

Architecture
- Functional status: Active
- Groundbreaking: 1954
- Completed: 1956

Specifications
- Capacity: 400

Clergy
- Bishop: Stanley G. Clarke

Trinity Moravian church houses a congregation of the Jamaican province of the Moravian Church. It was established in 1954 as part of the bicentenary celebrations of the Moravian Church in Jamaica.

== Church building ==
The foundation stone was laid on 1954-12-09, and the building was dedicated on 1956-01-18 "with the then Governor, Sir Hugh Foot, Prime Minister Norman Manley, Bishop Kneale and Br. Ben Muncaster all taking part".

The land in Richmond Park on which the church was built belonged to a prominent Roman Catholic family, one of whose members, Sam Carter, later became Roman Catholic Bishop of Jamaica.

Richmond Park was a newly developed housing area inhabited largely by professional and business people. The church was strategically placed near the border between Richmond Park and less prosperous areas. Church members came from all the neighbouring areas so that the congregation provided a meeting point for people from different social and economic groups who might not otherwise have met.

While the church was being built, services were held in a nearby home so that when the church was opened, communicant membership was already 61, rising to over 400 by 1966, with large numbers of young people and children in Sunday School and youth organisations.

== Manse ==
The manse, to the north east of the church was completed in 1961–1964.

== Hall ==
The church hall was opened at about the same time as the church, and was extended c. 1971.

== Organ ==
An electric organ was purchased for the opening of the church.

== Clergy ==
1954-1956	S U Hastings
1956-1959	Ben Muncaster; Robert Cuthbert (assistant)
1959-1964	S U Hastings
1964-1973	Fred Linyard
1973-1983	Justin Peart
1983-19??	Leslie McKoy
19??-19??	Trevor Palmer
c2008-2011	Trevor Dawkins

2011- Jermaine Gibson

== Ministry ==
From the very beginning, the strength of the congregation has been in the large number of faithful and highly competent members who have given leadership in the various areas of congregation life. Without a capable Board of Stewards (Committee) and the Board of Elders, who assist in the pastoral care of the congregation, ministering effectively to a congregation such as Trinity would be near impossible.

In more recent years, in addition to the regular worship, the work among young people and with women's and men's groups, two of the main outreach services offered by the congregation are a Skills Training Centre, where students learn about clothes making and food preparation, and a weekly feeding programme catering for around 40 needy people.

== Bibliography ==
- Hastings, S U & MacLeavy, B L (1979), Seedtime and Harvest (A Brief History of the Moravian Church in Jamaica 1754-1979), The Moravian Church Corporation
