= Noel Howell =

American film director

- Born: Antigua
- Education: M.D. (1994), University of Miami
- Occupations: Pediatrician, Filmmaker
- Children: 1

Noel Howell is an Antiguan pediatrician, filmmaker, producer and director based in New York City.

== Career ==
Howell received his M.D. from the University of Miami School of Medicine in 1994, and began working in Bronx, New York as a pediatrician. In 1998 he formed the not-for-profit group Children Living With Aids, Inc., motivated by his discovery that HIV-positive children were being barred from the entertainment sessions that he, his son and his daughter were providing to hospitalized children.

Howell also graduated from the Film School of New York University. His 2009 film Redemption of Paradise was named best Caribbean film at the 2010 Jamaica International Reggae Film Festival.

In February 2010, he was appointed roving film ambassador for the Motion Picture Association of Antigua & Barbuda. Upon the release of Redemption of Paradise shortly afterwards, it was rewarded Special Honor Award for Best Caribbean Film and two other awards at the Reggae Film Festival.

In 2011, Howell appeared as a defendant on an episode of reality court show Judge Judy, after being sued by makeup artist Melissa Poncelet del Sole for non-payment after she provided services for a film on which Howell had been working. During Howell’s testimony, he did an absurd impression of what he claimed the plaintiff was doing while intoxicated. The clip has since gone viral on various social media, most notably YouTube.

In 2014 Howell established a mathematics award with the Ministry of Education in Antigua and Barbuda, providing nine outstanding public school students with $500 each for outstanding performance in mathematics.

== Filmography ==
- Once in an Island (2009)
- Book of Songs (2010)
- Redemption of Paradise (2010)
