= Winston Anderson =

Winston Anderson may refer to:

- Winnie Anderson (1909-1952), American football player
- Winston A. Anderson (1940-), American scientist
