= Patricia de Leon =

Patricia de / De Leon / DeLeon may refer to:

- Patricia de la Garza De León (1775–1849), co-founder of Victoria, Texas
- Patricia de Leon (actress) (born 1976), Panamanian model and actress
- Patricia DeLeon (born 1944), Jamaican reproductive geneticist
