= Judith A. Todd =

British-American materials scientist

Judith A. Todd PhD
- Title: P. B. Breneman Chair of the Department of Engineering Science and Mechanics

Academic work
- Discipline: Engineering
- Sub-discipline: Materials science
- Institutions: Pennsylvania State University

Judith A. Todd is a British-American materials scientist whose research topics have included multilayered coatings, the properties of metal alloys and ceramics, the use of lasers in the nondestructive analysis of materials, and the history of ancient metallurgy. She is the P. B. Breneman Chair at Pennsylvania State University, where she heads the Department of Engineering Science and Mechanics.

== Education and career ==
Todd is originally from Wakefield in West Yorkshire. She studied materials science at the University of Cambridge, earning a bachelor's degree in 1972, and completing her Ph.D. in 1977; her dissertation topic concerned archaeometry, and in particular the applications of materials science to archaeology. Her field work for her dissertation took her to work with the Deemay people of Ethiopia, studying ancient ironworking techniques.

After postdoctoral research at Imperial College and Stony Brook University, she became a researcher on a project in the development of new steel alloys at the University of California, Berkeley, funded by the Department of Energy. From there she moved to faculty positions at the University of Southern California, and, in 1990, the Illinois Institute of Technology, where she was named the Iron and Steel Society Professor in 1995 and, later, associate dean for research. In 2000 she moved to her present position at Pennsylvania State University.

== Service and recognition ==
Todd was the 2009 president of the Society of Engineering Science, the vice-president for manufacturing of the American Society of Mechanical Engineers from 2002 to 2005, and the president of ASM International from 2021 to 2022.

She was named a Fellow of the American Society of Mechanical Engineers in 2001, and is also a Fellow of ASM International and of the Association for Women in Science. In 2006 she won the Presidential Award for Excellence in Science, Mathematics, and Engineering Mentoring.
