= Church of the Redeemer, Jamaica =

The Church of the Redeemer
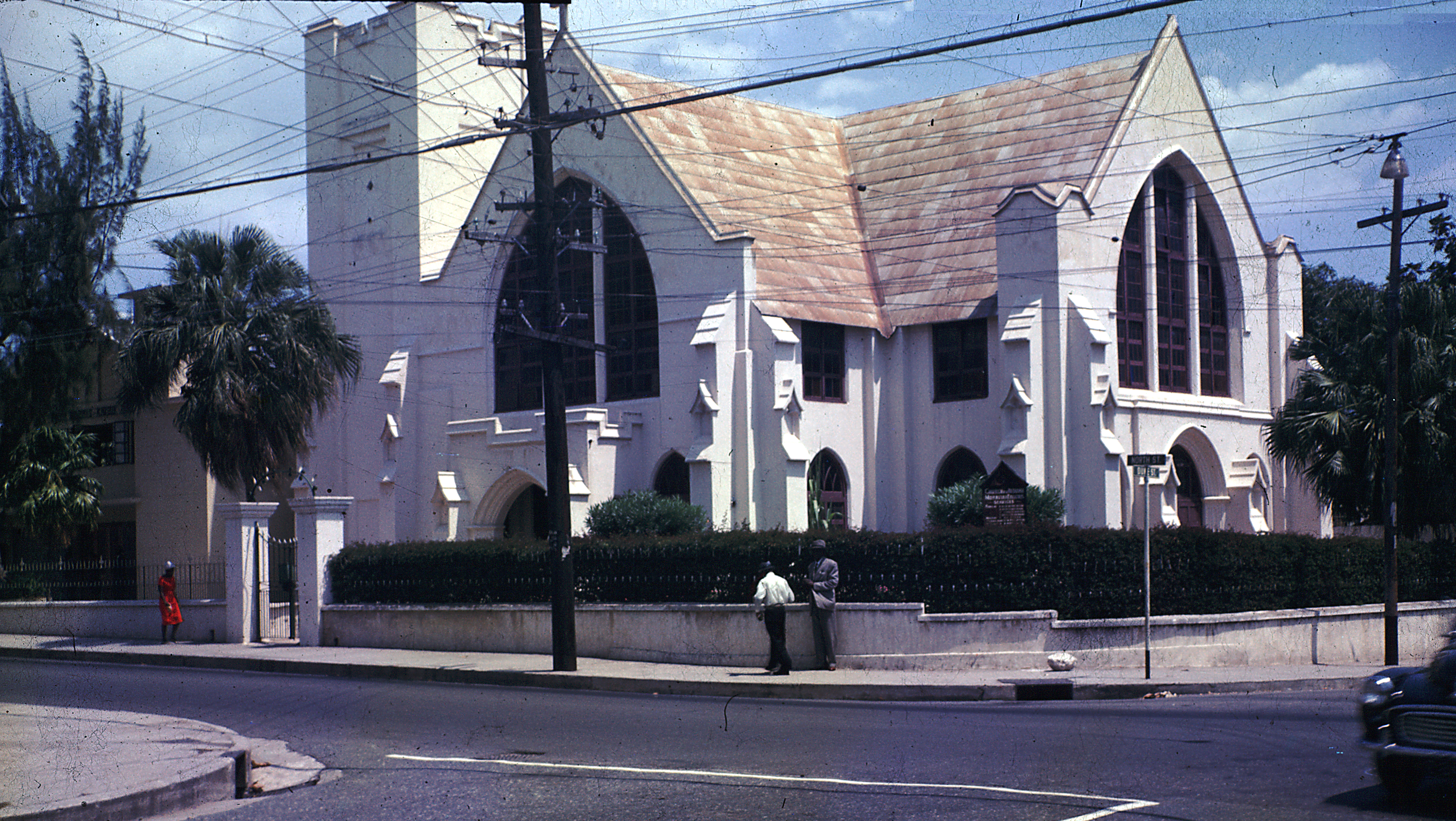
- The Church of the Redeemer, corner of North and Duke Streets, Kingston, Jamaica, 1963.
- The Church of the Redeemer
- 17.975753°N 76.790062°W
- Location: Kingston
- Country: Jamaica
- Denomination: Moravian
- Website: www.jamaicamoravian.com www.techadvancejamaica.com/moravian.html

History
- Status: Church
- Founded: 1918
- Founder: Jonathan Reinke
- Consecrated: 1918-05-08

Architecture
- Functional status: Active
- Completed: 1918
- Construction cost: £3,124

The Church of the Redeemer is the oldest Moravian Church building in Kingston, Jamaica, and houses a congregation of the Jamaican province of the Moravian Church. It was opened in 1918. The name, which is unusual for a Moravian church, was bestowed by its builder Jonathan Reinke "because he did not want people to speak of Reinke's church".

== History ==
=== First building ===
Kingston's first Moravian Church (at 23 Hanover Street) was a large house which was adapted for the purpose and consecrated on April 14, 1893. This building and the Mission House next door (at 25 Hanover Street) were destroyed in 1907 by an earthquake. Two sheds were erected to replace them while a new church building was constructed.

=== Present building ===
The building at the corner of North Street and Duke Street was consecrated by Bishop Westphal on May 8, 1918. The total cost of the building, site and out buildings was £3,124.

=== Manse ===
A new manse, on the north side of North Street a block to the east, was completed in 1927 at a cost of £921. The manse site was sold to the Gleaner Company for £4,000 in 1949 and a new manse purchased in Antrim Road, Vineyard Town.

=== Hall ===
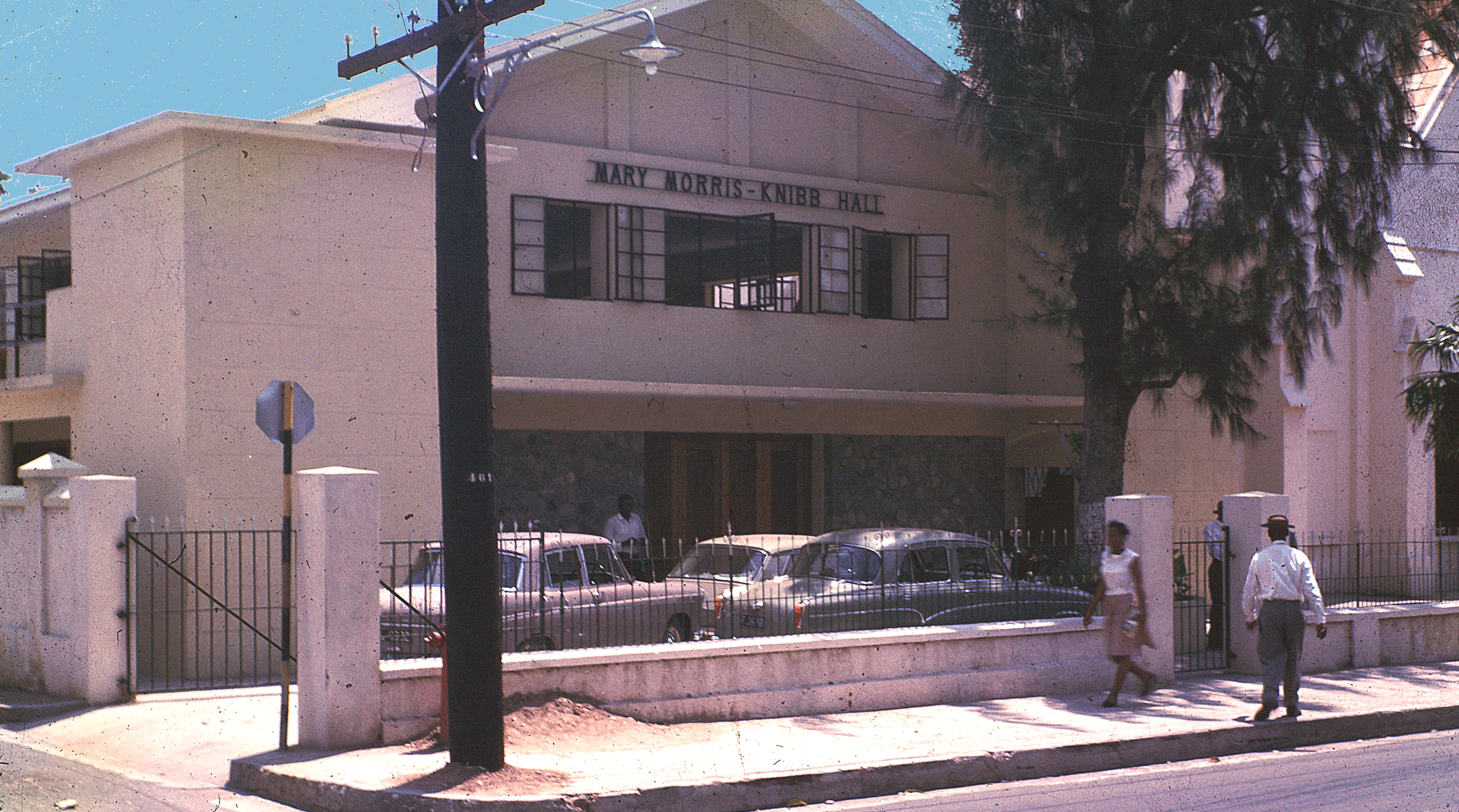
The Mary Morris-Knibb memorial hall, 1963.

A church hall was opened on December 30, 1930 by Lady Stubbs, wife of the Governor. This was destroyed by the hurricane of 1951. A replacement hall was opened on February 28, 1962 at a cost of £16,000.

=== Organ ===
A pipe organ was installed in 1932, reconstructed in 1945 and destroyed during the 1951 hurricane. A replacement was installed in 1953 at a cost of over £3,000.

== Clergy ==
1893-1894	Bishop Hannah
1894-1896	G H Lopp
1896-1928	Jonathan Reinke
1929-1932	John Kneale

1932-1939	W M O'Meally
1939-1944	W A Kaltreider
1944-1946	John Kneale
1946-1947	J P Davidson

1947-1951	H T Cuthbert
1951-1957	S U Hastings
1957-1959	Ben Muncaster
1959-1977	Neville S Neil

== Bibliography ==
Hastings, S U & MacLeavy, B L (1979), Seedtime and Harvest (A Brief History of the Moravian Church in Jamaica 1754-1979), The Moravian Church Corporation
