= Cicely Williams =

Jamaican physician (1893–1992)

The Honourable Cicely Williams OM CMG FRCP
- Born: Cicely Delphine Williams; 2 December 1893; Kew Park, Darliston, Westmoreland, Colony of Jamaica, British Empire
- Died: 13 July 1992 (aged 98); Oxford, England
- Education: Somerville College, Oxford; London School of Hygiene and Tropical Medicine; King's College Hospital
- Known for: Discovery of kwashiorkor and advancing the field of maternal and paediatric health in developing nations
- Scientific career
- Fields: Pediatrics, Nutrition, Biochemistry
- Workplaces: Queen Elizabeth Hospital for Children; World Health Organization; University of Singapore; London School of Hygiene & Tropical Medicine

Cicely Delphine Williams OM CMG FRCP (2 December 1893 – 13 July 1992) was a Jamaican physician, most notable for her discovery and research into kwashiorkor, a condition of advanced malnutrition, and her campaign against the use of sweetened condensed milk and other artificial baby milks as substitutes for human breast milk.

One of the first female graduates of the University of Oxford, Williams was instrumental in advancing the field of maternal and child health in developing nations, and in 1948 became the first director of Mother and Child Health (MCH) at the newly created World Health Organization (WHO). She once remarked that "if you learn your nutrition from a biochemist, you're not likely to learn how essential it is to blow a baby's nose before expecting him to suck."

== Early life ==
Cicely Delphine Williams was born in Kew Park, Darliston, Westmoreland, Jamaica into a family which had lived there for generations. She was the daughter of James Rowland Williams (1860–1916), and Margaret Emily Caroline Farewell (1862–1953). Her father is said to have remarked, when Cicely was nine years old, that she had better become a lady doctor as she was unlikely to find a husband. At 13 she left Jamaica to be educated in England, beginning her studies in Bath and was then awarded a place at Somerville College, Oxford when she was 19. She deferred her place at college, as she returned to Jamaica to help her parents after a devastating series of earthquakes and hurricanes. After the death of her father in 1916, Williams, then 23, returned to Oxford and began studying medicine. Williams was one of the first female students admitted into the course, only because of the death of male students caused by World War I. She graduated in 1923.

Williams qualified from King's College Hospital in 1923, at 31, and worked for two years at the Queen Elizabeth Hospital for Children in Hackney. There, Williams decided to specialise in paediatrics, acknowledging that to be an effective physician she must have first hand knowledge of a child's home environment and background, a notion which would come to define her medical practice.

Due to the end of World War I, and the return of male physicians, Williams found it difficult to find a medical position following graduation. She worked for a term in Salonika with Turkish refugees. She completed a course at the London School of Hygiene and Tropical Medicine (LSHTM) from 1928–29 and afterwards applied to the Colonial Medical Service, and in 1929 was posted to the Gold Coast (now modern Ghana).

== Colonial Medical Service ==
Williams was employed specifically as a 'Woman Medical Officer'—a distinction she disagreed with, not least because it meant she was paid a lower rate than her male counterparts. Her role on the Gold Coast was to treat acutely ill infants and children, and give advice at a clinic level. Faced with the shocking rate of death and illness in the community, Williams trained nurses to do out-reach visits, and created 'well-baby visits' for the local community. She also began a patient information card system to assist with record keeping. Williams, while supportive of modern medicine and scientific techniques, was one of the few colonial physicians who gave credence to traditional medicine and local knowledge. Williams noted that while the child mortality was high, newborns were not represented nearly as highly as toddlers between two and four years. The repeated presentation of young children with swollen bellies and stick thin limbs who very often died despite treatment, piqued Williams's interest. This condition was often diagnosed as pellagra, a vitamin deficiency, but Williams disagreed, and carried out autopsies on the dead children at great personal risk to herself (there were no antibiotics in colonial Ghana, and she became severely ill with streptococcal haemolysis from a cut during one such procedure). Williams asked the local women what they called the condition which afflicted these children, and was told kwashiorkor, which Williams translated as 'disease of the deposed child'. Her findings—that the condition was due to a lack of protein in the diets of weanlings after the arrival of a new baby—were published in the Archives of Disease in Childhood in 1933.

Her colleagues in the colonies were quick to oppose her claims, particularly H. S. Stannus, regarded as an expert on African nutritional deficiency, and Williams thus followed up her paper with another, more directly contrasting kwashiorkor and pellagra, published in The Lancet in 1935. This did little to sway medical opinion, and colonial physicians continued to avoid using the term kwashiorkor, or even acknowledge that it was a distinct condition from pellagra, despite the continued deaths of thousands of children who were being treated for the latter condition. Williams remarked about the ongoing issue that '[t]hese men in Harley Street couldn't believe you unless you wore stripy trousers'.

Williams felt that kwashiorkor was a disease caused mostly through a lack of knowledge and information, and her desire to combine preventive and curative medicine caused her to clash with her superiors and in 1936, after over seven years of service on the Gold Coast, she was transferred 'in disgrace' to Malaya, to lecture at the University of Singapore.

== Malaya and World War II ==
In Malaya, Williams found a very different health care problem: The mortality of newborn infants was extremely high. She became incensed after learning that companies were employing women dressed as nurses to go to tenement houses and convince new mothers that sweetened condensed milk was a preferable replacement for breast milk. This practice was illegal in England and Europe, but Nestlé was exporting the milk to Malaysia and advertising it as 'ideal for delicate infants'. In 1939, Williams was invited to address the Singapore Rotary Club, the chairman of which was also the president of Nestlé, and gave a speech titled 'Milk and Murder', famously saying:

Misguided propaganda on infant feeding should be punished as the most miserable form of sedition; these deaths should be regarded as murder.

Williams oversaw the development and running of a primary health care centre in the province of Trengganu in northeastern Malaya, and was responsible for 23 other doctors and some 300,000 patients. The Japanese invaded in 1941, and Williams was forced to trek to Singapore to safety. Shortly after her arrival, Singapore too fell to the Japanese, and she was interned first at the Sime Road camp, and then later taken to Changi Prison with 6,000 other prisoners. She was jailed for three-and-a-half years at Changi, and became one of the camp leaders, a position that led to her being removed for six months to the Kempeitai headquarters where she was tortured, starved and kept in cages with dying men. Williams suffered dysentery, beriberi (which left her feet numb for the rest of her life) and when the war was declared over in 1945, she was in the hospital, near death.

On her return to England, Williams wrote a report titled Nutritional Conditions Among Women and Children in Internment in the Civilian Camp, noting that: '20 babies were born, 20 babies were breastfed, 20 babies survived, you can't do better than that'.

== Later years ==
In 1948, Williams was made head of the new Maternal and Child Health (MCH) division of the World Health Organization in Geneva, and later transferred back to Malaya to head all maternal and child welfare services in South-East Asia. In 1950, she oversaw the commission of an international survey into kwashiorkor across 10 nations in sub-Saharan Africa. This study found that the condition carried such a health burden that it represented 'the most serious and widespread nutritional disorder known to medical or nutritional science'. In her years with the organisation she lectured and advised on MCH in over 70 countries and was influential in promoting the advantages of local knowledge and resources as key to achieving health and wellness in local communities.

Following an outbreak of 'vomiting sickness' in Jamaica in 1951 the Government ordered an investigation 'to improve child care and investigate the causes of food poisoning'. Between 1951 and 1953, Williams coordinated this research and the results were published. This eventually led to the identification of the hypoglycaemic effects of unripe ackee.

From 1953–1955, she was a senior lecturer in Nutrition at the London School of Hygiene & Tropical Medicine, her alma mater. In 1960, Williams became Professor of Maternal and Child Services at the American University of Beirut. She stayed for four years, and in her time worked with the United Nations Relief and Works Agency (UNRWA) with the Palestinian refugees in the Gaza Strip. She also worked with at risk communities in Yugoslavia, Tanzania, Cyprus, Ethiopia and Uganda.

== Awards and honours ==
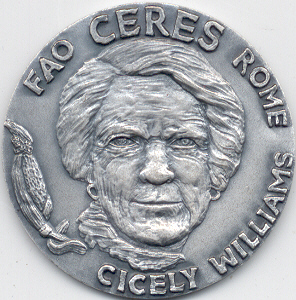
FAO CERES Medal in Silver, obverse face

In 1965, Williams was awarded the James Spence Gold Medal of the Royal College of Paediatrics and Child Health for the discovery of Kwashiorkor, a nutritional disease, in Accra and for recognising malnutrition was more likely to be caused by lack of nutritional knowledge rather than poverty.

In 1968, Williams was made a Companion of the Order of St Michael and St George (CMG), and introduced to Elizabeth II at a ceremony at Buckingham Palace. Her Majesty reputedly remarked: 'I can't remember where you've been'. To which Williams replied, 'Many places'. Her Majesty asked 'Doing what?'. With typical modesty, Williams is reported to have replied, 'Mostly looking after children'.

In 1977, Williams's likeness was used on the Food and Agriculture Organization's CERES Medal.

In 1986, Williams was awarded an honorary Doctorate of Science from the University of Ghana, for her 'love, care and devotion to sick children' and her citation mentioned that during her time as a colonial physician 'it became necessary to have the police keep order among the surging patients'.

== Legacy ==
Many authors have written of her achievements. In 2005, a Ghanaian physician Felix Konotey-Ahulu, wrote to The Lancet in praise of Williams's ability to identify and acknowledge the social context of diseases such as kwashiorkor, he mentions that her translation of the concept had yet to be bettered almost 70 years later, and commended her for her respect for local traditions, as evidenced by her referring to kwashiorkor by its local name.

Another article also recognised her for pioneering the field of maternal and child specific medicine, as during her early days in Ghana, such works was devalued as 'women's work' and outside the realms of proper modern medicine. She took copious photographs and notes cataloguing her time in Ghana, and admired the mothering skills of the native women, remarking that '[the baby] is carried about on the mother's back, a position it loves, it sleeps close beside her, it is nourished whenever it cries, and on the whole it does remarkably well on this treatment', while traditional British parenting recommended the separation of mothers from their infants whenever possible. The article concludes by recognising Williams's contribution to the field of primary health care, stating that after the war and into the modern day, her views becoming the 'gospel for the next generation'.

In writing about Africans of the Gold Coast, Williams noted that 'compared to the white races, he seems to lack initiative and constructive ideas, although he may be shrewd to judge the attainment of others [...] he is almost invariably dishonest".

In 1983, Sally Craddock published a biography entitled Retired, Except on Demand: The Life of Dr Cicely Williams, taking the title from Williams' declaration after her 'official retirement' at the age of 71. Dr Williams however continued actively travelling and speaking into her early 90s.

In 1986, a book entitled Primary Health Care Pioneer: The Selected Works of Dr Cicely D. Williams pronounced her as having fulfilled the "physician's dream" of diagnosing, investigating and discovering the cure for a new disease, and commended her for doing such in an environment without modern medical resources.

== Death ==
Williams died in Oxford in 1992 at the age of 98.
