= Bethabara Moravian Church, Jamaica =

Bethabara Moravian Church
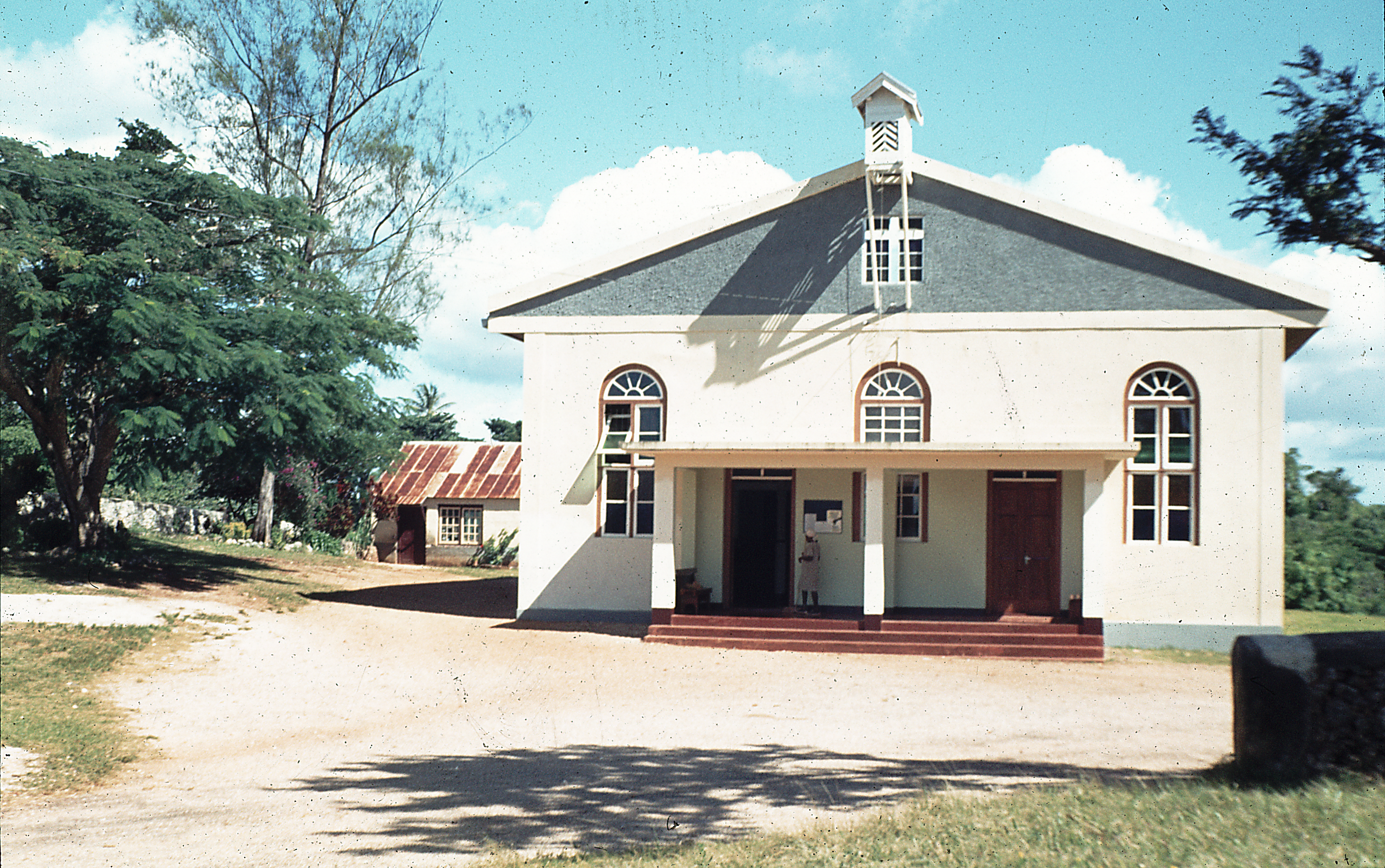
- Bethabara Moravian Church, 1979.

- Location within Jamaica
- 17.9638°N 77.5067°W
- Location: Newport, Manchester
- Country: Jamaica
- Denomination: Moravian
- Website: www.jamaicamoravian.com

History
- Status: Church
- Founded: 1827
- Consecrated: 1841-07-28

Architecture
- Functional status: Active
- Completed: 1841

Bethabara Moravian Church is a congregation of the Jamaica Province of the Moravian Church. It opened for worship on 1841-07-28.

== History ==
Moravian work in the vicinity began in 1827 as an outstation of Fairfield and continued until 1837 when the adherents were sent to join New Broughton or Ebenezer (both Presbyterian). In 1839 the minister of Fairfield resumed the work (at the request of the adherents) with services held in a leaky building at Isles. The ground breaking for the present church building was on 1840-01-16.

An elementary school was established in 1846 (in the church building initially) and an infant school in 1863.

Bethlehem Moravian College started here in 1861, closing in 1887 (after twenty six years) preparatory to the move to Malvern.

Patrick Town (1882) and Sharon (1950s) started as outstations of Bethabara. Broadleaf is at present Bethabara's only outstation.

The Newport Branch Library had its origin in the church building (1950s).

The congregation hosted the provincial synods of 1983 and 1989.

== Buildings ==
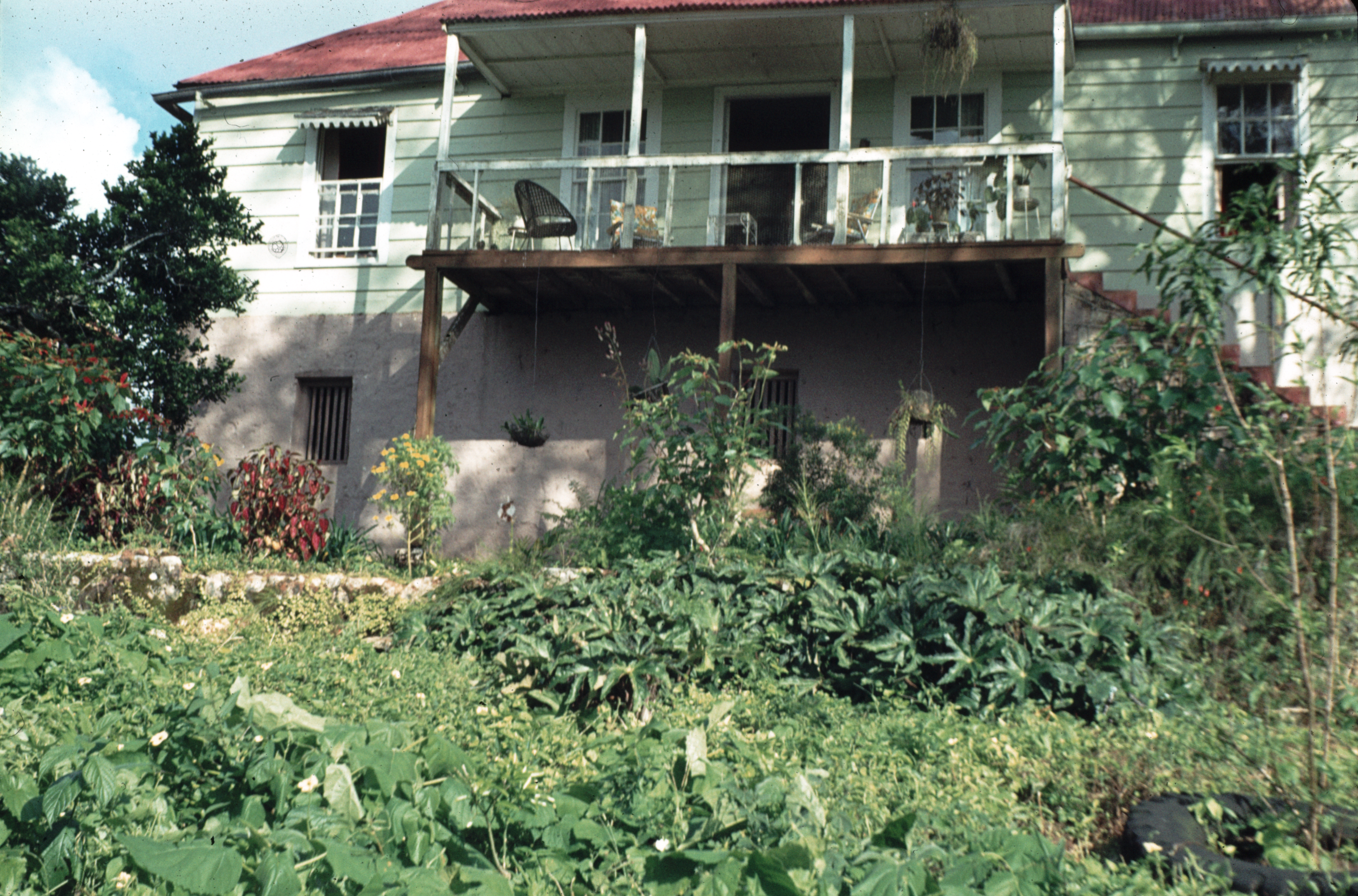
Bethabara Moravian Manse, 1979.

=== Church ===
A cut stone and mortar structure with a small wooden belfry to the front. The exterior of the building was rendered and painted late in the 20th century.

A pipe organ was obtained from Germany in the early 1890s.

=== Schools ===
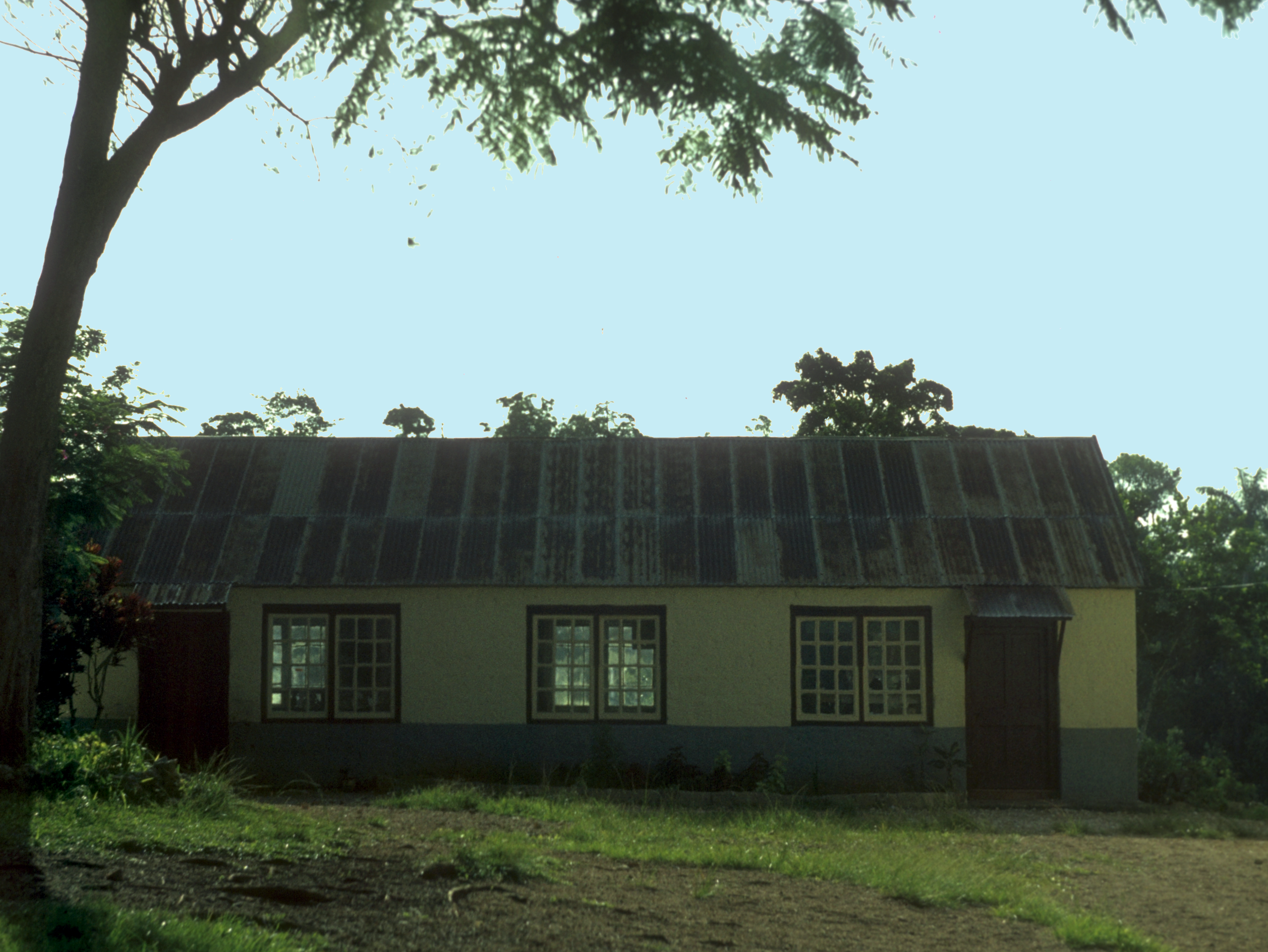
Bethabara infant school, 1978.

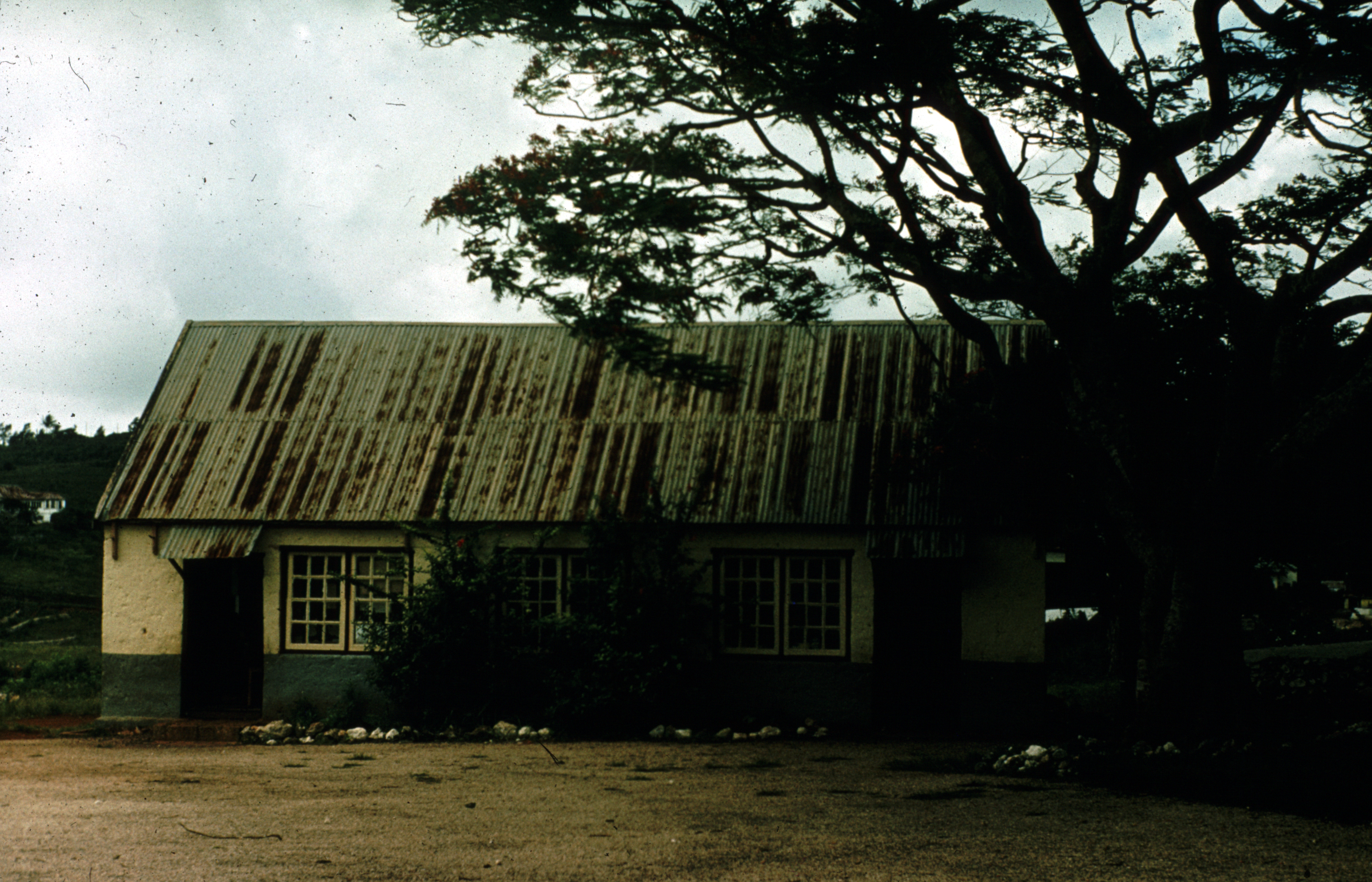
Bethabara junior school, 1960s.

The original infant school was to the left at the rear of the church with the junior school to the church's front right. Since these photographs were taken the infant building has been abandoned and the junior building replaced with a much larger structure.

=== Moravian Deaconess House ===
Opened on 1971-07-28 by Bishop Hastings.

== Burial ground ==
Adjacent to the church is a large and well used God's Acre of about 5000m^{2}.

== Ministry ==
Several Bethabara men went on to serve as Ministers of the Moravian Church including S J Swaby, Trevor Dawkins, Livingstone and Paul Thompson (brothers) and Robert Cuthbert who entered the ministry while his father was serving Bethabara.

S J Swaby, Robert Cuthbert, Livingstone Thompson and Paul Thompson have served the PEC as Secretary, President and Secretary.

Vivian Moses was consecrated as a bishop while serving in North America.

== Ministers ==
1842	James Spence
1853	John Seiler
1863	Emanuel Weiss
1868	Joseph T Zom
1876	Fred Moderan
1883	Frank P Wilde
1932	Cyril H Edwards
1945	Charles F Smith
1946	Roderic J Flemming (assistant Vincent I Peart)
1950	Lloyd G McNamee
1951	Horace T Cuthbert
1962	Fred Linyard
1965	Robert G Foster
1978	Basil L MacLeavy
1983	Rupert G Clarke
1992	Nigel St. A Powell
1995	Guy Roberts
1996	Phyllis Smith-Seymour
2006	Jermaine Gibson
2011	Kevin Marshall
2014	Barrington Daley

F P Wilde's 48 years at Bethabara (and one year elsewhere) remains the longest service in Jamaica by a Moravian minister.

== Bibliography ==
- Buchner, J H (1854), The Moravians in Jamaica, History of the mission of the United Bretheren's Church to the Negroes of Jamaica from the year 1754 to 1854, Longman Brown and Company.
- Hastings, S U & MacLeavy, B L (1979), Seedtime and Harvest (A Brief History of the Moravian Church in Jamaica 1754-1979), The Moravian Church Corporation.
- Spence, Travert (2000), A Brief History of Bethabara (included in the souvenir program for the congregation's 160th anniversary), Newport, Jamaica: Bethabara Moravian Church.
