= Neville Neil =

Bishop of Church in Jamaica

- Born: 17 March 1917; Dunder Hill, St Elizabeth, Jamaica, British Empire
- Died: 22 May 2009 (aged 92)
- Resting place: Bethabara Moravian Church; 17.9647109°N 77.5075686°W
- Occupation: Bishop
- Known for: Jamaican bishop of the Moravian Church (1983).

Neville Sylvester Neil (17 March 1917 – 22 May 2009) was a bishop of the Moravian Church in Jamaica.

== Biography ==
Bishop Neil was born in Dunder Hill, a village in St Elizabeth, Jamaica. He attended school first at Lititz Elementary School and then St Andrew Tutorial College. His theological training was at St Colme's (then in Kingston), from where he graduated in 1944.

He served the Moravian Church in Jamaica for more than 50 years, first as a clergy man and from 1983 as a bishop. He retired in 1993. The congregations for which he was responsible during those years include Redeemer and New Beulah.

He was married with children, one of whom is also a Moravian Church clergyman.

Bishop Neil is buried at Bethabara Moravian Church (aerial view).
