= Karl W. Reid =

American writer and engineer

- Education: Massachusetts Institute of Technology (BS); Harvard University (MS, PhD)
- Scientific career
- Institutions: Massachusetts Institute of Technology; National Society of Black Engineers; United Negro College Fund; Northeastern University
- Thesis: Black Gold: Understanding the Relationships between Racial Identity, Self-Efficacy, Institutional Integration and Academic Achievement of Black Males in Research Universities (2007)

Karl W. Reid (born in 1963) is an American writer and engineer, and the first Chief Inclusion Officer of Northeastern University after serving as the longtime chief executive officer of the National Society of Black Engineers. Dr. Reid previously worked on new program development at the United Negro College Fund, as Associate Dean of Undergraduate Education at Massachusetts Institute of Technology, and in various roles at IBM.

== Early life and education ==
Reid was born in the Bronx and grew up in Roosevelt, New York. His parents were committed to his education and Reid attended a magnet school. He was an undergraduate student at Massachusetts Institute of Technology, where he studied materials science and was a Tau Beta Pi scholar. He was a member of the National Society of Black Engineers whilst at MIT. He joined as a freshman and was elected National Chairperson in 1984. After graduating with a master's degree in 1985, Reid joined IBM where he worked in product management and consulting.

== Research and career ==
After reading Jonathan Kozol's book Savage Inequalities Reid was inspired to bring positive change through education. After twelve years in the computer industry Reid returned to his alma mater, working on education programs for underserved communities in the United States. Whist working at MIT Reid completed a doctorate degree at Harvard University that looked at the relationship between race, identity and academic attainment. He was made head of the Office of Minority Education at MIT and also served as Associate Dean of Undergraduate Education.

Reid wanted to work on project at a national scale, so moved to the United Negro College Fund (UNCF). At UNCF he controlled the development of new programs as Vice President of Research and Innovation. The United Negro College Fund supports the United States' 37 historically black colleges and universities.

As of 2014, Reid has served as executive director of the National Society of Black Engineers (NSBE). At NSBE Reid works to end the underrepresentation of black people in engineering courses. He was awarded the Presidential Award for Excellence in Science, Mathematics, and Engineering Mentoring in 2003. He hopes that there will be 10,000 black undergraduate engineers in the United States by 2025. He established the 50K coalition, a collaborative of the NSBE, the American Indian Science and Engineering Society, the Society of Hispanic Professional Engineers and the Society of Women Engineers, that looks to end the underrepresentation of minority students in engineering.

=== Awards and honours ===
In 2018 Reid was awarded the Transformer Award from the Black Alumni of MIT. He was also awarded the American Association of Engineering Societies Kenneth Andrew Roe Award, which recognises efforts to promote unity between engineering societies.
