= Diola Bagayoko =

Malian-American professor of physics

- Born: December 12, 1948 (age 77); Bamako, Mali
- Education: BS, Ecole Normale Superieure; MS, Lehigh University; PhD, Louisiana State University
- Occupations: Physicist and Academic
- Partner: Ella Kelley

Diola Bagayoko is a Malian-American professor of physics at Southern University in Baton Rouge, Louisiana.

== Early life and education ==
Bagayoko grew up in Mali, West Africa.

In 1973, Bagayoko earned degrees in chemistry and physics from Ecole Normale Superieure in Barnako, Mali. He then earned a master's degree in solid state physics from Lehigh University.

Bagayoko earned his Ph.D. in theoretical solid state physics from Louisiana State University in Baton Rouge, Louisiana.

== Career ==
In 1990, Bagayoko started the Timbuktu Academy in Baton Rouge. The academy hosts STEM-based summer programs for middle school and high school students mostly from underrepresented communities in science.

Bagayoko's mentoring model consists of student-centric goals like fostering confidence, involving students in research, and monitoring them. He has attributed his passion for mentoring to his teachers in Bamako. Bagayoko uses the power law of human performance and his belief that scientific knowledge is acquired cumulatively to push students away from self-doubt.

Bagayoko has over 220 scholarly publications ranging multiple subjects. Bagayoko published on mentoring topics over 50 times, and he has published on various condensed matter theories over 80 times.

Bagayoko taught courses in introductory and mathematical physics, as well as classical, relativistic, and quantum mechanics in the United States and abroad.

At the Southern University at Baton Rouge, Bagayoko is a Southern University System Distinguished Professor and the chair of the Department of Physics. He acted as the chair of the Department of physics from 2009 to 2012 and then became the chair of Mathematics and Physics from 2012 to 2015.

Outside of academia, Bagayoko has consulted for organizations such as the Southern Regional Education Board and the United Nations Education, Scientific, and Cultural Organization.

== Awards ==
In 1996, Bagayoko was given one of the first Presidential Award for Excellence in Science, Mathematics and Engineering Mentoring. In 2009, Bagayoko was awarded the AAAS Mentor Award for Lifetime Achievement. He was named a Fellow of the American Physical Society (APS) in 2018, after a nomination from the APS Forum on Education, "for improving undergraduate physics education for all students through curriculum development, program development and administrative leadership, and broadening participation in physics through the preparation and mentorship of numerous ethnic/racial minorities in physics".
