= Winston A. Anderson =

Jamaican-American biologist

- Born: 1940 (age 85–86); Kingston, Jamaica
- Education: Howard University
- Known for: Founding the Sandy Spring Slave Museum
- Awards: Presidential Award for Excellence in Science, Mathematics, and Engineering Mentoring (2011)
- Scientific career
- Fields: Biology
- Workplaces: Howard University

Winston A. Anderson is a Jamaican-born biology professor at Howard University. In 1988 he founded the Sandy Spring Slave Museum & African Art Gallery in Sandy Spring, Maryland. In 2011, President Barack Obama awarded Anderson the Presidential Award for Excellence in Science, Mathematics, and Engineering Mentoring.

== Early life and education ==
Winston was born on July 26, 1940, in Kingston, Jamaica. In Jamaica, Winston received his Higher Schools Certificate from Calabar High School. He then attended Howard University in Washington D.C. He earned his Bachelor of Science in zoology in 1962, and a Master of Science degree in 1963. He went on to receive his Ph.D. degree in biomedical sciences from Brown University in 1966.

== Career and research ==
After receiving his Ph.D., Winston went on to teach at the Pritzker School of Medicine. He then went on to teach at Howard University, where he served as chair of the Department of Zoology from 1975 to 1983.

In 1980, at the American Society for Cell Biology (ASCB) annual meeting, Winston met with the president of the ASCB to discuss how to increase the number of minority members. From this meeting, the Minority Affairs Committee was started and Winston provided funds from his grant at Howard University.

In 2006, he was awarded a $1 million grant from Howard Hughes Medical Institute. With this grant he set up a program to award $6,000 scholarships to Howard University science students, and assign the students to mentors to improve their skills and enable them to attend "any academic program they want".

In 2011, President Barack Obama announced Winston was of the nine recipients of the Presidential Award for Excellence in Science, Mathematics and Engineering Mentoring. Winston was invited to the White House to accept his award. He also received $25,000 from the National Science Foundation to aid in his mentoring programs.

== Sandy Spring Slave Museum ==
The George and Georgianna Campbell Sandy Spring Slave Museum & African Art Gallery was founded in 1988. Winston and his older brother, Bernard, bought the land in Sandy Spring, Maryland. Sandy Spring was a free black community in Maryland, where it was a stop on the Underground Railroad. The museum took around 4 years to build and has approximately 3,000 visitors a year. The museum also provides the Dr. Winston Anderson Legacy Scholarship to students from the Sandy Spring area planning on attending college, university, vocational or business school.

== Awards and honors ==
- Anne Langer Award for Cancer Research, Pritzker School of Medicine (1975)
- Distinguished Teacher Award, Pritzker School of Medicine (1975)
- Biomedical Research and Service Award, Morehouse College (1998)
- Presidential Award for Excellence in Science, Mathematics and Engineering Mentoring (2011)
- Living Legend Award, Montgomery County (2019)
- Roscoe R. Nix Distinguished Community Service Award (2020)

== Personal life ==
Winston lives in Silver Spring, Maryland with his wife Carol Anderson. They have three children, Laura, Lea, and Michael.
