= Barbara Blake Hannah =

Jamaican author and journalist (born 1941)

- Born: 5 June 1941 (age 84); Colony of Jamaica, British Empire
- Other names: Barbara Makeda Blake-Hannah; Barbara Blake
- Occupations: Journalist, author, filmmaker, politician
- Known for: One of the first black on-camera reporters on British TV

Barbara Makeda Blake-Hannah (born 5 June 1941) is a Jamaican author and journalist known for her promotion of Rastafari culture and history. She is also a politician, filmmaker, festival organiser and cultural consultant. She was one of the first black people to be an on-camera reporter and interviewer on British television (Note: Eric Anthony Abrahams worked for the BBC in this role from 1965) when, in 1968, she was employed by Thames Television's evening news programme Today. Hannah was sacked because viewers complained about having a black woman on screen. She later returned to Jamaica and was an independent senator in the Parliament of Jamaica from 1984 to 1987.

== Early life and father ==
In Jamaica, Blake-Hannah had read television news bulletins and had written for a monthly news magazine managed by her father, Evon Blake, who founded the Press Association of Jamaica.

== TV and journalism career in Britain ==
She arrived in Britain in 1964 to work as an extra on the film A High Wind in Jamaica (1965). In the next few years, she wrote for The Caribbean Times, West Indian World, The Sunday Times, Queen and Cosmopolitan. Blake-Hannah was appointed in 1968 as a reporter on Thames Television's Today, at the time presented by Eamonn Andrews, in which role she interviewed prime minister Harold Wilson and actor Michael Caine.

After nine months, she was dismissed without formal explanation, although her producer said the company was under pressure from a negative response from viewers for them having a black woman on television, and said that the station had had calls from viewers, telling them to "get the Nigger off the screen". Blake-Hannah then worked for the local news programme broadcast by ATV in Birmingham. She was unable to find a hotel that would allow her to stay, and had to commute from London each day until she found a room at the YWCA. She was deliberately kept away from the studio on a day when Enoch Powell was being interviewed. Following this, she worked as a researcher on the BBC's documentary series Man Alive.

== Return to Jamaica ==
Chris Blackwell and Perry Henzell offered her a job in 1972 as public relations officer for The Harder They Come, the first Jamaican feature film. She returned home permanently to Jamaica. Here Blake-Hannah had a successful career as a film-maker and has also been an independent senator in the Parliament of Jamaica from 1984 to 1987. Thus, Blake-Hannah also became the first Rastafarian representative in the parliament.

She has written several books, including a 1981 account of the Rastafarian religion (Rastafari – The New Creation, "the first book on the religion written by a practising member"), and produced several more films, including a documentary for Britain's Channel 4, Race, Rhetoric, Rastafari (1982). Blake-Hannah's 1982 memoir Growing Out: Black Hair and Black Pride in the Swinging Sixties charts her life and career in Britain.

Her son, Makonnen David Blake Hannah, was appointed in 1998, aged 13, as a youth technology consultant by Phillip Paulwell, then Minister of Commerce and Technology, and was the youngest consultant ever appointed by the Jamaican government.

Known for her promotion of Rastafari culture and history, she currently serves as executive director of the Jamaica Film Academy, which organises the Reggae Film Festival.

In April 2020, Blake-Hannah gave an interview to Bryan Knight's Tell A Friend podcast, where she candidly spoke about her experience working in Britain. She spoke of the racism prevalent at the time and her journey to black consciousness.

The British media periodical Press Gazette launched the "Barbara Blake-Hannah Prize" in 2020 to recognise emerging talented journalists from minority backgrounds.

She has been active in the call for reparations for slavery. In 2001, she established the Jamaica Reparations Movement after returning from the UN-backed World Conference Against Racism where the issue of reparations had been debated. However, in 2022, she said: "After seven years of trying to drum up support for the J.A.R.M. [Jamaican Reparations Movement], ...I handed the work over to the government. Twenty years later, hardly one of the UN’s 19 Forms of Reparations have been implemented by any country, least of all Britain."

In 2025, Blake Hannah's life was covered in a podcast series called Hidden Histories, which is about Black women who had been somewhat forgotten.

== Bibliography ==
- Rastafari – The New Creation (1981), 2012
- Joseph – A Rasta Reggae Fable (2001), 2013
- The Moon Has its Secrets: A novel, 2014
- Growing Out: Black Hair & Black Pride In The Swinging Sixties (2010), 2016
- Home The First School: A Home-Schooling Guide To Early Childhood (2009), 2019
- Growing Up – Dawta of Jah, 2020
