= Moravian Church Foundation =

Non-profit foundation

The Moravian Church Foundation is a non-profit foundation connected with the Moravian Church. Its head office is in Amsterdam.

== History ==
The foundation traces its roots to 1754 when two tailors were sent to Suriname as unsupported missionaries. To earn a living, they practiced their craft, using their free time for their missionary work.

The business activities of C. Kersten & Co prospered and became one of Suriname's largest commercial enterprises, generating employment and profits.

The profits were used to establish other Moravian Church businesses in the Caribbean and Europe. All the businesses were eventually transferred to the Moravian Church Foundation and are now used to finance church work and social and community projects on several continents.

== Currently ==
The Unity Synod has resolved that the following be supported in order of priority:

- Theological training.
- The Moravian Church in Suriname for economic, educational and social work.
- The Unity Archives in Herrnhut, an annual grant.
- The church's work in South Asia, the Star Mountain Rehabilitation Centre and the Unity Fund.
- Other projects, at the discretion of the Unity Board.

The foundation is staffed and run by professional business and finance people. Its board of directors must include four elected from the church's provinces and who are particularly concerned with the ethical conduct of the foundation's businesses and its social responsibility to the communities in which it operates.
