= Abraham Hodgson =

Merchant, planter and slave owner in Jamaica

Abraham Hodgson (1765 - 11 April 1837) was a merchant, planter, and slave owner in Jamaica. He was elected to the House of Assembly of Jamaica in 1820.
