= Roxroy Salmon =

Jamaican-American immigration and human rights activist

Roxroy Salmon (born June 1, 1956, in Jamaica) is a Jamaican American immigration and human rights activist living in Brooklyn, New York. His critiques of United States immigration policy and resistance to deportation proceedings by U.S. Immigration and Customs Enforcement have been widely publicized in newspaper articles and a forthcoming documentary film.

== Immigration Case ==
Salmon arrived undocumented in the United States in 1977. In his first two years in the country he was charged with minor drug offences, given a conditional discharge and charged with disorderly conduct. In 1989, Salmon pleaded guilty to drug possession and the sale of narcotics. Salmon has four U.S.-born children and one U.S.-born grandchild. In 2001, Salmon's mother (a U.S. citizen) petitioned for his citizenship, but in 2007 Salmon received a notice to appear in immigration court due to his past convictions. Immigration laws passed in 1996 made crimes, including drug offenses, an automatic reason for deportation for immigrants and curtailed the immigration judges’ discretion to take other factors, such as family ties, into account. Salmon has been a frequent critic of this legislation, and advocates passage of the Child Citizen Protection Act (H.R. 182) to restore judges' discretion in cases involving U.S. citizen children.

Salmon has applied for discretionary relief called deferred action, in which ICE deprioritizes the enforcement of immigration laws effectively allowing them to stay in this country indefinitely until ICE enforces the deportation order. Since Thanksgiving, 2008, Salmon's supporters have been collecting petitions and letters of support from college students, community members, school children, religious leaders and elected officials. More than 800 people have signed petitions pledging their support of Mr. Salmon's family, and dozens of letters have been sent to ICE Field Director Chris Shanahan, including a letter from Congressman Edolphus Towns. Organisations including Families for Freedom and the New Sanctuary Movement are working to keep Salmon with his family in the US, along with other families in similar situations.

Roxroy is featured in Busted Borders, a video immigration blog on BustedHalo.com, August 12, 2009.

== Documentary ==
Salmon is the subject of a documentary film by Zach Fox entitled Roxroy, which premiered Tuesday, May 26, 2009, at the New School Graduate Film Festival.
