= Ian McKnight =

Jamaican activist

Ian McKnight is an HIV/AIDS activist from Jamaica.

== Education ==
McKnight attended the University of the West Indies where he attained a Bachelor in Theology and a master's in communication for social and behaviour. McKnight also holds a master's in human resource management from Nova Southeastern University.

== Career ==
In 1991, Ian McKnight and several friends co-founded Jamaica AIDS Support for Life (JASL), the first and largest AIDS service organization in Jamaica. Over the next 20 years, McKnight held several positions at JASL, including Executive Director. In 2010, he praised the US government for ending its travel ban on people living with HIV/AIDS. In 2011, he called on the Jamaican government to increase funding for housing programs for gay men living with HIV.

From 2006-2013, he also worked at the Caribbean Vulnerable Communities Coalition (CVC), a coalition of community organizations that does HIV advocacy work for marginalized populations in the Caribbean. In 2011, he spoke against David Cameron's threat to cut funding for HIV/AIDS services if Jamaica did not repeal its anti-gay laws. While serving as Executive Director of CVC, he spoke at the closing session of the 2012 International AIDS Conference in Washington, DC. McKnight critiqued the conference for "tokenism" and "half-baked" attempts to include sex workers and drug users at the conference. He also warned against potential HIV/AIDS funding cuts to the Caribbean and called for governments "to make the investment necessary [...] to end AIDS".

For several years, he served as Chief of Party for USAID COMET II, a community development program. Under his leadership, COMET II invested in local projects such as a community journalism training program and a business training for a group of young artists.

As of 2024, he is the Director of Programs and Services at the Toronto People With AIDS Foundation (PWA).

== LGBTQ Activism ==
McKnight has spoken about the dangers facing the LGBTQ community in Jamaica and the Caribbean. He has stated: "Jamaican LGBT individuals have to be constantly careful of how they live and how they manifest their sexuality." In 2003, he contributed to a report about discrimination against the LGBTQ community in Jamaica. He has spoken about how homophobic laws and stigma hinder HIV/AIDS service provision in Jamaica. In 2012, McKnight participated in a legal case against Jamaica for its laws prohibiting gay sex.

== Producer Work ==
McKnight has also been the Producer and Executive Producer of a number of documentaries on issues of social justice and human rights for marginalised communities in the Caribbean. These include "The Cost of Hate: How Homophobia Fuels HIV" (2011), "My Body My Business" (2010), "Complex Problems: Simple Solutions" (2007), "Take a Stand: Jamaican Civil Society organises for Health" (2009), and "A Right to be: Sex Worker access to health care in the Caribbean" (2009).

== Awards ==
- Gleaner Honour Award for Health & Wellness (2004) for his work with Jamaica AIDS Support for Life
- University of Technology Ubuntu Award (2014)
