= Evon Blake =

Jamaican journalist

Eyrell Blake, known as Evon Blake (7 February 1906 – 7 November 1988), was a Jamaican journalist who challenged the racial status quo in colonial Jamaica. Born in Salem, in Clarendon Parish to Cottilda and Joseph Blake, a farmer, he studied journalism in Panama. He gained a PhD from a university in Pennsylvania.

From 1928 to 1933, Blake worked in Panama, before returning to Jamaica where he established his reputation as a journalist, first for the Gleaner Company, and then for the Jamaica Standard and the Jamaica Times. In 1940, Blake established the Spotlight News Magazine, for which he served as editor for more than 16 years. In 1956, he launched the Newday News Magazine, which he ran until he retired in 1963.

In 1948, Blake took a swim in the pool at Myrtle Bank Hotel, which was then reserved only for white guests. This act created a controversy which eventually undermined the racial barriers at the hotel.

Blake died in the University Hospital, Kingston in November 1988. One of his daughters is the broadcaster and Rastafarian advocate Barbara Blake Hannah.
