= Norma Shirley =

Jamaican chef

Norma Shirley (August 13, 1938 – November 1, 2010) was a Jamaican chef who won many culinary awards including the Prime Minister's Award for culinary excellence. One of her restaurants Norma's on the Terrace was named one of the 60 Best Restaurants in the World by Condé Nast Traveler.

== Early life and education ==
Norma Shirley was born as Norma Elise Smith on 1938 in Saint James Parish, Jamaica. Shirley was trained as a nurse and worked at the University of the West Indies Medical School. Shirley started cooking while she lived in Scotland, having been motivated by her lack of interest in regional food. Shirley moved to Stockbridge, Massachusetts in 1976. While she continued to work as a nurse, she also prepared picnic baskets for people who wanted to have a meal to travel.

She then moved to New York city where she worked as a food stylist for Condé Nast. In 1985 she moved back to Jamaica and ultimately opened multiple restaurants on the island. During this time, Vogue magazine called her "the Julia Child of Jamaica". She also ran a cooking school in Jamaica.

Shirley also opened a restaurant in Miami, Florida, and in 1995 the James Beard Foundation asked Shirley to present a Jamaican meal, the first one hosted by the foundation.

== Honors and awards ==
Shirley's restaurant Norma's on the Terrace was lauded by Condé Nast Traveler as one of the top restaurants in the world.
