= Presidential Award for Excellence in Science, Mathematics, and Engineering Mentoring =

American mentoring award

The Presidential Award for Excellence in Science, Mathematics and Engineering Mentoring (PAESMEM) is a Presidential award established by the United States White House in 1995. The program is administered by the National Science Foundation (NSF) on behalf of the White House Office of Science and Technology Policy (OSTP) to reward outstanding mentoring by individuals and organizations. PAESMEM is the highest national mentoring award bestowed by the White House.

== A Few Selected Recipients ==
- 1996 – Richard A. Tapia, Diola Bagayoko
- 1997 – Geraldine L. Richmond
- 1998 – Nina Roscher, Armando A. Rodriguez
- 2000 – Maria Elena Zavala
- 2003 –
  - Individual – Linda B. Hayden, Margaret Werner-Washburne
  - Organisation – Karl W. Reid (National Society of Black Engineers)
- 2004 -
  - Organization - Society for Advancement of Chicanos and Native Americans in Science
- 2005 – Lenore Blum, Rosemary Gillespie, Cheryl B. Schrader
- 2007
  - Individual – Jerzy Leszczynski, Kennedy Reed, Kenneth Sajwan, Laura Bottomley, Lesia Crumpton-Young, Mary Anne Nelson, Patricia DeLeon, Steven Oppenheimer
  - Organisation – Medeva Ghee (The Leadership Alliance & The Partnership for Minority Science Education)
- 2008 – Richard Zare, Susan M. Kauzlarich
- 2009 – Maja Matarić
- 2011 – Winston Anderson, Juan E. Gilbert, Jo Handelsman, Mary Lou Soffa
- 2014 – Erika Tatiana Camacho, Keivan Stassun
- 2015
  - Organisation – EDGE Foundation, received by Ulrica Wilson
- 2018 - Elba Serrano
- 2020 - Overtoun Jenda

Full list of awardees, both individuals and organizations, can be found at . The year given above represents the year of the award competition although often the ceremony to receive the award occurred 2-3 years later.

== STEM mentoring ==
Mentoring in the STEM fields has been shown to assist with student retention, a significant problem in the STEM pipeline.
