= Jean Springer =

Jamaican academic

Jean Springer (born 12 September 1939)is a Jamaican academic who spent most of her career in Canada, serving as a professor of mathematics at Mount Royal University in Calgary, Alberta, and specializing in abstract algebra.

== Life ==
Springer was born in Kingston, Jamaica, to parents who were mathematics and physics schoolteachers. She was home-schooled from the age of two until six then attended Wolmer's High School for Girls, and then went on to the University of West Indies at Mona. She initially began studying medicine, but later switched courses and graduated with a B.Sc. in mathematics and physics, achieving "Student of the Year"

Springer married a Trinidadian engineer and was mother to three children.

== Career ==
Springer initially worked in Trinidad as a science teacher at Naparima College and Point Fortin College. She and her husband later moved to Vancouver, Canada, where he studied engineering at the University of British Columbia and she completed an M.Sc. at Simon Fraser University. They eventually settled in Calgary, where Springer completed a doctorate in pure mathematics at the University of Calgary. Her dissertation, supervised by W. Keith Nicholson, was Commutativity and Characterisation of certain Rings with Solvable, Hamiltonian or Abelian Groups of Units.

Springer was a lecturer at the University of Calgary and the Southern Alberta Institute of Technology before eventually settling in the Department of Mathematics, Physics and Engineering at Mount Royal University. She served for periods as head of department and dean of the Faculty of Science and Technology, and was also chair of the Alberta Women's Science Network. She retired as a professor emeritus.
