= Ras Droppa =

Ras Droppa (born Samuel Richards) is a reggae musician, who has been involved in making and spreading music for almost 30 years.

== Biography ==
Ras Droppa is one of 9 children born in Jamaica to shoemaker named Ellis Richards. Ellis taught his eight sons and one daughter to appreciate music and learn scales at an early age. The Richards children made up a successful band known throughout Jamaica as The Richards Brothers Band, and were featured on Jamaican television. Ras Droppa's musical talent earned him the role as band sergeant in school.

=== Influences ===
Ras Droppa's early influences were fellow Jamaican musicians Bob Marley, Aston "Family Man" Barrett, Garnett Silk, Sly Dunbar & Robbie Shakespeare (known as Sly and Robbie, Roland Alphonso and the Skatalites, and accomplished xylophonist and vibraphonist Lennie Hibbert who was Ras Droppa's music teacher.

=== Notable appearances ===
Ras Droppa has performed with successful reggae artists Sugar Minott, Beres Hammond, The Congos, Chaka Demus & Pliers, Lucky Dube, Burning Spear, Aswad, Sly and Robbie, Jimmy Cliff, Yami Bolo, Dennis Brown, The Wailers, Cannibus Cup, Leroy Sibbles and Jr. Jazz, and has toured extensively throughout the world with artists like Anthony B, the Mighty Diamonds, Cocoa Tea, Half Pint and Sister Carol.

Ras Droppa's music was featured in the independent film The Knee Shack.

Ras Droppa was featured in the June 2005 issue of Hi magazine.

In 2003 a state lottery cast Ras Droppa as a featured performer in a commercial to promote its "Winner Wonderland" campaign. The commercial involved a reggae version of the seasonal classic "Winter Wonderland" which Droppa performed.
