= Reggae Film Festival =

Annual event in Kingston, Jamaica

Jamaica International Reggae Film Festival
- Genre: Reggae, film
- Locations: Kingston, Jamaica
- Years active: 2008–present
- Website: Official Reggae Film Festival website

The Jamaica International Reggae Film Festival is a unique annual event which takes place in Kingston, Jamaica, first held in 2008 and held each year since then.

The Reggae Film Festival is coordinated by film maker and film festival organizer Barbara Blake Hannah, former Special Tasks Consultant to the Minister of Culture, in collaboration with Peter Gittins of Reggae Films UK, to give Jamaicans the opportunity to view some of the best of the hundreds of films made about and because of the world-famous music of Jamaica, that not only reflect the wide interest in Jamaican music, but also bring tourists on vacation and income to members of the entertainment fraternity, as well as the nation.

The Reggae Film Festival is intended as the foundation activity of a Jamaica Film Academy that will archive films for research, screening and education. The Jamaica Film Academy aims to preserve all moving images relating to Jamaica and its musical past.

The festival shows films relating to reggae that are made each year all over the globe, and is a place for reggae fans to come together each year to watch the latest reggae related films and a place for members of the film industry to link up with each other. International films on non-reggae topics are welcomed and shown annually.

== See also ==
- List of reggae festivals
- Reggae
