= S. U. Hastings =

Jamaican bishop of the Moravian Church

The Right Reverend S. U. Hastings CD
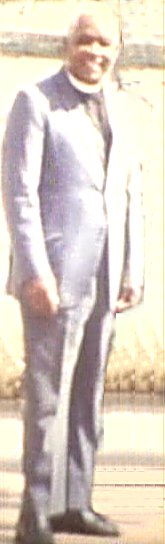
- Bishop Hastings at Christiana, Jamaica c. 1973
- Born: 26 September 1916; Darliston, Westmoreland, Jamaica, British Empire
- Died: 19 September 1991 (aged 74)
- Occupation: Bishop
- Known for: First Jamaican national consecrated as a bishop of the Moravian Church (1961).

Selvin Uriah Hastings CD (26 September 1916 – 19 September 1991) was the first Jamaican national consecrated as a bishop of the Moravian Church and the first Jamaican to be elected head of the Moravian Church Unity Board.

== Early life, education and ministry ==
Bishop Hastings was born in Darliston, Westmoreland, Jamaica. After attending local schools, he trained at St. Colme's Theological College, Kingston, and in the United Kingdom, before serving the Jamaica Province of the Moravian Church at Springfield in St. Elizabeth, Mizpah in Manchester and Church of the Redeemer and Trinity in Kingston.

He undertook further training in the United States, gaining a bachelor's degree from Butler University and a master's degree from the Union Theological Seminary.

== Leadership roles ==
He was elected to the Provincial Elders' Conference (PEC), the Executive Board of the Moravian Church in Jamaica, in 1951 where he served as president for many years.

He was consecrated as a Bishop in 1961.

He served on the board of the Moravian Church Foundation.

He was appointed as Jamaica's representative on the Executive Board of the Worldwide Moravian Church in 1967, where he served as chairman until 1974 and was General Director from 1972 to 1974.

He was twice president of the Jamaica Council of Churches, from 1960 to 1963 and again in 1971.

He was the first chairman of the board of governors of the United Theological College of the West Indies (UTCWI) where he also lectured in homiletics, church history and church administration.

== Publications ==
- These 50 Years (1991), a book of sermons.
- Seedtime and Harvest: A brief history of the Moravian Church in Jamaica, 1754-1979, volume of church denominational history.

== Honours ==
He was awarded the Doctor of Divinity degree by Moravian Theological Seminary (1990) and made a Commander of the Order of Distinction (1989).

== Private life ==
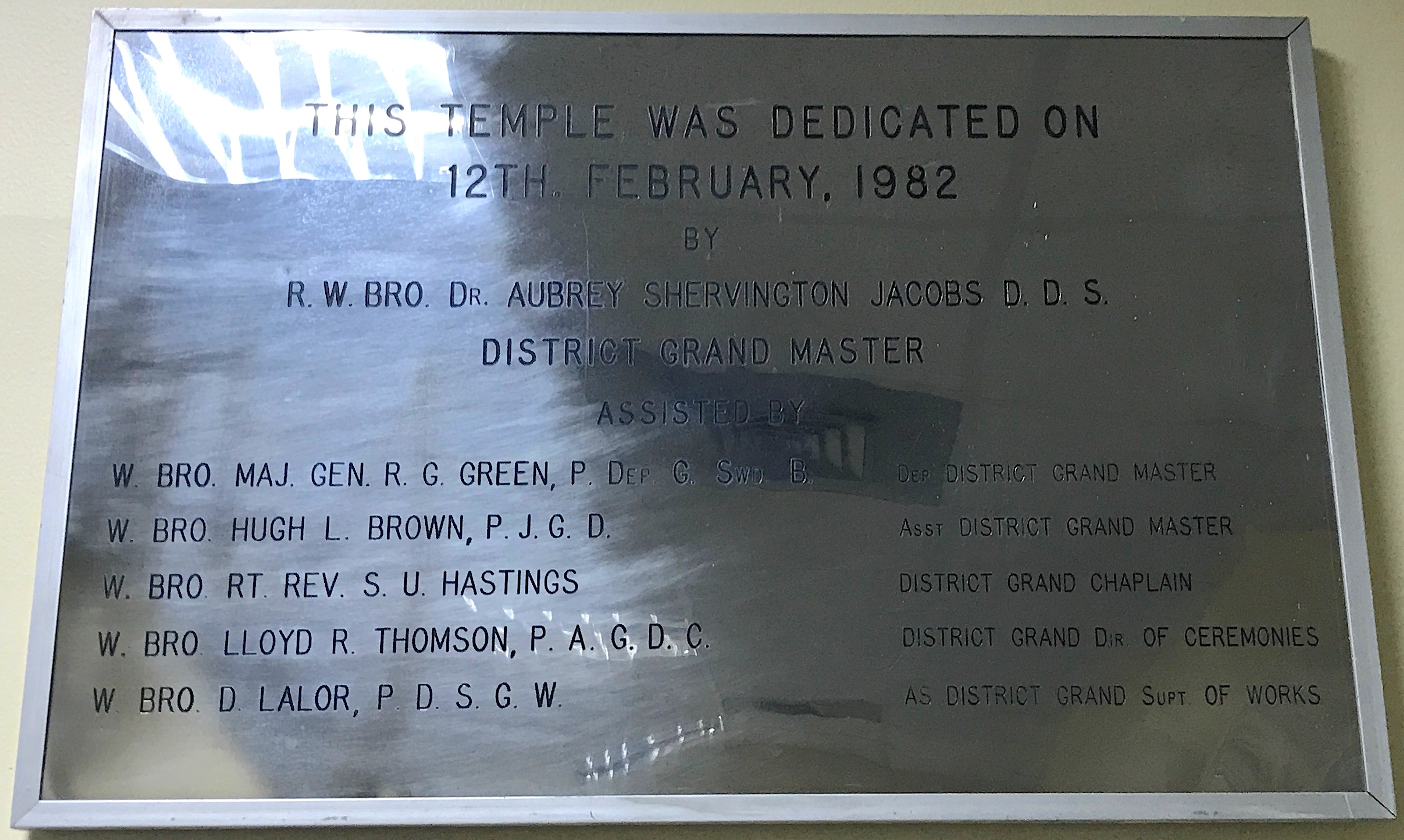
Commemorative plaque at the Masonic Temple in Barbados Avenue, Kingston, Jamaica.

Hastings was married to Pansy, and they had three children.

He was a Freemason, initiated in 1963 in Arawak Lodge No. 6902 (under the jurisdiction of the United Grand Lodge of England) in Kingston, Jamaica. He served as the District Grand Chaplain for the Masonic District of Jamaica and the Cayman Islands, and in that capacity he was the dedicating Grand Chaplain of the new Masonic temple in Barbados Avenue, Kingston, on 12 February 1982, assisting Dr Aubrey Jacobs and Major-General Rudolph Green.

== Legacy ==
The Moravian Church in Jamaica has established a foundation in his honour.

As part of the church's 250th anniversary celebrations in 2004, the Postal Corporation of Jamaica issued a commemorative stamp featuring Bishop Hastings.
