= Patricia DeLeon =

Jamaican reproductive geneticist (born 1944)

Patricia Anastastia De Leon nee Martin
- Born: 13 July 1944 (age 82); Port Maria
- Education: Excelsior High School; University of the West Indies; University of Western Ontario
- Scientific career
- Workplaces: University of Delaware; McGill University
- Thesis: Chromosome studies of rabbit blastocysts resulting from spermatazoa [sic] aged in vivo (1972)

Patricia Anastastia DeLeon née Martin (born 13 July 1944) is a Jamaican reproductive geneticist who is specialist in the male reproductive system. She is the Trustees Distinguished Professor of Biological Sciences at the University of Delaware. In 2010 she was awarded the Presidential Award for Excellence in Science, Mathematics, and Engineering Mentoring by Barack Obama.

== Early life and education ==
DeLeon was born in Port Maria. She was one of nine children, and had to lobby the principal of her high school, Excelsior High School, to waive the fees to allow her family to attend. She became interested in botany as a child and learnt the Latin names of all the plants that she collected. The principal agreed based on DeLeon's academic performance. She attended the University of the West Indies for her undergraduate studies, where she focussed on zoology and chemistry. After earning her undergraduate degree DeLeon moved to Canada, where she joined the University of Western Ontario for her doctoral degree in microscopic anatomy. She was subsequently a postdoc at McGill University.

== Research and career ==
In 1976 DeLeon joined the faculty at the University of Delaware. DeLeon has extensively studied the Sperm adhesion molecule 1 (SPAM1), a glycosylphosphatidylinositol linked membrane protein. The mechanisms that underpin the expression of these proteins are poorly understood, but are crucial for the development of assisted reproductive technology. The over-expression of SPAM1 can give rise to cancer. In 2009 she was named the Trustees Distinguished Professor of Biological Sciences. Alongside her work on male fertility, DeLeon has studied particles in the fallopian tube, the understanding of which may improve the outcomes of in vitro fertilisation. She is working on non-invasive diagnostic methods to identify embryos that are most likely to result in successful IVF.

Throughout her career DeLeon has worked to support undergraduates gain research experience.

== Awards and honours ==
- 2006 Elected to the Executive Council of the American Society of Andrology
- 2007 Presidential Award for Excellence in Science, Mathematics, and Engineering Mentoring
- 2010 William G. Demas Memorial Lecture
- 2011 Caribbean Women in Science Medalist
- 2012 50 Most Outstanding Jamaican Women
- 2017 Francis Alison Faculty Award

== Selected publications ==
- Martin-DeLeon, Patricia A. (2006). "Epididymal SPAM1 and its impact on sperm function". Molecular and Cellular Endocrinology. 250 (1–2): 114–121. doi:10.1016/j.mce.2005.12.033. ISSN 0303-7207. PMID 16420970. S2CID 25997623.
- Al-Dossary, Amal A.; Strehler, Emanuel E.; Martin-DeLeon, Patricia A. (2013-11-14). "Expression and Secretion of Plasma Membrane Ca2+-ATPase 4a (PMCA4a) during Murine Estrus: Association with Oviductal Exosomes and Uptake in Sperm". PLOS ONE. 8 (11) e80181. Bibcode:2013PLoSO...880181A. doi:10.1371/journal.pone.0080181. ISSN 1932-6203. PMC 3828235. PMID 24244642.
- Nigro, Janice M. Schweinfest, Clifford W. Rajkovic, Aleksandar Pavlovic, Jovan Jamal, Sumayah Dottin, Robert P. Hart, John T. Kamarck, Michael E. Rae, Peter M. M. Carty, Maynard D. Martin-Deleon, Patricia (1987). "cDNA cloning and mapping of the human creatine kinase M gene to 19q13". American Journal of Human Genetics. 40 (2): 115–25. OCLC 679561920. PMC 1684079. PMID 3031982.
