= Excelsior High School (Jamaica) =

- "Yet higher"

Location
- 137 Mountain View Avenue; Kingston; Jamaica; 17°59′29.45″N 76°45′58.01″W

Information
- School type: Secondary school
- Motto: Age Animo (Do It With Thy Might)
- Denomination: Methodist
- Founded: 1931
- Founder: Hon. Aston Wesley Powell
- Status: Co-educational
- Locale: St Andrew, Jamaica
- Sister school: Morant Bay High School
- Chairperson: Ms. Lilieth Deacon
- Principal: Mr. Deanroy Bromfield
- Chaplain: Rev. Dr. Phillip O'B. Robinson
- Staff: 100+
- Grades: 7 to 13
- Gender: Boys and girls
- Age range: 11 to 20
- Enrollment: 2000+
- Average class size: 45
- Classes offered: Business, Technical, Foreign languages, Sciences, Arts, Home Management, Mathematics, English Language, Religious Ed., Physical Education, Entrepreneurship, among others
- Hours in school day: 7:30 am - 3:00pm
- Campus type: Urban
- Houses: Cousins, Wint, Shirley, Whiteman, Powell, Sherlock,
- Colours: Green and Gold
- Song: "On Christ the sure foundation"
- Sports: Football, Netball, Hockey, Cricket, Baseball, Basketball, Swimming, Athletics, Softball, Table Tennis, Volleyball, Lacrosse
- Mascot: Eagle
- Nickname: "Agé" or "Ekkie"
- Feeder schools: Excelsior Primary School
- Website: www.excelsiorhighja.com

Excelsior High School is a co-educational high school for boys and girls between the ages of 11 and 20. The school was established in 1931 by the Hon. Dr. A. Wesley Powell, OD. It was previously located in Campbell Town and is now located in Kingston, Jamaica.

The school program includes academics, sports, and performing arts. Students who have gone on to become artists include Louise Bennett Coverly and Konshens. Students who have gone on to become professional sportsmen include the cricketers Courtney Walsh who was selected for the Jamaica national cricket team straight out of school, and Chris Gayle. The school is known for winning the Manning and Walker Cup more than once, and beating St George's College.

Other notable past Excelsorians include Cliff Hughes (OD), Owen "Blakka" Ellis, Claudette Pious, Hon. A. J. Nicholson, Hon. Phillip Paulwell and Hope Arthurine Anderson.

The school has a "green" program facilitated by a group of students in an environmental club who recycle plastic bottles and paper, interact with the agricultural science programme, plant and maintain grass and plants on the school grounds, and maintain a greenhouse.

== History ==
The school's auditorium was the venue for the fencing events at the 1966 British Empire and Commonwealth Games.
