= Hope Arthurine Anderson =

Jamaican chess champion

- Born: June 2, 1950; Port Antonio, Colony of Jamaica, British Empire
- Died: March 24, 2016 (aged 65)
- Occupation: Physician
- Known for: Chess champion

Hope Arthurine Anderson (June 2, 1950, in Port Antonio – March 24, 2016) was a Jamaican chess champion.

== Biography ==
Anderson was the sixth of eight children born to a policeman, Arthur, and a seamstress, Iris. She attended Titchfield High School in Port Antonio, and then Excelsior High School in Kingston where her teachers noted her facility with mathematics.

She also displayed a talent for music. She played the piano and was a voice student of Jamaican soprano Pauline Forrest-Watson. Anderson trained as a mezzo-soprano. She graduated from the Royal School of Music, Kingston. On a professional level however, she moved away from music and into the sciences, teaching math and chemistry. She went on to earn a master's in Computer Based Management Information Systems and become a physician. Later she was named an associate lecturer in the Department of Community Health & Psychiatry at the University of the West Indies.

=== Chess ===
Anderson began learning chess as a youngster and was one of the first members of the Jamaica Chess Federation, founded in 1969.

Of the first six Jamaican women's chess championships held (1973, 1976, 1982, 1983, 1984 and 1985), Anderson won all of them. She lost the 1986 championship to Claire Clarke, but won her seventh title a year later at the 1987 championship. In that same year she defeated the United General Classic Christine Bennet, who was also a very strong Jamaican player, in 64 moves. In 1989, she defeated Devlin Sinclair at the Jamaican championships.

At the Chess Olympiad in 1984 in Thessaloniki, Greece, Anderson led Jamaica’s women in their first Olympic experience. The Jamaican team, led by Anderson, went on to participate in the Olympic games three more times: 1986 in Dubai, U..A.E.; 1988 in Thessaloniki; 1990 in Novi Sad, (now Serbia). Anderson had her highest Elo rating of 2005 from January 1987 to July 1988.

=== Later years ===
For some time, she served as the managing director of the Jamaica Chess Federation and she also acted as team doctor during trips to competitions abroad. Although she stopped participating in chess tournaments after December 1996, her role as a mentor to younger enthusiasts was significant. She influenced many future chess champions from her country including Woman International Master (WIM) Deborah Richards-Porter, who won 10 consecutive Jamaican women's titles beginning in 2002.

Anderson died March 24, 2016, and her funeral in Kingston on April 6, 2016, was widely attended by family, friends, former national team colleagues and officials from the national chess association.
