= Jamaica Province of the Moravian Church =

Christian denomination in Jamaica

The Jamaica Province of the Moravian Church (formally The Moravian Church in Jamaica and the Cayman Islands) is part of the worldwide Moravian Church Unity.

== History ==
=== 1754–1809 The beginning ===
The work of the Moravian Church in Jamaica started with the arrival on 1754 -12-07 of missionaries Zecharias Caries, Thomas Shallcross and Gotlieb Haberecht from England at the invitation of the Foster and Barham families, owners of several plantations in St Elizabeth. They landed on the coast of St. Elizabeth, deliberately shunning the towns and opting to remain mostly in the rural areas to serve the large slave population. Their first base was on the Bogue estate.

During the first couple of years they had success in their work. Then, in 1755 Br Gottlieb Haberecht died and on 1756-12-24 his replacements Christian Rauch and ? Schulz arrived from America where Rauch had spent fifteen years working amongst Native Americans.

The new arrivals disagreed with Caries and Shallcross about the conditions to be met before a slave could be baptised. The disagreement lost them the respect of many and caused confusion amongst those awaiting baptism. As a result, numbers attending services started to fall and did not recover until 1764 when a Br Schlegel arrived. The revival continued until he died in 1770. Thereafter, little progress was made until 1809.

=== 1810–1854 growth ===
The work now prospered, particularly after the close of Old Carmel estate in 1823, with membership growing dramatically during apprenticeship (which started in 1834) and after emancipation on 1838-08-01.

By the centenary, membership had reached 13,129 including 4,249 communicants while there were 43 schools teaching 1,728 boys and 1,280 girls.

=== 1954–2007 Jamaicanisation ===
From the end of the 19th century, native Jamaicans began to be accepted into leadership positions in the church and in 1961, S U Hastings was consecrated as the first Jamaican bishop of the Moravian Church.

Following independence in 1962, and the resulting drive for Jamaicanisation throughout Jamaican society, full conversion to local leadership was gradually achieved, with the last British clergy departing in 19??.

Ordination of the First Female Minister, Rev. Penelope Morgan at Lititz Moravian on July 24,1988

The 250th anniversary was celebrated in 2004. As part of the celebrations the Jamaican Post Office issued a set of three stamps depicting pioneering Jamaican leaders of the church.

The current Bishops are the Rt. Rev Stanley G. Clarke Ep. Fr. and the Rt. Rev Devon O. Anglin Ep. Fr.

The Rev. Barrington E. Daley is the president of the PEC (the administrative body of the Moravian Church in Jamaica).

Rev. Dr. Paul Gardner former president (2005–2017) was elected president of the World-Wide Moravian Church in 2008 and became the second Jamaican to be so elected.

The Provincial Elders Conference include: President- Rev. Barrington Daley

Vice President and SDC Representative- Rev. Charmane Daley

Secretary and WDC Representative- Rev. Ockery Brown

Treasurer and Lay Member - Bro. Lowel Morgan

EDC Representative- Rev. Dr. Simon Jones

CDC Representative- Rev. Christopher Euphfa

Lay Member- Bro. Aaron Panther

Youth Representative - Bro. Dominic Blair

=== Legal standing ===
Marriages performed by Moravian ministers were legally recognised from 1835.

Full legal recognition dates from Law 10 of 1884 entitled The Corporation of the Church of The Unity of the Brethren (commonly called Moravians) in Jamaica.

=== Missionary mortality ===
During the first 100 years, 193 European brethren and sisters took part in the work in Jamaica. Of these, 64 died there, 98 returned home or went to serve in other islands and 31 were still in service at the centenary.

Of the 64 who died:

Years served	Died	Years served	Died	Years served	Died
drowned on the way to the island	1	5	5	11	1
less than 1 year	6	6	2	12	2
1	10	7	3	13	2
2	7	8	3	14	1
3	7	9	2	15	1
4	8	10	2	19	1

As can be seen, average life expectancy was low at the start of the work. It improved later as a side effect of moving the work to cool hilly areas which reduced the incidence of tropical diseases (yellow fever, malaria, typhoid). Nonetheless, many missionaries died from these diseases. One enduring consequence is that most congregations today are found in Westmoreland, St. Elizabeth and Manchester.

=== Construction ===
The first building used exclusively as a church was erected in 1820 at New Eden. Prior to that, services were held in the hall of the missionaries dwelling house or under trees. Another eleven followed over the next thirty years:

- 1826 Fairfield and first school near New Carmel.
- 1828 New Carmel 60'x35' and Irwin Hill.
- 1830 New Fulneck.
- 1834 New Bethlehem.
- 1835 Nazareth and New Hope (Parker's Bay).
- 1837 Beaufort.
- 1839 Lititz.
- 1841 Bethabara.
- 1847 Springfield.
- 1849 Bethany.
- 1895 Mizpah

Note: these are building dates, not start of work which was always earlier.

=== Free villages ===
Following emancipation, the church was involved in the setting up of Free Villages for the formerly enslaved, including one at Maidstone (Nazareth) in Manchester, and at Beeston Spring and Beaufort near Darliston in Westmoreland.

=== Education ===
The church has always considered education to be an important part of its mission and as a result established 46 schools and two colleges, including the Bethlehem Moravian College (1861). The first school, at Lititz, was also the first primary school of any kind in Jamaica.

=== Agriculture and public works ===
The Jamaica Agricultural Society, which was established in 1895, benefited significantly in its early years from the involvement of the church, especially at Bethany, Mizpah and Nazareth in Manchester and Springfield in St. Elizabeth. In particular, the Rev. George Lopp of Bethany, Manchester is credited with the introduction of the Irish potato to Jamaica in 1890.

Moravians were the first to establish a public water supply in St. Elizabeth and Manchester by erecting water storage tanks and associated catchment areas.

=== Old Carmel estate ===
In c1740, one of the missionaries to the island of St Thomas became ill with fever and had no one to nurse him. It was not possible to obtain free servants then (there were none) so his congregation, slaves themselves, collected money and bought a slave that they presented to their minister to nurse him. This set a precedent whereby it became common for Moravian missionaries in the west Indies to hold slaves as servants.

Accordingly, in 1755 the missionaries in Jamaica purchased (with the agreement of the directing board in Europe) a small estate of 700 acres (2.8 km^{2}) at New Carmel (now called Old Carmel) near the Bogue estate), and supported themselves in their missionary work by the labour of 30 or 40 slaves. As a result, their credibility amongst the slaves generally was low and their success in converting them to Christianity correspondingly low. The estate was sold in 1823 and the church headquarters moved to Fairfield.

== Organisation ==
External links in this section are to WikiMapia.

=== Headquarters ===
3 Hector Street, Kingston 5, Jamaica.

The headquarters site and building was bequeathed to the church by Mary Morris Knibb who founded the adjacent Morris Knibb Preparatory School.

=== Districts, circuits and congregations ===
The province is divided into four districts, with each having a minister who is a superintendent. Each superintendent serves on the seven-member executive board, which is completed by two laypersons and Dr. Gardner, who is president of the board which oversees the affairs of the province. There are 33 active ordained ministers in Jamaica, three in Cuba and two in the Cayman.

==== Western District ====
- Beaufort Circuit:
  - Ashton (17.987177°N 76.780787°W),
  - Beaufort (18.241325°N 77.96452°W),
  - Cain Curran,
  - Content (18.183922°N 77.933992°W),

Minister: Rev. Aldwayne Brooks

- Carmel Circuit:
  - Beersheba,
  - Carmel (18.16433°N 77.937843°W),
  - Kilmarnock.

Minister:

- New Irwin Circuit:
  - Albion,
  - New Irwin.
  - Rosemount

Minister: Rev. Ockery Brown

- Salem Circuit

Salem (18.146356°N 77.987866°W).

  - New Works

Content (18.183922°N 77.933992°W), Minister: Rev. Recardo Malcolm

New Hope Circuit:

  - New Hope (18.106794°N 77.980769°W),
  - Petersville,

Minister: Rev. Delwarren Palmer

- Springfield Circuit:
  - Claremont,
  - Gracefield,
  - Mount Olivet,
  - Springfield (18.173688°N 77.880052°W),
  - Tatewood.

Minister: Rev. Marvin Williams

  - Rosemount.
- Mission Work in Cuba:
  - Belen,
  - Christ King.

==== Central District Conference ====
- Bethlehem/Lititz Circuit:
  - Bethlehem (17.969599°N 77.69719°W),
  - Ballard's Valley,
  - Lititz (17.939853°N 77.585642°W).

Minister: Rev. Sacha Lambert

- Carisbrook Circuit:
  - Carisbrook
  - White Hill
  - Langton

Minister: Rev. Sharon Frith-Barrett

  - Merrywood, Lay Pastor, Bro. Wilburn Barton
- Holy Cross Circuit:
  - Holy Cross (18.042523°N 77.6941645°W),

Minister: Rt. Rev. Devon Anglin

- Goshen Circuit:
  - Goshen
  - Lacovia
  - Gracehill
  - New Eden

Minister: Rev. Barnaba Nyirenda

- New Fulneck Circuit:
  - Dober
  - Middle Quarters - Rev. Norma Smith (Supplementary),
  - New Fulneck
  - Faith

Minister: Rev. Efeso Sichinsambwe

- Ockbrook Circuit:
  - Dublin (18.246379°N 77.703021°W),Ockbrook (18.196545°N 77.700688°W),

Minister: Rev. Everton Smith

==== Eastern District ====
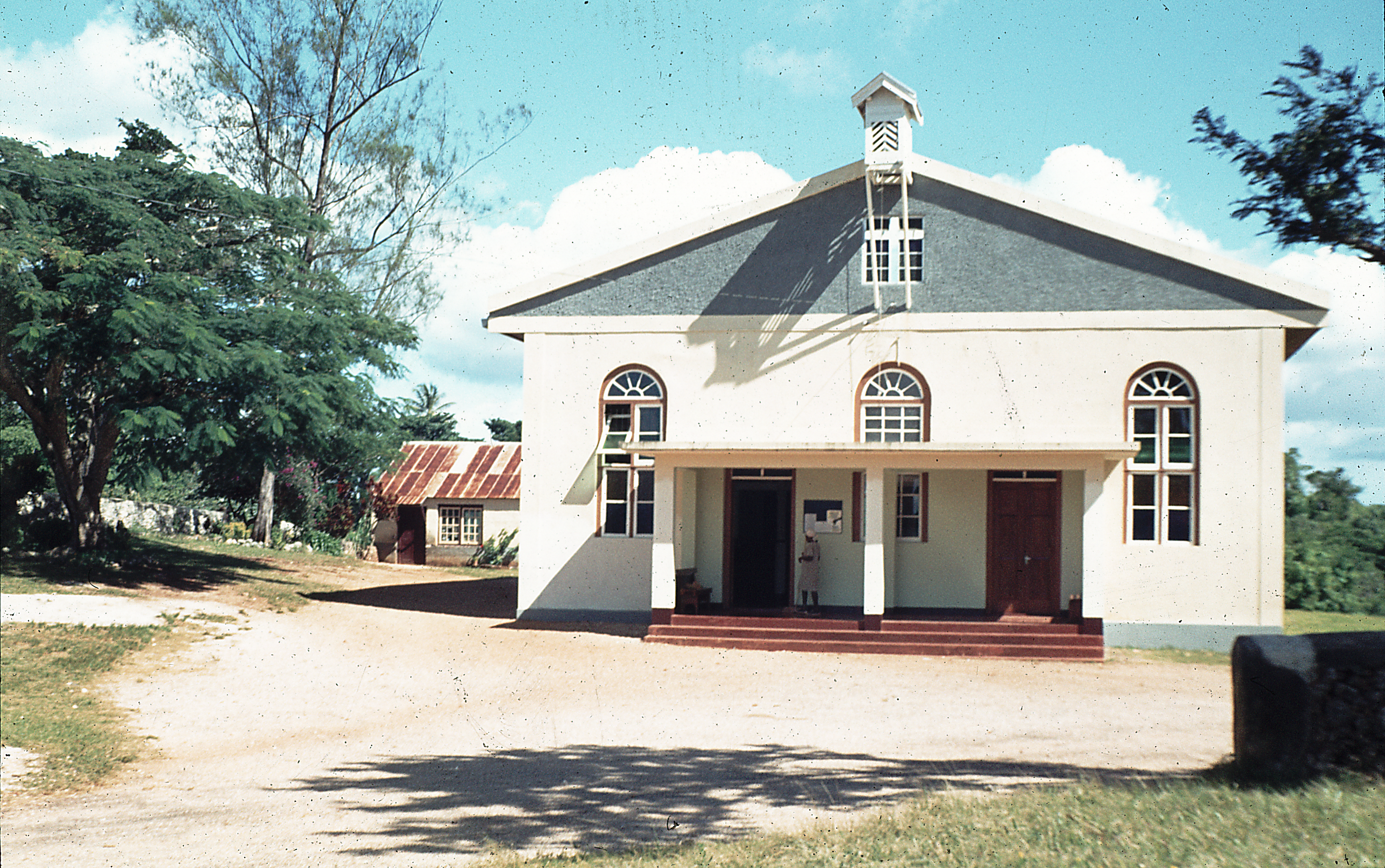
Bethabara Moravian Church, 1979.

- Bethabara Circuit:
  - Bethabara
  - Sharon
  - Patrick Town.

Minister: Rev. Paul Silwamba

- Bethany Circuit:
  - Bethany (18.153651°N 77.536805°W),
  - Mile Gully (18.136375°N 77.544277°W).

Minister: Rev. Sherol Watson

- Fairfield Circuit:
  - Fairfield (18.018763°N 77.57207°W),
  - Fairmount,
  - Montpelier,
  - Prince of Peace, Lay Pastor Sis Iredell Rattray

Minister: Rev. Simon Peter Jones

- Mizpah Circuit:

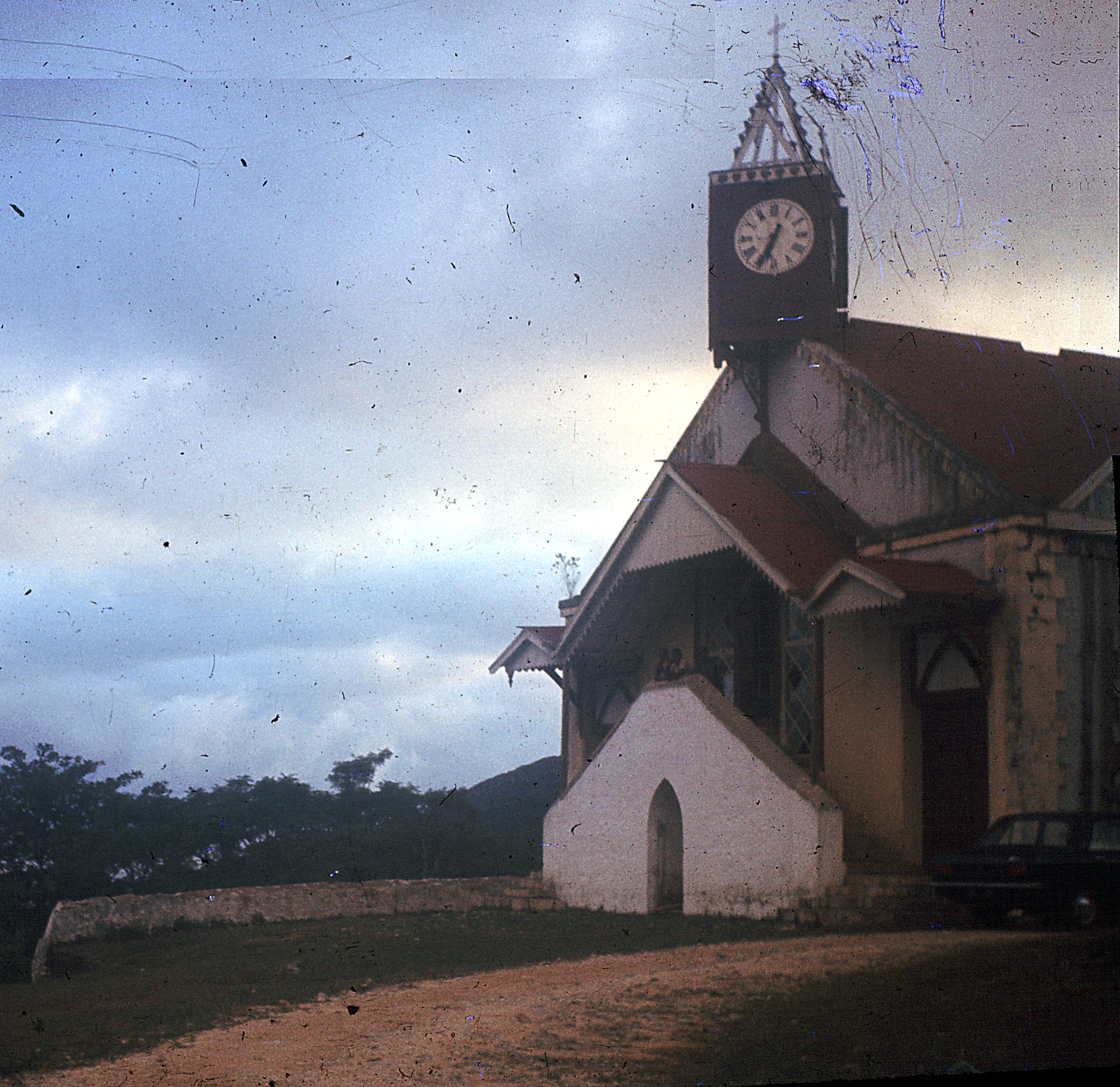
Mizpah Moravian Church

  - Mizpah (18.120867°N 77.482962°W)
  - Ritchies (18.139454°N 77.431126°W).

Minister: Rev. Ruth Stephenson

  - Moravia (18.190404°N 77.458302°W),
  - Top Hill

Minister: Rev. Delwarren Palmer

- Nazareth Circuit:
  - Nazareth (18.114009°N 77.58635°W)
  - Bath
  - Bethphage

Minister: Rev. Horatio Tomlinson

- New Beulah Circuit:
  - New Beulah. Constituted in 1963.
  - Broadleaf (18.045706°N 77.460893°W)

Minister: Rev. Christopher Euphfa

- Zorn Circuit:
  - Bohemia (18.215012°N 77.475012°W),
  - Zorn (18.175645°N 77.490912°W). Formerly Beulah.

Minister: Rev. Lovern Skeen

==== Surrey District ====
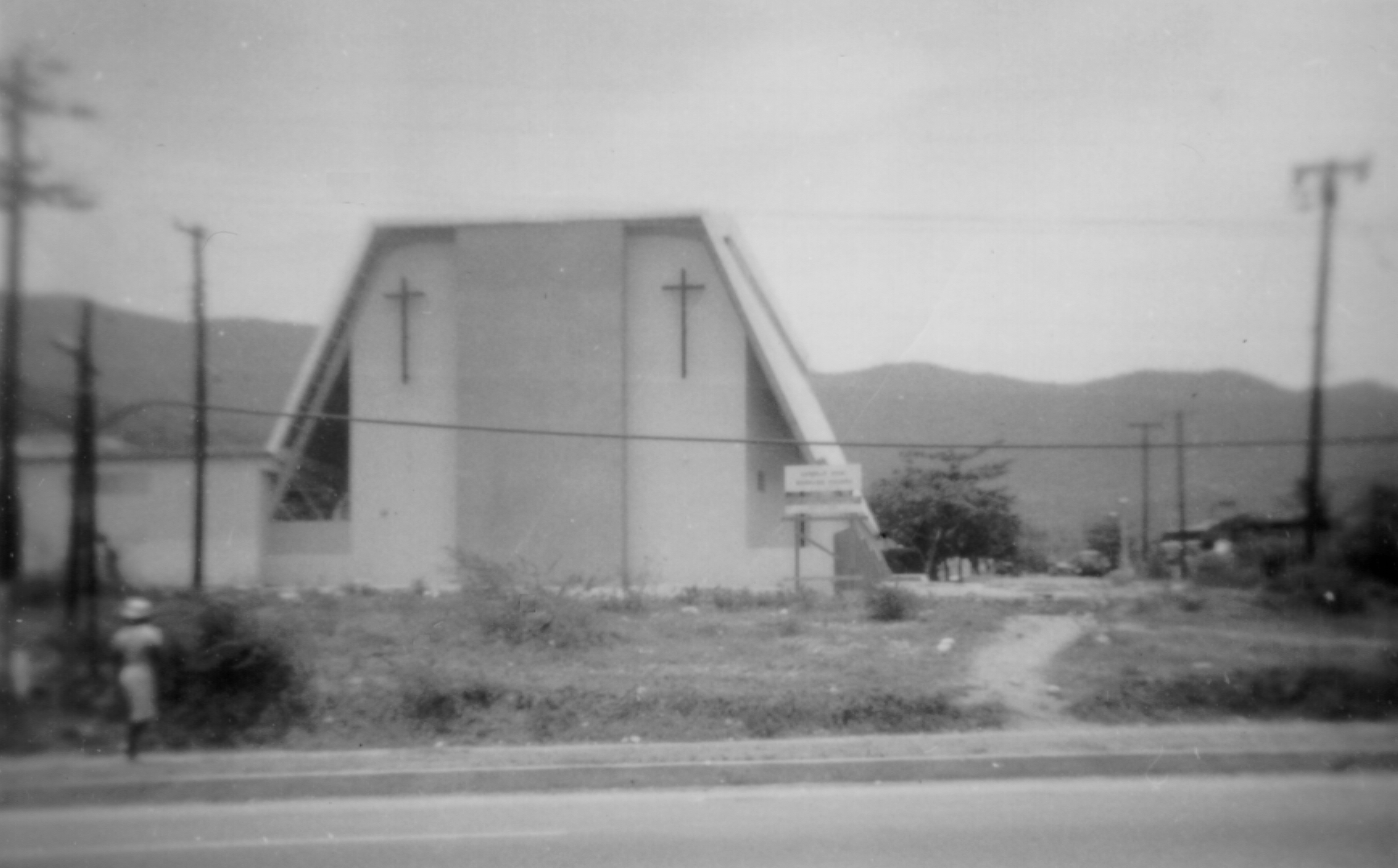
Harbour View Moravian

- Surrey District

** Covenant

Minister: Rev. Jermaine Gibson

  - Trinity. Established 1956.

- Supplementary Minister: Rev. Patrick Coke

Minister: Rev Winston Jones

Portmore

Minister: Rev. Kevin Marshall

Supplementary Minister- Rev. George Williams

Harbour View

Supplementary Minister- Rev. Kofi Nkrumah-Young

Minister: Rev. Valerie Royes

** Redeemer

Minister: Rev. Marsha Edwards-Brown

** Four Paths

Minister: Rev. Shantol Davy

- Non-circuit:
  - Covenant Cayman Islands

Minister: Rev. Ruth Stephenson

=== Other work ===
There is a youth camp at New Hope (18.10605°N 77.980683°W) where summer schools are held.

== Archives ==
The church established its own archives in 1957 at the Bethlehem Teachers' College, under the supervision of Mrs Vera MacLeavy. In 1974 the records were placed in temporary deposit at the Jamaica Archives. The five categories of records in the collection are:

- Records of the Provincial Elders Conference
- Congregation Registers and Diaries
- Records of the Bethlehem Teachers' College
- Family Deposits
- Photographs and Printed Material.

The collection includes baptism, marriage and burial records, the earliest dated 1824.

== Educational institutions ==
The Moravian Church in Jamaica founded and continues to oversee nearly 50 educational establishments at all levels, including Bethlehem Moravian College (formerly Bethlehem Teacher Training College), the first in Jamaica.

The Lititz All Age School in St. Elizabeth is the successor to the first primary school established in Jamaica. It accommodated about 300 students. It is one of a total of 46 schools established by the Moravian Church on 68 parcels of land across Jamaica. "Where ever the Moravians founded a church, they also built a school.".

The church also established a training college for men in 1840. But after 50 years it closed due to a lack of funds.

== Architecture ==
There are three main architectural styles of Moravian church buildings in Jamaica:

- Traditional large
- Traditional small
- Modern.

=== Traditional – large church ===
These were mainly built during the early years of the work in Jamaica between 1826 and 1849. They are often the main church of a circuit, where the minister resides in a manse.

They can typically accommodate 700–1000 worshippers.

In addition to the ground floor, there is usually a balcony, often running around three sides of the interior. The balcony is usually the home of a large, 18th century European built pipe organ – originally hand pumped, later converted to electric pumping and now often superseded by a modern electric organ.

There is usually an altar table on a well raised Dais, a pulpit, a font and a lectern.

These buildings were modelled on German churches of the period, with some adaptations to the tropical climate.

The walls are usually built of local stone unrendered externally, plastered internally and painted white. Roofs are corrugated "zinc" sheets, often painted red to hide the inevitable rust. There is invariably a bell either in a separate tower or in a "cupola" over the main door at the front of the building. At the rear, behind the altar table will be a door to a small vestry. There is always a lightning conductor.

Examples: Bethabara, Broadleaf, Carmel, Fairfield, Lititz, Mizpah, Nazareth, Salem, Springfield, Zorn.

=== Traditional – small church ===
These were mainly built during the early years of the work in Jamaica. They are often the outstation churches of a circuit.

They can typically accommodate less than one hundred worshippers.

They comprise a single floor. Musical accompaniment was traditionally piano, now often augmented by a modern electric organ.

There is usually an altar table on a slightly raised Dais, a pulpit, a font and a lectern.

The walls are usually built of local stone unrendered externally, plastered internally and painted white. Roofs are corrugated "zinc" sheets, often painted red to hide the inevitable rust. There is invariably a bell either in a small separate tower (often no more than a pair of wooden uprights and a small roof) or in a small "cupola" over the main door at the front of the building. At the rear, behind the altar table will be a door to a small vestry. There is always a lightning conductor.

Examples:

=== Modern ===
This category covers any later building. Styles and sizes vary.

Construction is usually breeze block, plastered and painted white both internally and externally. Roofs may be corrugated "zinc" sheets (often painted red to hide the inevitable rust) or shingles (wooden tiles). Internal balconies are absent. Organs are modern electric. There is always a lightning conductor.

There is usually an altar table on a raised Dais, a pulpit, a font and a lectern.

Examples: New Beulah, Harbour View, Trinity.

== Ecumenical relations ==
=== World Council of Churches ===
The Moravian Church is a member of the World Council of Churches. Rev. Dr. Paul Gardner, the President of the P.E.C (the Executive Board of the church) is a member of the World Council of Churches governing body, the Central Committee and the Executive Committee

=== Jamaica Council of Churches ===
The Church is a founding member of the Jamaica Council of Churches.

=== Jamaica Ecumenical Mutual Mission ===
The Moravian Church in Jamaica and the Cayman Islands is a member of the Jamaica Ecumenical Mutual Mission (JEMM). JEMM began in 1979 and includes two other denominations, the Methodist Church and the United Church.

Programmes in which JEMM are involved include health care, skills training, agriculture, youth and adult exchanges and leadership development. JEMM also provides counselling centres all over Jamaica.

JEMM's Annual Youth Exchange is a two-week program held each summer in collaboration with the St. Augustine Mutual Mission (SAMM). Each denomination nominates three young people aged 15 to 17 to participate while. Many more similarly aged participants come from SAMM. One week in spent in Jamaica and the other in Florida.

== Bishops ==
Consecrated	Served until	Name
1889		Hannah
1901		Peter larsen
1903	1939	A P Westphal
1942	1960	J Kneale
1961	1983	S U Hastings
1983	1993	Neville Neil
1994	2013	Robert Foster
2007	Active	Stanley George Clarke
2015	Active	Devon Oral Anglin
