= Darliston =

Town in Jamaica

Coordinates: 18°14′N 77°58′W

Location of Darliston in Jamaica

Darliston is a settlement in Jamaica.

Darliston is a town in Westmoreland Parish in western Jamaica. It is located 16 kilometres (9.9 mi) east-northeast of Savanna-la-Mar. In 1991 the population was 1,435 (2007 estimate 1595). Principal economic activities include the production of breadfruit and livestock.

In 2005 the Government of Jamaica opened a transport centre in Darliston costing $6.6m, funded by the national Urban/Rural Renewal Programme and the Westmoreland Parish Council.

Darliston was the birthplace of S U Hastings, the first Jamaican to be consecrated as a bishop of the Moravian Church.
