= Remineralize The Earth =

Non-profit organization based in Northampton, Massachusetts, USA

Remineralize the Earth
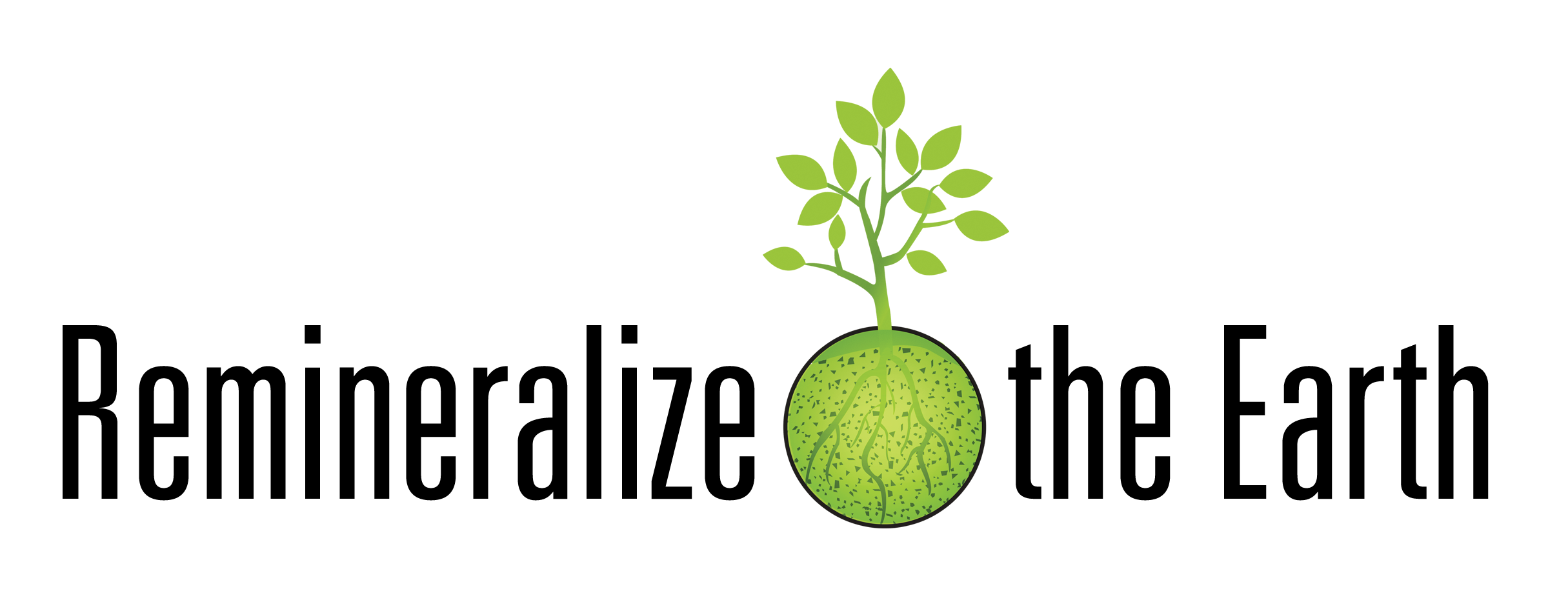
- Formation: 1995; Northampton, Massachusetts
- Founder: Joanna Campe
- Type: Nonprofit
- Purpose: Environmentalism
- Headquarters: Northampton, Massachusetts
- Official language: English
- Website: www.remineralize.org

Remineralize the Earth (RTE) is a 501(c)(3) non-profit organization based in Northampton, Massachusetts, and founded in 1995 by Joanna Campe. The organization's mission is to "promote the use of natural land and sea-based minerals to restore soils and forests, produce more nutritious food, and remove excess CO_{2} from the atmosphere". RTE's vision is to overcome desertification, increase food security by increasing the yields and nutritional values of food grown in healthy soils, and stabilize the climate by amending soils and forests across the globe with readily available and finely ground silicate rock dust and sea minerals.

RTE Director Thomas J. Goreau, and RTE founder Joanna Campe, along with Ronal W. Larson, published the book Geotherapy: Innovative Methods of Soil Fertility Restoration, Carbon Sequestration, and Reversing CO_{2} Increase in 2015, which has been described as "an authoritative guide to some of the most cutting edge methods for soil focused geotherapy." The authors have been lauded "for putting the term Geotherapy on the map in 2014 with the release of their book..."

Education and public outreach about soil remineralization's potential benefits are some of RTE's primary efforts. The organization is currently working on science curriculum for K-12 students that includes multiple topics related to soil remineralization, such as botany, sustainable agriculture, nutrition, and geology. The curriculum draws from information compiled on the organization's website, which contains the only research database dedicated to soil remineralization and related projects around the world. For example, their website "posts studies that show that minerals in rock dust help reconstitute soils better than N-P-K fertilizers (which are also easily leached to groundwater and have been associated with nitrogen runoff, which may lead to toxic algal blooms)." The projects and research papers on RTE's website include a plethora of information and case studies on "reversing global desertification through agroforestry and reforestation, sequestering carbon, and stabilizing the climate." RTE has partnered with the University of Brasilia on an agricultural remineralization project and the University of Massachusetts Amherst on researching combinations of biochar and rock dust for use in agriculture.

== History ==
=== Origins ===
RTE was incorporated in 1995 to "disseminate ideas and information about remineralizing soils throughout the world." The organization was founded on the principles of the growing movement of soil remineralization, which advocates for the use of natural mineral sources as fertilizers. The use of rocks and minerals for agricultural development, known as agrogeology, has been around for centuries, but investigation of the power of soil remineralization through natural mineral sources only began in the 19th century. RTE's mission emerges from the work of individuals and groups who pioneered work in this field. They belonged to one of three distinct groups/areas of work: European research, agrogeology, and the grassroots movement of soil remineralization.

Almost a decade prior to RTE's conception, founder Joanna Campe was featured in Irish Independent while speaking at a Future In Our Hands (FIOH) educational conference. There, she suggested soil remineralization as a way to speed up reforestation efforts, which could help absorb CO_{2} in the face of climate change. The newspaper identified Campe as "founder of TERRA, an American environmental organization." TERRA, which stood for The Earth Regeneration and Reforestation Association, was a precursor to RTE. In the mid-1980s Campe had begun folding rock powders into her garden after coming across the work of John D. Hamaker, an engineer turned farmer and writer who argued that rock dust could mimic the action of soil-enhancing glaciers. In 1986, Campe launched Soil Remineralization, A Network Newsletter in Northampton, Massachusetts with the goal of facilitating an international grassroots movement of soil remineralization. In 1991 the newsletter became Remineralize the Earth Magazine, with a circulation of 2500 people, before transitioning in 1995 into the 501(c)(3) non-profit organization it is today.

"The [remineralization] movement has its roots in agroecology, but can also be traced to the work of a German nutritional biochemist, Julius Hensel, who wrote Bread from Stones in the 1880s."

=== Real Food Campaign ===
RTE's Real Food Campaign, which ran from 2008 to 2013, sought to bring soil remineralization into the general public consciousness by making information about remineralization and nutrient density available to consumers, farmers, and food retailers. Dan Kittredge, executive director of RTE from 2007 to 2008, was the director of the campaign. Kittredge went on to found the Bionutrient Food Association, an organization with the mission of "(increasing) the quality in the food supply" by training farmers in biological soil management.

Their constituents are growers, consumers, and purveyors of food. They, aside from training farmers in biological soil management, organize a yearly Soil & Nutrition Conference.

== Renown & Awards ==
=== Local Media Attention ===
In partnership with Grow Food Northampton, Remineralize the Earth was featured in MassLive, a news and media website based in Northampton MA, for their work with rock dust in community gardens. As explained by Remineralize the Earth founder, Joanna Campe, the rock dust in the soil creates "growth in the microorganisms of the soil and...counters the effects of soil acidity, prevents erosion, [and] repels insects." She continued, "Long term, the silicate strengthens plant tissues so they won’t attract fungus or insects." "[Don] Weaver who is on the board of advisors to Remineralize the Earth said, 'Remineralize essentially means replenishing the full spectrum of the natural minerals to an organism or an ecosystem.’" "This means restoring the mineral base so that all organisms and ecosystems are fully nourished and can reach their biological and genetic potential." The director of Grow Food Northampton, Lilly Lombard, commented that they "want to create the best and most fertile soil," and rock dust is a great help, because it "‘instantly washed into the soil,’" making for easy application.

As featured in the Daily Hampshire Gazette, Remineralize the Earth "was incorporated in 1995 to disseminate ideas and information about remineralizing soils throughout the world." Their focus on putting minerals back into soil seeks to reduce the damages of climate change since remineralization reduces carbon dioxide in the atmosphere. Campe comments that remineralization "‘is a way of imitating the nature creative forces of the Earth by returning minerals to the soil and is something that can be done by anyone from backyard gardeners to the largest farms." Their website features more information on remineralization and is "a clearing house for information, providing a wealth of knowledge and links."

=== National Award for Sustainability (1998) ===
In 1998 Remineralize the Earth was nominated for a Renew America Award by Bill Holmberg, who is a Remineralize the Earth board member and one of the founders of the American Council of Renewable Energy (ACORE). The National Awards Council presented Remineralize the Earth with a Certificate of Environmental Achievement recognizing the outstanding program in the Renew America 1998 Environmental Success Index. According to the EPA, this award was given to "programs throughout the nation that demonstrate leadership and excellence in integrating environmental, economic and community sustainability."

== Partners and Conferences ==
RTE has initiated numerous local and global projects. Local partners include the Paulo Freire Social Justice Charter School (PFSJS), Brook's Bend Farm, Grow Food Northampton, and New Harmony Farm CSA, where the organization used rock dust combined with biochar. International projects include initiatives in Costa Rica, Panama, Barbuda, Cameroon, Senegal and Brazil.

=== US-Based Projects ===
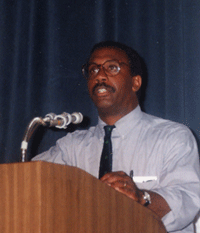
Greg Watson, MA Commissioner of Agriculture, delivers the keynote speech at A Forum On Soil Remineralization and Sustainable Agriculture.

In 1993, the National Task Force on Remineralization of the National Aggregate Association (NAA) met at their headquarters in Silver Spring, MD. The conference was attended by Robert J. Able, Task Group Chairman, Richard C. Meininger and David W. Jahn of the American Aggregates Corp, Sandy Wood of Vulcan Minerals, and other NAA Staff. Attending from the USDA was W.D. Doral Kemper, head of National Programs on Soils, and Ron Korcak, Fruit Lab and the Program on Use of Industrial Byproducts in Agriculture. Also attending was Andrew Euston of HUD, Greg Watson, Commissioner of the Massachusetts Department of Food and Agriculture, and Joanna Campe of Remineralize the Earth.

In 1994, the USDA, the United States Bureau of Mines, the National Stone and Aggregate Associations, and RTE co-sponsored A Forum On Soil Remineralization and Sustainable Agriculture at the USDA headquarters in Beltsville, MD. The USDA conducted a series of demonstration trials with rock mineral fines.

In 1996, RTE received multiple grants to do a two-year research project in the Pioneer Valley at the University of Massachusetts, Hampshire College, Smith Vocational High School, along with organic and conventional farmers. Donors included the Massachusetts Society for Promoting Agriculture, and the International Center for Aggregate Research (ICAR) US.

In 2008, RTE sponsored an official side event at the Washington International Renewable Energy Conference (WIREC2008), invited by the State Department and ACORE.

=== International Projects ===
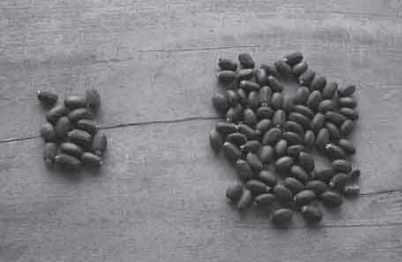
Increased yields of Jatropha seeds, remineralized on the right, control on the left

In 2007, Remineralize the Earth initiated its first international project in conjunction with John Todd, an internationally recognized biologist and a visionary leader in the field of ecological design, and Ocean Arks International. Costa Rica: Food, Fuel, and Income to Sustain Local Communities was an agroforestry project designed by Todd intercropped with native commercial hardwood trees, fruit trees, and Jatropha curcas (a biofuel-producing oil plant) in a local quarry. Over a thousand trees of more than 20 species were planted in abandoned cattle pastures in the Guanacaste region using basalt rock dust from a local quarry, demonstrating greatly increased growth with the rock dust.

John Todd also cited Remineralize the Earth's information on remineralization studies for forests: "In forests, studies have shown growth of four times the timber volume over twenty-four years, using remineralization. One application lasts for sixty years. This is very promising in terms of carbon sequestration in climate stabilization. In western Australia, Men of the Trees, an organization that plants millions of trees in arid landscapes, has achieved up to five times higher growth in seedlings and shortened the potting time from five months to six weeks with soil remineralization and a microbial innoculant."

In 2013, Joanna Campe was a keynote speaker at the II Congresso Brasileiro de Rochagem, and presented The Potential of Remineralization as a Global Movement.

In 2014, RTE presented the only half-day workshop at the Renewable Energy Latin America & Caribbean Conference (RELACCx 2014) in Puerto Rico.

In 2015, the Cuba-U.S. Agroecology Network (CUSAN) invited RTE to be part of an official delegation to visit farms and give presentations on agroecology with rock dust, as practiced in Brazil. Joanna Campe and Dr. Tom J. Goreau gave presentations.

From 2016 to 2018, RTE partnered on a two-year research project in Bahia, Brazil, with the University of Brasília, increasing the productivity for cactus for fodder 3.88 times versus the control.

== See also ==
- Enhanced weathering
- agroforestry
- Thomas J. Goreau
