= Thomas Goreau =

Thomas Goreau may refer to:

- Thomas F. Goreau (1924–1970), marine biologist
- Thomas J. Goreau, his son, biogeochemist and marine biologist
