= Gili Eco Trust =

Non-governmental organization in Lombok, Indonesia

- Founded: 2000
- Purpose: Coral reefs and environment protection
- Location(s): Gili Trawangan; Lombok; Indonesia
- Region served: Lombok and Bali
- Method: Direct action
- Website: giliecotrust.com

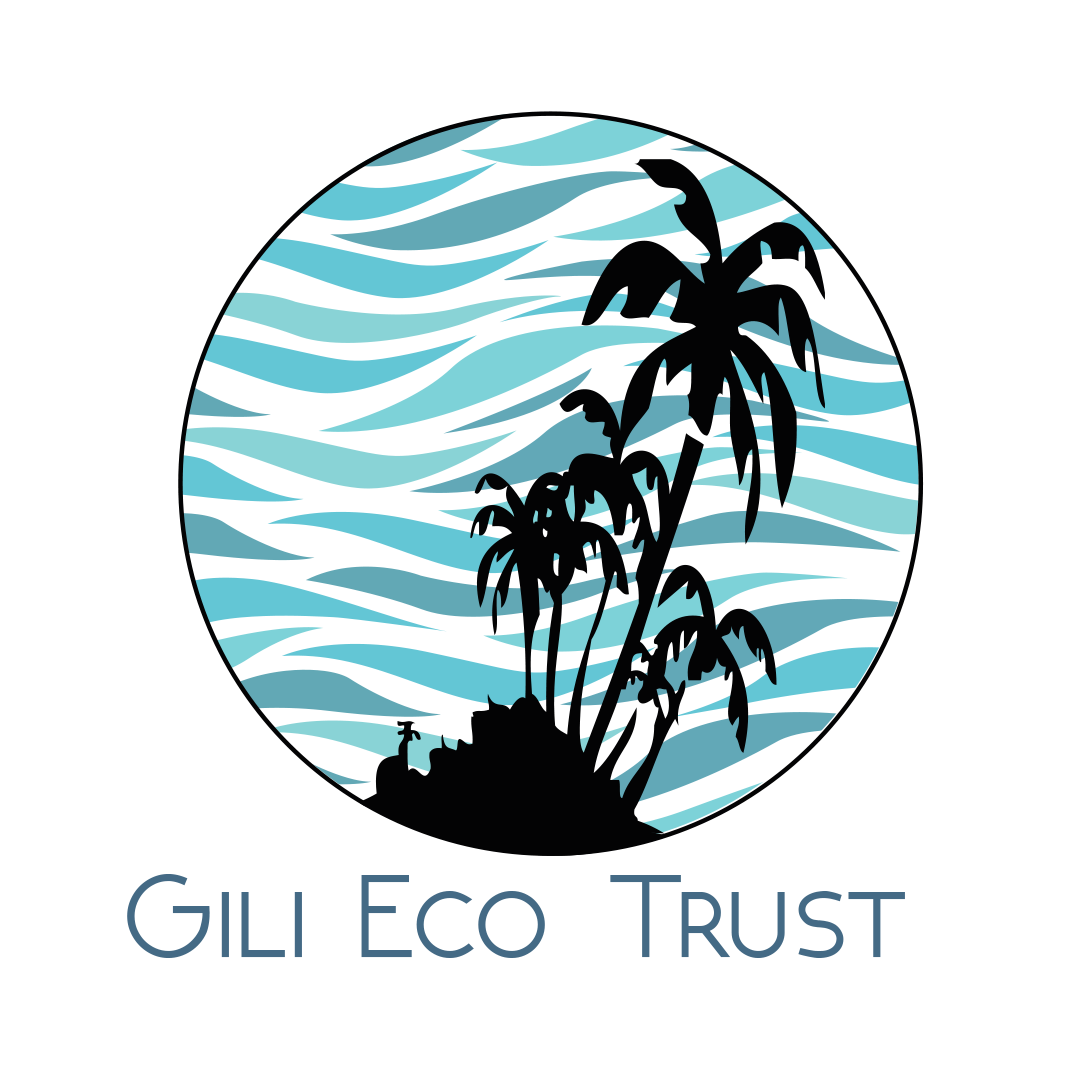
Gili Eco Trust

Gili Eco Trust is a local non-governmental organization created in 2000 to protect coral reefs from destructive fishing around the three Gili Islands, off Lombok, Indonesia.

The trust has extended its activities to many eco-friendly projects, including regenerating coral reefs and fish abundance, weekly beach cleanups, providing education in local and international schools, organizing recycling and garbage collection schemes, university research and studies, setting up sustainable eco tourism using green energy, and providing animal care and free welfare clinics.

== History ==
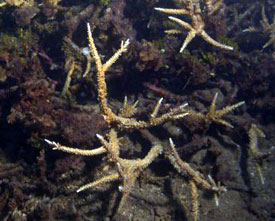
Dead coral

In 1998, SATGAS was funded by local people on the Gili islands to protect coral. Between 1997 and 1998 and because of many degradation causes corals were in such a bad shape that local people decided to react and started patrolling around the islands. They entered into an agreement with fishermen to define fishing areas and lawful fishing practices. Fishermen were indeed fishing with dynamite and cyanide. This destructive method was one of the main causes of coral degradation.

The Gili Eco Trust was founded in 2000 by the dive shops on the Gili islands to financially support the SATGAS. An eco donation of 50,000IDR (€4, US$5) is encouraged from every diver to mitigate their impact to the island upon visiting.

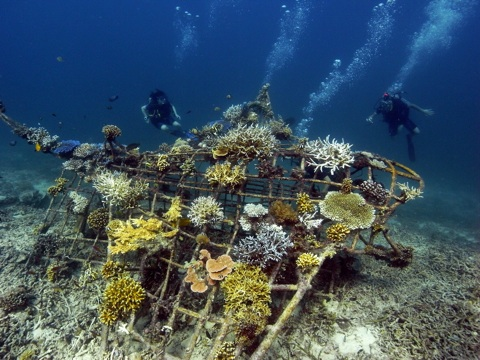
Manta ray Biorock reef

In 2004, Delphine Robbe, part-time coordinator of Gili Eco Trust, imported the Biorock technology in Gili islands to launch a Coral Reefs Restoration Program. Since then 63 Biorock structures have been installed all around the Gili islands to regenerate their reefs.

Since 2006 the Gili Eco Trust has been organizing Biorock workshops every two years. In November 2006 took place the 4th international Biorock workshop. Two other workshops took place in November 2008 and November 2010 with always more participants from all around the world.

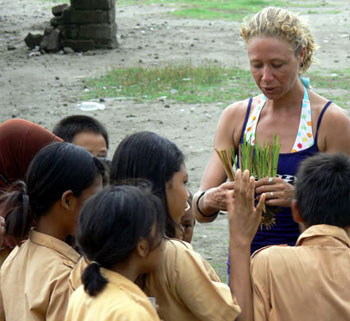
Delphine Robbe, Gili Eco Trust manager, teaching about Vetiver grass

2009 was a turning point: the Gili Eco Trust extended its projects to land environment protection. To support all these projects, Delphine Robbe became full-time coordinator.

2016 saw more than 110 Biorock structures installed in areas where coral reefs were previously destroyed due to illegal anchoring, overfishing and storm damages followed by an unprecedented Il Nino event causing warmer sea temperatures and little or no rainfall in the wet season between November and March. Following this, more than 80% of the Gili Islands coral reefs were deemed bleached or severely bleached as sea temperatures exceeded 32'c for more than 2 months. The Biorock's increased resilience to climate change helped more than 75% corals survive on the structures whereas natural reefs lost up to 40% of coral cover.

Now the Gili Eco Trust leads many various projects to ensure Gili islands' sustainable development and promote eco-tourism.

== Projects ==
The Gili Eco Trust has implemented projects to protect and regenerate corals, and to preserve land environment on the Gili islands.

=== Coral Protection ===
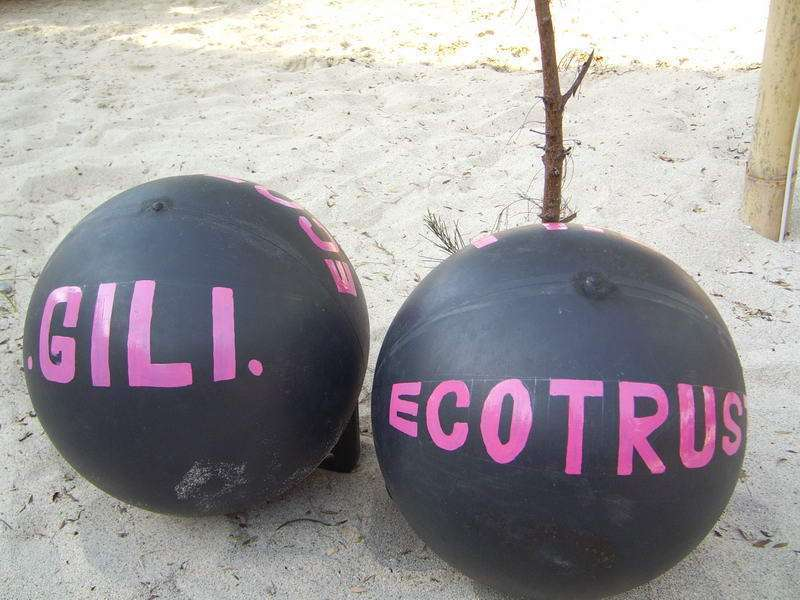
Gili Eco Trust's mooring buoys

The Gili Eco Trust cooperates with the SATGAS (and more recently the marine authorities of North Lombok BKKPN) to protect coral reefs. 20 days per month and on call, members of the SATGAS patrol to be sure that no one destructs coral and that fishermen respect the agreement on fishing areas and lawful fishing practices. The Gili Eco Trust is installing mooring buoys to avoid anchoring on coral reefs. Mooring buoys also help to mark the boundaries of fishing areas.

To gain further students and undergrads to learn more about coral and how to protect it, the Gili Eco Trust has developed a partnership with Mataram University, Lombok. Students in PhD, specialized in marine biology, come to Gili Trawangan to do studies on coral and to learn about Biorock technology.

"Coral Watch" dives are also available in every dive shop. Data collected during the dive help Project Aware scientists in their studies on coral reefs.

=== Coral Restoration ===
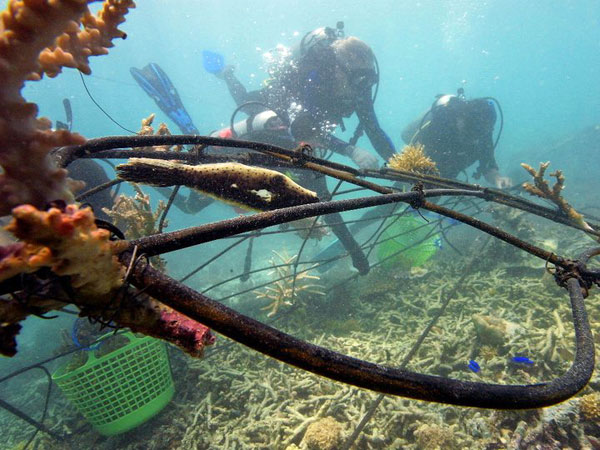
Attaching coral to a Biorock structure

Coral is facing so many factors of degradation that the Gili Eco Trust decided not only to protect coral reefs but to restore them too.

A Biorock Coral Reef Restoration Program has been implemented since 2006. Biorock method consists in installing new artificial coral reefs on the ocean floor. These reefs can have two positive roles: being ideal habitats for corals, fish, shellfish, mollusks, seaweed, etc. and being efficient wave breakers which protect beaches from erosion. Now the Gili Eco Trust wants to develop a Biorock structure which would be provided with electricity by a turbine thanks to sea current. Thus, Biorock method would be more sustainable.

Today, 63 Biorock structures regenerate the Gili islands' coral reefs.

In the same time, the Gili Eco Trust organizes Biorock workshops every two years to teach people from all around the world about Biorock so that they can replicate it in other damaged coral areas.

In 2006 the workshop received 31 participants, 52 in 2008 and 80 in 2010. These workshops are supported by PADI, Project Aware, the Global Coral Reef Alliance, Mataram University, the Lombok government and many businesses on Gili Trawangan.

=== Land Eco-Projects ===
The Gili Eco Trust has various activities on the Gili islands.

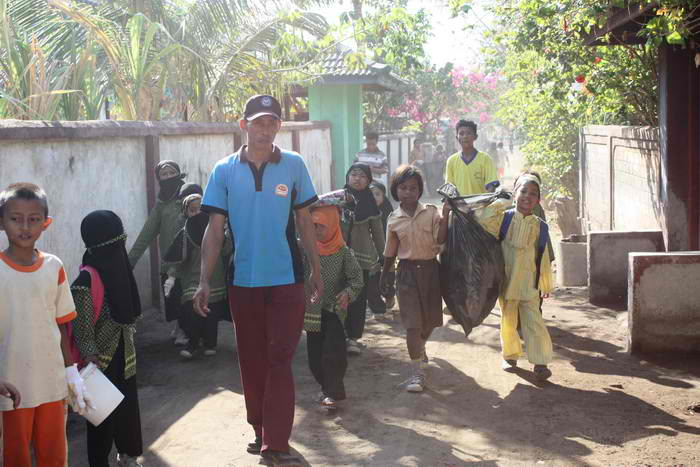
Children participating at the clean up day

Waste Management

Gili Eco Trust's main project on land is improving waste management. Waste is a permanent issue for Gili islands, especially because of their tourism. The Gili Eco Trust works with the FMPL (the waste collection and treatment company on Gili Trawangan) which collects waste every day. The waste dump has been rebuilt and an elevated road has been built to reach it even during rainy season.

Local people are used to burning their waste. This method is extremely polluting. The Gili Eco Trust tries to raise awareness about it and to change local habits and encourages recycling.

General compost has been created, more than a thousand coloured bins have been installed, reusable bags are distributed. Tetra briks are sent to Eco Bali, a partner of the Gili Eco Trust. Glass, cardboard, aluminium cans and plastic are recycled in building materials.

Finally the Gili Eco Trust organizes clean up days every first Friday of the month. Tourists can join children from the local school, volunteers from businesses, the Gili Eco Trust and the FMPL and get a free dive in exchange of their participation.

- Glass: Almost one third of the volume of the rubbish dump on Gili T. consists of glass bottles. Only Bintang bottles are consistently being sent back to the supplier to be refilled, which is the most environmentally efficient way of dealing with empty glass bottles. Although this would also be an option for all other beer bottles, for many small businesses, the cost of collecting and shipping them to the mainland is not economically viable. These bottles, along with all the ones which don't have a deposit on them end up in the overflowing dump in the center of the island or on Lombok as there is no local glass recycling factory.
- Glass workshop: One of the solutions for using all the unrecycled glass was to “turn trash to treasures” and make drinking glasses, ashtrays, lampshades and earrings out of the empty bottles. After a few weeks of research, volunteers set up the glass upcycling workshop on Gili T using locally available tools and a local worker can create products out of discarded bottles. These environmentally friendly wares have already been purchased and put into use by some of Gili T's businesses. Prices range Rp 15,000 to Rp 60,000 per item.
- Bottle walls: Discarded bottles were used as bricks to create a Smirnoff Ice bottle wall next to Intan Inn Hostel and within Sama Sama bungalows. Plastic waste of different colors was stored within the bottles, thus creating patterns in the wall, and offering a more environmentally friendly solution to plastic waste than burning or dumping it. Broken Compass Hostel used all sorts of bottles as internal windows, sources of natural light and lampshades.
- Sand and gravel: As a further solution to the huge amounts of unrecycled glass on the island, the GET invested in two glass crushing machines which produce sand and gravel for use in building projects.
- Deposit bottle collection: The GET aims to centralize the collection of bottles which have a deposit on them and group their shipping so that it becomes economically viable to send them back to Lombok for refill.

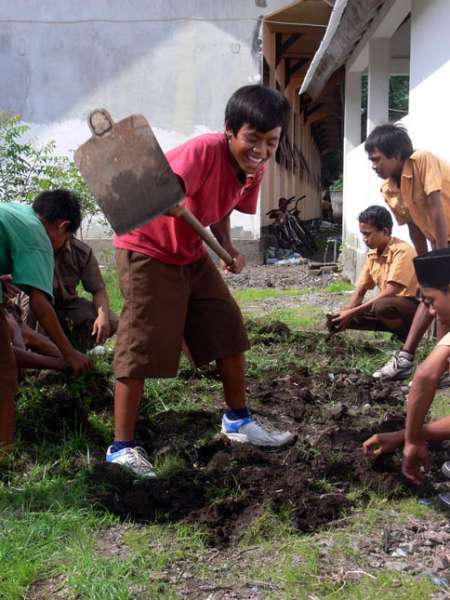
Children gardening at the school

=== Animal care ===
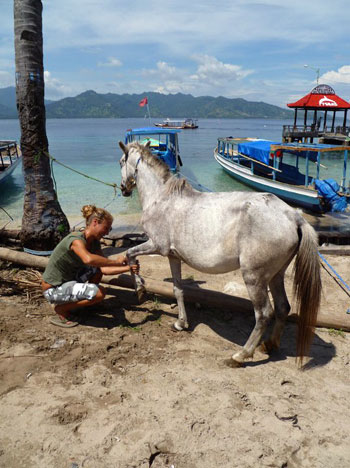
Horses' treatment

Horses

On Gili islands, horses suffer from poor treatment. Whereas horses normally live about 25 years, they do not live more than a few years on Gili islands because of the amount of work they are demanded and the lack of care from their owners who ignore what they need. Pulling carts around the island wouldn't be a problem for their health if they could drink fresh water and rest regularly, and be treated when they need to.

Gili Eco Trust operates free to the islands' horses three times every year, in association with the Animal Aid Abroad Australia and encourages businesses to install in front of their shop a fresh water bucket for the horses.

Cats

Special free clinics are organized to sterilize stray and pet cats by the Cats Of Gili in partnership with Gili Eco Trust, helped by voluntary western veterinary surgeons to help control the population of cats on the island and to improve their livelihoods and welfare.

Turtles

The Gili Eco Trust supports turtle conservation and to preserve populations of Green and Hawksbill turtles. There is no longer any head starting programmes on Gili Trawangan as it is beneficial for the turtle eggs to be left untouched in the sand and to hatch naturally before immediately entering the ocean. The Gili Eco Trust creates sturdy protection cages to guard the nests for the 30-60 days they are in the sand. When a nest has been reported then the Gili Eco Trust will respond by recording nest size, species and protecting and keeping watch over the eggs.

=== Raising awareness ===
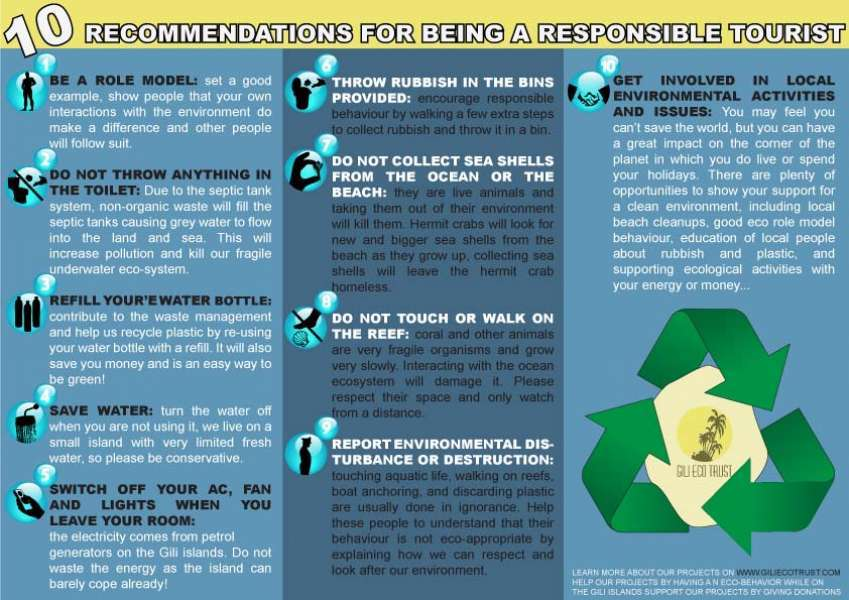
10 recommendations for an eco-behavior

To make things and behaviors really evolve, the Gili Eco Trust raises awareness amongst local inhabitants and tourists.

Every week, Delphine Robbe, Gili Eco Trust manager, teaches the three local school's classes about ecology and English. During 45 minutes, children from six to twelve years old think about solutions to preserve natural richness of Indonesia. They are taught at school on how to cultivate tomatoes, cucumbers, eggplants, aloe vera and vetiver grass.

But the Gili Eco Trust does not only target children. To make every person on Gili islands improve his/her behavior, posters and notice boards have been put up. Gili Eco Trust offers to come to businesses to train their staff in eco-behavior. In the same way, boats owners can be explained why coral is important and how to behave to not damage it.

== Electrified reefs and biorock ==
The electrified reef and underlying biorock processes were invented by Professor Wolf Hilbertz and Doctor Thomas J. Goreau at the end of the 1970s and early 1980s.

=== Principle ===
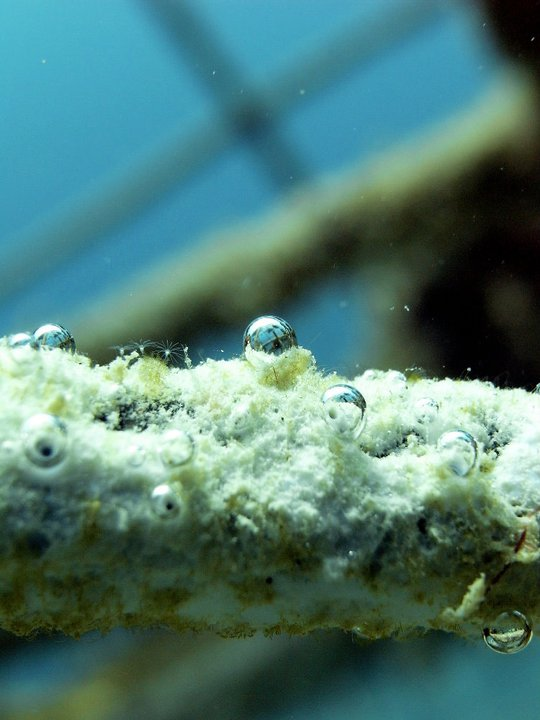
Zoom on a Biorock structure

Electrified reefs are made with crisscrossed metal stems which are crossed by a low-voltage current of 1,2 Volts. These structures are installed on the ocean floor and pieces of corals are attached to them. These corals come from reefs in the neighborhood and were broken for various reasons such as unaware divers and strong waves.

The electric current, which is totally harmless for any organism, leads to electrolysis, causing a calcareous precipitation on the whole structure. This will not only avoid the unwanted appearance of rust which would weaken the structure, but, as coral's skeleton is made of calcareous, the structure will, thanks to this reaction, become the best place for coral to develop.

Thus biorock technology relies on a very simple principle: reproduction by electrolysis of the natural reaction occurring between coral, sea water, sun and dissolve minerals.

=== Results ===
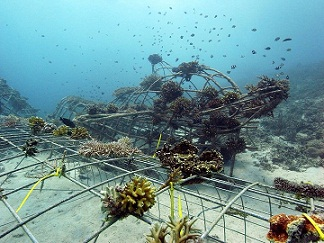
Two Biorock reefs

Biorock technology's electrolysis is catalysis of the natural reaction and not only a simple reproduction, as this electrolysis enables a coral's development 2 to 6 times faster than in usual conditions. Normally coral grows from only some centimeters per year. And so getting its growth quicker is an efficient way to restore reefs. Moreover, coral on Biorock structures grows stronger and is more resistant to hazards it faces.

Hard corals are not the only ones to grow on Biorock structures: tunicates, bivalves, sponges and soft corals also come to develop at speeds higher than the average. On a Biorock structure, their survival and resistance rate is 20 to 50 times higher than in natural environment.

Finally, because electrified reefs rely on electrolysis, its impact benefits all corals and ecosystems around the metal structure in a perimeter with a wingspan of about thirty meters.

These already studied and proved by W. Hilbertz and T. Goreau facts are born out since the 1980s by the efficiency of biorock structures installed all around the world. These structures contributed to damaged coral reefs’ restoration, enlargement of beaches touched by erosion, repopulation of marine areas with many species of fishes and other sea organisms.
