= Electrified reef =

Human-created underwater structure

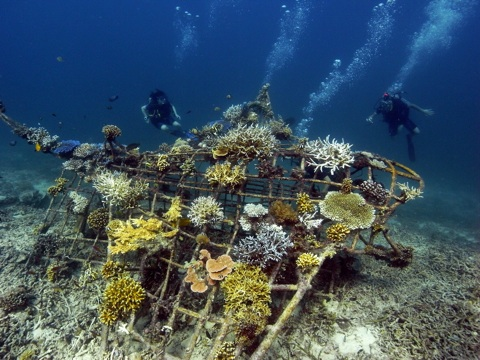
A newly constructed electric reef set up by Gili Eco Trust in Indonesia.

An electric reef (also electrified reef) is an artificial reef made from biorock, limestone that forms rapidly in seawater on a metal structure from dissolved minerals in the presence of a small electric current. The first reefs of this type were created by Wolf Hilbertz and Thomas J. Goreau in the 1980s. By 2011 there were examples in over 20 countries.

== History ==
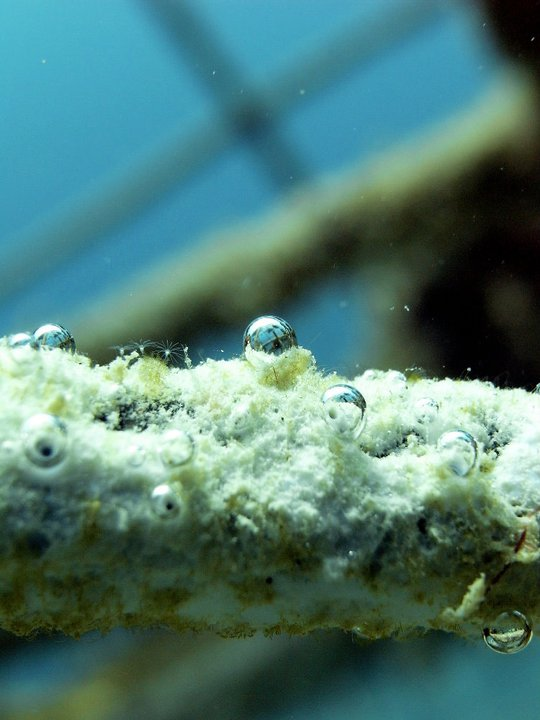
Biorock forming on a submerged metal bar

Artificial reefs have been built since the 1950s using materials including sunken ships and concrete blocks. While artificial reefs have been effective at boosting fish populations and are valuable areas for benthic organisms and other marine life (e.g. sponges) to colonise, they are less viable for coral restoration due to the slow growth of corals and their susceptibility to environmental changes.

In the 1970s, whilst studying how seashells and reefs grow, Wolf Hilbertz discovered a simple method of creating limestone from minerals dissolved in seawater, which he called biorock. Together with Thomas J. Goreau he realised that this process could be adapted to rapidly create artificial coral reefs during the 1980s. Using the names "Sea-ment" and "sea cement", the process was publicised in the 1992 futurology book titled The Millennial Project.

With others, Hilbertz and Goreau made expeditions to the Saya de Malha bank in 1997 and 2002 where they grew an artificial island around steel structures anchored to the sea floor using this process. In the Maldives, 80% of the electric reefs survived the 1998 warming which killed 95% of the natural reef corals.

Goreau continued the work after Hilbertz's death in 2007. By 2011 there were electric reef projects installed in over 20 countries. In 2012, both Goreau and Robert K. Trench published works on how the process could generate building materials as well as restore damaged ecosystems.

== Construction process ==
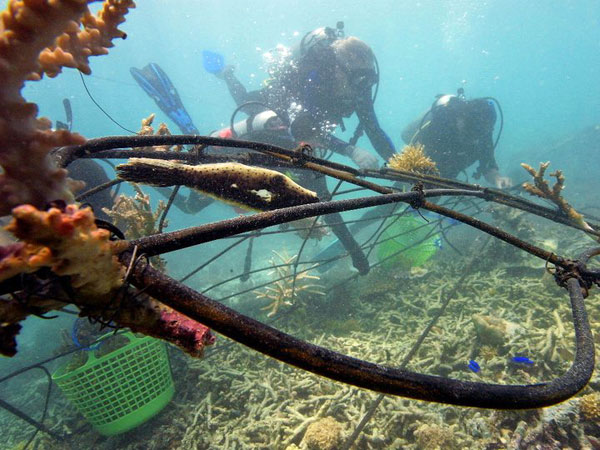
Installing the frame for new reef

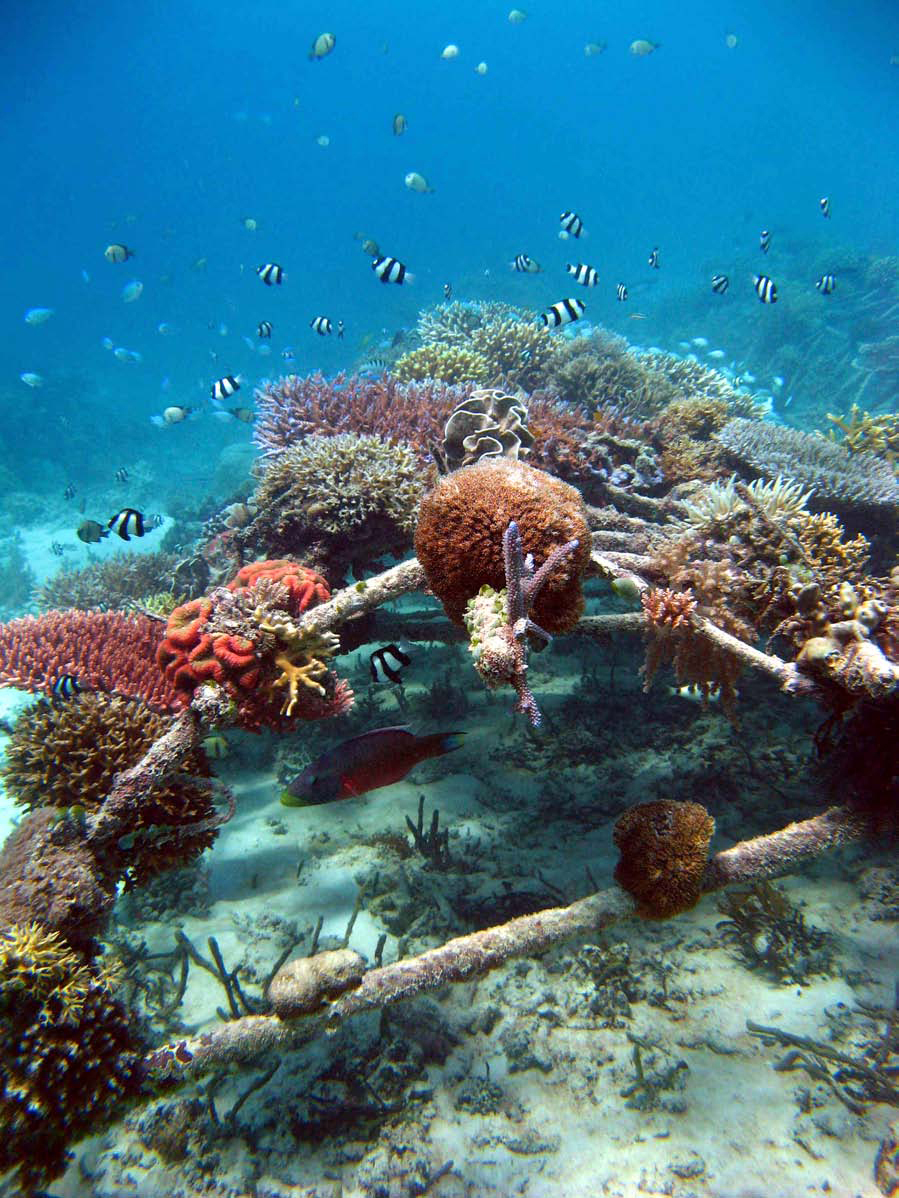
Two-year-old electric reef in Gili Trawangan, Lombok, Indonesia

The base of an electrified reef is a welded electrically conductive frame, often made from construction grade rebar or wire mesh which submerged and attached to the seafloor to which an electrical field applied. The frame (cathode) and a much smaller metal plate (anode) placed at a suitable distance from the frame initiates the electrolytic reaction.

Dissolved calcium carbonate and magnesium hydroxide and other minerals naturally found in seawater breakdown in the vicinity of the anode and recombine and precipitate out of the water onto the cathode. The exact composition of the minerals within the crystal formation is depends on their abundance, the climatic conditions and the voltage used. The structure takes on a whitish appearance within days.

This electric field, together with shade and protection offered by the metal/limestone frame soon attracts colonizing marine life, including fish, crabs, clams, octopus, lobster and sea urchins. Once the structure is in place and minerals begin to coat the surface divers transplant coral fragments from other reefs to the frame which soon bond to the newly accreted mineral substrate.

Because of the availability of evolved oxygen at the cathode and the electrochemically facilitated accretion of dissolved ions such as bicarbonate, they start to grow, some three to five times faster than normal and soon the reef takes on the appearance and utility of a natural reef ecosystem.

== As shore protection ==
Shorelines are increasingly susceptible to beach erosion and loss due to climate change which is resulting in rising sea levels and increasingly frequent and more powerful storms. Large structures such as breakwaters constructed to reflect waves to prevent erosion are problematic and can in fact contribute to further beach erosion since for force of waves is doubled due to the reversal of the wave direction vector with the reflected wave carrying sand from the structure's base back out to sea resulting in the structure failing over time.

Common electrified reef used for shore protection mimic the effect of a natural reef which prevent erosion by dissipating wave energy and causing waves to break before they impact the shore. In nature, large reefs, have been shown to dissipate up to 97% of their energy. They are based around the same open mesh frameworks as those used for coral restoration. Skeletons of dead coral and algae from the reef are then deposited and help grow beaches. Because these reefs mimic the properties of natural reefs they solve some of the challenges they have in storm dissipation and their self-healing qualities helps structures survive extreme storms as long as the electricity supply remains in operation.

In Turks and Caicos trials of electrified reefs of coastal protection survived the two worst hurricanes in the history of the islands, which occurred three days apart and damaged or destroyed 80% of the buildings on the island. Sand was observed to build up around the bases of the reef structure.

In Maldives in 1997, shore protection reefs helped save several buildings, including a hotel, that had risked washing away due to severe beach erosion. The 50-meter-long shore protection reef stabilized and ultimately reversed erosion in several years, even allowing the beach to survive a tsunami in 2004.

== Distribution ==
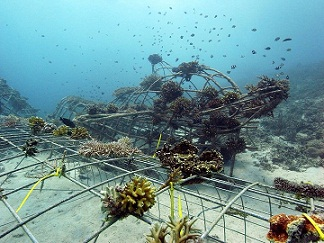
Two Biorock reefs

Electric reef projects had been installed in over 20 countries, in the Caribbean, Indian Ocean, Pacific and Southeast Asia. Projects are located in French Polynesia, Indonesia, Maldives, Mexico, Panama, Papua New Guinea, Seychelles, the Philippines, Thailand and on one of the most remote and unexplored reef areas of the world, the Saya de Malha Bank in the Indian Ocean.

Indonesia has the most reef projects, with sites near over half a dozen islands, including the world's two largest reef restoration projects: Pemuteran with the Karang Lestari and the Gili islands with the Gili Eco Trust.

Non-coral reef projects have been conducted in places such as Barataria Bay, Galveston, seagrasses in the Mediterranean, oyster reefs and salt marshes in New York City, in Port Aransas, and in St. Croix.

== Effectiveness ==
Electrolysis of electric reefs enhance coral growth, reproduction and ability to resist environmental stress. Coral species typically found on healthy reefs gain a major advantage over the weedy organisms that often overgrow them on stressed reefs.

Biorock can enable coral growth and regrowth even in the presence of environmental stress such as rising ocean temperatures, diseases, and nutrient, sediment, and other types of pollution. Biorock represents the only known method that can sustain and grow natural coral species using only basic conducting elements, typically of a common metal such as steel.

The process accelerated growth on coral reefs by as much as five fold and restoration of physical damage by as much as 20 times. and the rate of growth can be varied by altering the amount of current flowing into the structure.

In one study, Porites colonies with and without an electric field were compared for 6 months after which time the current to the electric reef was eliminated. Growth differences were significant only during the first 4 months with longitudinal growth being relatively high in the presence of the field. The treatment corals survived at a higher rate.

On Vabbinfaru island in the Maldives, a 12-meter, 2 ton steel cage called the Lotus was secured on the sea floor. As of 2012, coral was so abundant on the structure that the cage is difficult to discern. The 1998 El Nino killed 98% of the reef around Vabbinfaru. Abdul Azeez, who led the Vabbinfaru project, said coral growth on the structure is up to five times that of elsewhere. A smaller prototype device was in place during the 1998 warming event and more than 80% of its corals survived, compared to just 2% elsewhere. However, power is no longer supplied to the project, leaving it vulnerable to the next round of bleaching.

== Drawbacks ==
Electric reefs require electrical power to maintain them. In Maldives, several electric reefs successfully survived a 1998 bleaching event that killed off nearly all local wild coral, however after being depowered they were killed by the bleaching event of 2016.

A study conducted in the Bahamas in 2015 showed that the electric field deterred sharks, specifically the bull shark and the Caribbean reef shark, from swimming and feeding in the area. The electric field is believed to affect sharks because of their electroreception abilities, however species with similar capabilities such as the bar jack and Bermuda chub did not appear to be affected by the electric field.

== See also ==
- Gili Eco Trust
