= Andrew Nisker (filmmaker) =

Canadian Filmmaker

Andrew Nisker is a Canadian documentary filmmaker, author, activist, and educator. He is the founder of Take Action Films, an independent production company that specializes in environmental and socially conscious documentary cinema. Nisker’s filmography is primarily dedicated to investigating environmental crises, consumption habits, the human trash footprint, and the broader social and political dimensions of environmental degradation and anthropogenic actions. He is an active member of the documentary film community, acting as a panel producer at WCSFP in 2025 and Banff Rockies Award Judge in 2026.

== Filmmaking career ==
Nisker's filmmaking style, informing while entertaining, was inspired by American director Michael Moore's documentary Roger and Me. His oft used tagline 'The Revolution Starts at Home' came from his mentor, the late Bob Hunter.

Nisker's first documentary was in response to his concerns for the world his son Sebastian would inherit. Garbage! The Revolution Starts at Home follows a typical urban family as they keep every scrap of garbage for three months. It was selected for Hot Docs International Film Festival in Toronto, as well as film festivals in Mexico and China.

Another of his films, Chemerical, is about harmful chemicals and their replacement with natural ones. Chemerical put Andrew on the Talent to Watch list with Playback Magazine.

His film Dad and the Dandelions aired on The Nature of Things with David Suzuki on March 2, 2017 was among his most controversial to date. Nisker made the film because he wondered if his father's rare non-Hodgkin lymphoma could be linked to the pesticides from golf courses he played on for years. The film raised the ire of the Professional Golfers Association of Canada (PGA of Canada) to the point that they put out a press release expressing their disappointment at not being consulted about pesticides on Canadian golf courses. Golf Canada also expressed disappointment at the lack of consultation. The film was made into a feature length that went on to premiere in Washington DC at DCEFF in 2018 and New York City in 2019. It received wide international coverage due to the controversial nature of the topic.

His 2020 documentary Coral Ghosts utilizes a century of archival and contemporary underwater photography to chronicle the catastrophic bleaching of global coral reefs and follows marine biologist Dr. Tom Goreau's urgent quest to pioneer reef-restoration technologies like Biorock™

His film Nuked premiered at the Planet in Focus Film Festival in October 2023. Nuked is about the ongoing impact of nuclear testing that took place in 1946 through 1958 on the Marshallese people. Nuked is the most award-winning of all of Nisker's films to date, winning The Uranium Film Festival Best Documentary of 2024, Ecozine Film Festival Best International Film of 2024, and Impact Doc Award of Excellence, Special Mention, Documentary Feature.

== Personal life ==
Nisker lives in Toronto with his wife Lindsay and three sons. His mentor is the late Bob Hunter of Greenpeace.
