= John D. Hamaker =

Mechanical engineer, ecologist, agronomist (1914–1994)

John D. Hamaker (1914–1994), was an American mechanical engineer, ecologist, agronomist and science writer in the fields of soil regeneration, rock dusting, mineral cycles, climate cycles and glaciology.

== Biography ==
=== Background ===
Hamaker was born in St. Louis, Missouri, United States, and graduated from Purdue University in Mechanical Engineering. Concerned for the environment, he became a student of ecology and agriculture and was influenced by books such as Bread From Stones, which showed that plants grow better in soils generated by mimicking natural soil-forming processes that take millennia, such as the advance and retreat of glaciers scouring the Earth's crust, or rock weathering of volcanic lava. In the 1960s, Hamaker cultivated an interest in soil and climate issues, and began publishing articles about how the health of an individual, society and planetary ecology thrive only as an interdependent whole. For 30 years, he wrote and campaigned for organic agriculture based on soil remineralization, and was the first to call for the remineralization of the Earth to forestall the next glacial period within the current ice age cycle. He produced a book, The Survival Of Civilization, in 1982, republished in 2002 as Remineralize The Earth.

=== Early developments ===
In the 1970s, a series of scientific conferences concluded that the world's climate was cooling. Books such as The Cooling, The Weather Conspiracy, The Weather Machine & The Threat Of Ice, Climates Of Hunger, Ice Ages and Climate: Present, Past & Future warned of a coming ice age within decades. In 1975, Newsweek ran an article entitled "The Cooling World" that foretold the decimation of agricultural productivity based on a dramatic decrease in the Earth's temperature. and the New York Times published the article "Scientists ask why world is changing; Major cooling may be ahead". In parallel, books such as A Blueprint for Survival, The Limits To Growth, and The Population Bomb, warned of multiple social, economic, ecological and population crises. At the same time, Hamaker continued to generate articles and bulletins and campaign for the remineralization of the world's soils.

According to his writings, in 1976, Hamaker spread rock dust on part of his 10 acres (40,000 m^{2}) in Michigan. The following year, his corn produced 65 bushels per acre, compared to yields of under 25 from other local farms, and also tested higher in many minerals. He calculated that remineralizing the soil with river, seashore, mountain and glacial rock dust would enable American agriculture to produce four times as much food or the same amount with a 25% reduction in cost, without the need for pesticides or chemical fertilizers.

=== The Survival Of Civilization ===
In 1982, he produced with Californian ecologist Donald A. Weaver The Survival Of Civilization: Carbon Dioxide, Investment Money, Population – Three Problems Threatening Our Existence, which was re-published by Remineralize The Earth in 2002 and in 2006 by SoilandHealth.org. Annotations and supporting evidence were provided by Weaver. The book which initially sold 14,000 copies, concerned the threat of an imminent ice age, remineralizing the world's soils on a local and global scale and reforesting the planet to return atmospheric carbon dioxide to a normal interglacial level near 280 ppm, to help slow the glacial advance.

The treatise was a synthesis of Hamaker's thinking that emerged from his studies and research in several disciplines including soil science and paleoclimatology. His message, dubbed the Hamaker Thesis, was that due to modern agricultural and agro-forestry practices, the soils were running out of minerals, causing the dying and burning of forests worldwide and nutrient deficiencies in food. He offered soil remineralization as a solution, advocating regeneration of soil and forests with rock dusts as an economic and ecologically sustainable alternative to chemical fertilizers and pesticides. Hamaker regarded this as one of the most powerful ideas in human history. The book and its message was well received by soil and nutritional scientists and regarded as a blueprint for restoring the planet's ecological integrity by the worldwide remineralization movement.

=== Testimonials ===
Endorsing the book, Buckminster Fuller, inventor of the geodesic dome, author of the book Critical Path and Professor Emeritus at the University of Pennsylvania, wrote in a publicized letter to Donald Weaver in 1983: "I have received and read John Hamaker's The Survival of Civilization. Well done. Completely convincing.... I will tell all those inquiring of me about matters relevant to our survival that they had best read Hamaker's book." Reviewing the book, writer Bertram Cohen expressed concern that a global climate shift would make the temperate zone part of the sub-arctic zone and deprive humanity of its food supply. Cohen also pointed out that "Dr Herbert Shelton, both in his books and in Hygienic Review, emphasised the importance of soil remineralization in creating a Hygienic Agriculture."

In support of the book, The Earth Renewal Society presented a statement to a Congressional hearing in Chicago in March 1984.

== Discoveries and inventions ==
=== Rock medicine ===
Hamaker believed remineralizing the world's soil with rock dust, a quarrying by-product, could revitalise barren soil and reverse climate change. Rock dust nourished soil micro-organisms whose protoplasm is the basis of all living things. When mixed with compost, the dust created rich, deep soils which could produce high growth vegetation free from pests and predators, at an accelerated rate. The idea was later confirmed by agricultural scientists such as Arden Andersen, who showed how high sugar and mineral levels in soil gave immunity to soil bacteria, stopping insect and fungal attacks. For Hamaker and Andersen, minerals were the primal food for micro-organisms which provided life and health for the soil.

=== Rock grinders ===
Hamaker invented an autogenous rock grinder, designed to grind rock upon rock with minimal wear of metal parts, and a macro version, both for creating rock dust. The full design for the rock grinder was described in The Survival Of Civilization and Donald Weaver's To Love And Regenerate The Earth. On 19 October 1984, China's Research Institute of Forests accepted a copy of Hamaker's rock grinder patent papers, since at the time, China was taking the lead in reforestation programs.

== Scientific basis ==
=== Climate cycles ===
The Earth's soil is demineralized during every interglacial period, the short 10,000-year warm period between every 90,000-year glacial period which is within the current Ice Age or Quaternary Period encompassing the Pleistocene and Holocene, or current interglacial. This causes a decline in the world's forests and other vegetation which are carbon dioxide sinks, and so more carbon dioxide is released into the atmosphere. Carbon dioxide levels in Earth's atmosphere rose throughout the 20th century and continue to do so. Excessive heat from the sun is trapped by CO_{2} and other greenhouse gases, affecting global climate. Hamaker explained the 100,000-year cycle of major ice ages by postulating that the greenhouse effect takes place mainly in the tropics, which receives the most sun, instead of in polar regions.

=== Polar expansion ===
When temperature differences between the poles and the tropics increase, a cycle of heavy wind, hurricanes, storms and tornadoes occurs. More evaporated moisture is carried to higher latitudes where it is deposited in ice and snow, the eventual result being glaciation and another ice age. Record snow in the Northern Hemisphere and the shortening of the growing season is a prevailing pattern. As glaciers advance and recede during each ice age, they grind down rocks in their path. The mineral-rich dust is distributed over the Earth's surface, by powerful wind and water systems, remineralizing soils and enlivening plant life.

=== Shorter growing season ===
Hamaker believed that within as little as a decade, the growing season would decrease leading to mass starvation in rich and poor nations alike. He therefore proposed the remineralization of the world's soils and reforesting the land, to propagate carbon sinks, thereby absorbing carbon dioxide from the atmosphere, and so contributing to general climatic stability. By assuming the task of remineralizing the Earth's soils, just like glaciers do during an ice age, remineralization would create fertile soils – the basis for the re-creation of stable ecosystems.

=== Glacial threat ===
Hamaker believed in a distinct and imminent threat of a new glacial period, following a long series of glaciations in the geological and glacial-interglacial cycle timeframe. He felt that remineralizing the world's soils and reforesting the land could generate a climax geosystem (as opposed to a pioneer one), through mass reforestation. This would solve the climate crisis as well as the food crisis, by assisting the planet's ability to geophysiologically self-regulate, and potentially, postpone the next glaciation indefinitely.

=== Volcanic El Ninos ===
Hamaker also believed that increased tectonic activity occurring with snow and ice buildup, could heat up tropical oceans through sea floor volcanism, and in addition to the intensified greenhouse effect, be a prime cause of the El Nino phenomenon.

== Corroborated findings ==
In 1983, Nicholas Shackleton and other UK scientists published an article in Nature which stated that the last glacial period began when the CO_{2} in the atmosphere reached about 290ppm, and that the world was already ahead of that figure at a critical 343-345 ppm. Hamaker explained the significance of Shackleton's findings in Acres USA: "CO_{2} has its primary importance as the initiator of glaciation. Once an extensive ice field is established, its cooling effect maintains the temperature differential which keeps glaciation going. Variations in the amount of CO_{2} simply cause variations in the world albedo, but they do not stop or start glaciation. The world is committed to glaciation when the ice fields alone reflect enough sunlight to ensure cooling."

On 3 June 1984, Hamaker appeared on Ted Turner's Atlanta Superstation declaring that increased high-latitude albedo is what initiates glacial advances/retreats. He was citing Sir George Simpson's 1938 analysis on ice ages and later commentary by Richard Somerville and Lorraine Remer of the Scripps Institution of Oceanography in their article in the Journal of Geophysical Research: "It's that cloud that you have to worry about because it's reflecting 80% of the sun's energy back into space and it's never becoming effective in warming the Earth. So we're getting cooling as the result of the carbon dioxide buildup." Around this time, Scientific American summarized: "They (Somerville & Remer) suggest the global warming might be lessened by concurrent changes in the properties of clouds... Denser clouds will reflect a larger proportion of incoming solar radiation; the reduction in the energy reaching the surface will counteract the greenhouse effect."

Also in 1984, Robert Beckman produced The Downwave citing the studies of Dr. Raymond Wheeler and its climate-societal implications.

In 2007, climatologist George Kukla, expressed support for the belief in an imminent ice-age.

== Remineralization benefits ==
=== Primary benefits ===
- Provides slow, natural release of elements and trace minerals.
- Increases the nutrient intake of plants.
- Increases yields and gives higher brix. Brix is the measure of dissolved solids in the sap of fruits and plants that correlate with greater nutritive value.
- Rebalances soil pH.
- Increases the growth of micro-organisms and earthworm activity.
- Builds humus complex.
- Prevents soil erosion.
- Increases the storage capacity of the soil.
- Increases resistance to insects, disease, frost and drought.
- Produces more nutritious crops (minerals are essential for human health).
- Enhances flavor in crops.
- Decreases dependence on fertilizers, pesticides and herbicides.

=== Further benefits ===
- Reafforestation.
- Increases forest and land resources.
- Sustainable forestry, farming and energy opportunities.
- Enhances ecosystems.
- Increases biodiversity.
- Carbon offsetting.
- Greater climatic equilibrium.
- Preservation of interglacial climate conditions.

== Influence ==
John D. Hamaker's work inspired a growing movement of people to become involved in remineralization, including permaculturists, organic farmers, biodynamic farmers, gardeners, vegetarians, environmentalists, scientists, climatologists, journalists, religious groups, political groups, community organizations and ordinary citizens.

=== Remineralize the Earth ===
In the 1980s, Hamaker became a catalyst for the formation of Remineralize the Earth (RTE), set up by Joanna Campe, its president and executive director who produced the Soil Remineralization Newsletter in the 1980s and Remineralize the Earth magazine in the 1990s, before the non-profit organization's incorporation in 1994.

Remineralize the Earth began promoting the regeneration of soils and forests worldwide with finely ground rock dust as a sustainable alternative to chemical fertilizers and pesticides. As well as recycling and returning organic matter to the soil, the organization asserted that returning all of the mineral nutrients which create fertile soils and healthy crops and forests, was equally important. For RTE, remineralization was essential to restoring ecological balance and stabilizing the climate.

In 1994, the U.S. Department of Agriculture (USDA), U.S. Bureau of Mines, National Stone Association and National Aggregates Association co-sponsored a symposium "Soil Remineralization and Sustainable Agriculture" at USDA headquarters in Washington DC.

In 1995, Campe coordinated a two-year research project with the University of Massachusetts Amherst into remineralization.

In Campe's letter to Newsweek magazine in October 2006, she warned that global warming could trigger an ice age and that soil remineralization and reforestation were the solutions. In the same period, major magazines expressed concern of a coming ice age including the Atlantic Monthly, National Geographic, Discover Magazine, The Spectator and BBC Focus Magazine. Institutes in Northern Europe and the Woods Hole Oceanographic Institute shared the concern.

Campe was invited by the U.S. State Department to speak at the Washington International Renewable Energy Conference 2008.

In 2009, the Global Coral Reef Alliance invited RTE to produce a chapter for the DVD ROM book The Green Disk: New Technologies for A New World, being distributed to all U.N. delegates at the United Nations Climate Change Conference (COP15) in Copenhagen during December 2009.

RTE's Real Food Campaign, directed by Dan Kittredge, is a project promoting nutrient rich food and creating a new standard for food quality. Award-winning ecological designer, John Todd, of Ocean Arks International directs RTE's Agroforestry Project in Costa Rica, a project intercropping commercial hardwoods, fruit trees and jatropha, which produces a sustainable biofuel while regenerating the soil.

=== Sustainable Ecological Earth Regeneration ===
Inspired by Hamaker, in the 1990s, Cameron and Moira Thomson set up the charitable trust Sustainable Ecological Earth Regeneration (SEER) in Scotland, to develop the ideas which Hamaker founded.

In Paul Kelbie's article Remineralization Might Save Us From Global Warming, in The Independent, he wrote that since the last ice age, three million years ago, the Earth has gone through 25 glaciations, each lasting about 90,000 years, and that we are now 10,800 years into an interglacial – a hiatus between ice–ages. Previous interglacials averaged 10 to 12,000 years in duration, with the most significant environmental change being interglacial soil demineralization and retrogressive vegetational succession. Since this meant modern soils were relatively barren, leading to the adoption of imbalanced and artificial fertilisers, it was SEER's belief that "By spreading the dust, we are doing in minutes what the earth takes thousands of years to do – putting essential minerals in the rocks back into the earth." SEER won funding from the Scottish Executive to conduct the UK's first official rock dust trials, and maintained that rock dust could fight climate change because calcium and magnesium in the dust converts carbon in the air into carbonates, in addition to enhanced biosequestration by soil organisms and vegetation. The theory captured the attention of NASA who were researching the growing of plants on other planets.

For SEER, as well as producing high yields, and re-balancing the Earth's ecology and geophysiology, rock dusting also brought nutritional benefits due to the enrichment of crops, and so benefits to human health.

But the SEER centre has been frustrated in their hopes to provide scientific proof of their claims for higher yields and enriched crops, through the use of rock dust. Their 3-year flagship research programme with Glasgow University (2009) found that rock dust made no difference to crop yield or nutrient-content in the test conditions.

=== Regenerate The Earth ===
In 2002, 20 years after Hamaker's book was published, Donald Weaver produced To Love And Regenerate The Earth, an update on Hamaker's book, which was published by Remineralize The Earth and re-published in 2006 by Soiland Health.org. The new book clarified ideas raised in the original book whilst providing new evidence from the 1990s and 2000s to show the direction of climate and environmental change.

Weaver considered Hamaker a broad synthesist in the fields of ecology and climate, who recognized how the forests and the trees integrated with the whole biological-tectonic-climatic Earth system. For Weaver and Hamaker, a new glacial period, one in a long series of glacial periods, was due in the geological and glacial-interglacial cycle timeframe. Weaver explained that Hamaker was convinced that humanity was rushing into the next glacial period due to carbon dioxide build-up after the normal interglacial soil demineralization and retrogressive vegetational succession, as summarized by Johannes Iversen and Svend Andersen, state geologists from Denmark in the book The Holocene by Neil Roberts.

=== Institute For A Future ===
In the mid-1980s, author, and Harvard clinical psychologist, Larry Ephron, set up the U.S. based Institute For A Future and wrote The End: The Coming Ice Age & How We Can Stop It, which examined the theory and themes raised in Hamaker's book citing climatologist Reid Bryson, of the University of Wisconsin: "Breakthroughout never come from within the establishment."

The book specifically examined man's influence on nature and climate change. Topics covered included astrophysics, climatology, geology, glaciology, microbiology, paleobotany, paleontology, palynology, plate tectonics, soil remineralization, seismology, soil science, solar physics and human survival.

Ephron showed how climatologists such as John Gribbin and Stephen Schneider who recognized the connection between global warming and the buildup of snow and ice, saw ice buildup only as a side effect of continued overall warming, rather than linking CO_{2} increase, global warming, ice buildup, glaciation and ice ages, together. An exception was Pierre Lehman, a Swiss atmospheric physicist who noted the important link between soil and climate. NASA climatologist James Hansen was also noted as saying "it is not certain whether CO_{2} warming will cause the ice sheets to shrink or grow. For example, if the ocean warms but the air above the ice sheets remains below freezing, the effect could be increased snowfall, net ice sheet growth."

In the book, Dave Foreman, Founder of Earth First! wrote: "An ice age is coming, and I welcome it as a much needed cleansing. I see no possible solution to our ruination of Earth except for a drastic reduction of the human population." Also quoted is S. W. Matthews, assistant editor, National Geographic: "The ice age, which has really not left the planet for two million years, is reasserting itself. The warm time... is over. The next great return of ice has begun." and Paul Gersper, Professor of Soil Science, University of California: "The actions recommended here are urgently needed to avoid global disaster."

A film was made of the book called Stopping The Ice Age in 1988, which Ephron co-produced and directed. Like the book, it carried endorsements from various scientists and universities including Kenneth Watt, Professor of Environmental Studies, University of California: "An astonishing service for humanity" and recording artist, Sting: "Everybody has to see this". Ephron's writing on the ice age threat also appeared in The Globe and Mail, the Los Angeles Weekly and Acres USA.

=== New Energy Movement ===
In the 1980s, a contemporary of Hamaker, Alden Bryant, founded a campaign organization called Earth Regeneration Society with former IBM engineer Fred Wood, Barbara Logan and others, advocating global soil remineralization, reforestation, carbon dioxide reduction and a new energy movement. After attending many international conferences on climate issues, Bryant set up the New Energy Movement organization.

== Further proponents ==
Several books citing remineralization have been published including The Tree War: How to Save the Earth and Bring Together the Nations, The Enlivened Rock Powders, The Secrets of the Soil, Empty Harvest and The Secret Life Of Plants.

In the late 1980s, Peter von Fragstein of the University of Kassel, Germany, began researching remineralization with many different rock types as a slow-release fertilizer and to deter insects.

Hamaker's research also complemented work by Bill Mollison on permaculture, John Jeavons and Masanobu Fukuoka on sustainable organiculture, Emilia Hazelip on synergistic agriculture and Rudolf Steiner on biodynamic farming. It further brought interest from science writer Philip Callaghan who developed the rock dusting theme in his work on paramagnetism, a field related to radionics, biophotonics, bio-energetics, bio-resonance, Schumann waves, magnetometeorology and subtle energy.

In the 1990s, the Men of the Trees organization in Australia conducted remineralization trials on many species of trees in Australia with significant results, such as five times the growth of tree seedlings of one variety of eucalyptus, compared to the untreated controls.

Barry Lynes wrote Climate Crime in 1985 chronicling the case for global cooling, and Robert Felix, author of Not by Fire But By Ice echoed concerns about re-glaciation, expressed by Hamaker and Bryant, which he documented at Ice Age Now.

In the 2000s, NCAR scientist Dr. Lee Klinger began to investigate the relationship between rock dust and plant growth to save dying trees, and NASA began to experiment with lunar soil, plant growth and hydrophonics.

In 2001, Alanna Moore wrote the book Stone Age Farming: Eco-Agriculture for the 21st Century which combined remineralization with permaculture for a new eco-agricultural paradigm.

In 2005, Allan Yeomans documented in Priority One, the potential to bring atmospheric carbon to pre-industrial levels within 5 years, through remineralization of the world's agricultural lands. For Yeoman, as well as reducing global CO_{2} levels to safe levels, it would revitalize the soil and biological life on the planet, and increase human nutrition and health levels.

In 2006, British author Graham Harvey produced the book We Want Real Food which documented the results of remineralization, in terms of soil health and nutritional values in food, and documented major declines in the mineral content of crops.

== Rocks for Crops ==
In 2007, the research organization Rocks for Crops was initiated by soil scientist, Jairo Restrepo Rivera of the University of Pelotas, Rio Grande do Sul (Brazil), who translated Bread From Stones into Spanish and gave conferences on remineralization in Colombia, Brazil and Mexico; Peter Von Straaten from the University of Guelph (Canada); and Suzi Teodoro from the University of Brasília (Brazil).

The group confirmed that a branch of geology called agrogeology, originating at the University of Guelph, was evolving, since Von Straaten published the book Agrogeology: The Use of Rocks for Crops and Rivera produced the book and video, Manual Práctico ABC de la Agricultura Orgánica y Harina de Rocas, which described how to regenerate overcultivated soils with rock dust. The science was developing in Germany, Canada and USA, and being researched in Brazil, Tanzania and the Canary Islands. Other university researchers included professors William Fyfe and Ward Chesworth.

The science of agrogeology is the study of natural geological materials suitable for restoring soils as an alternative to chemical fertilizers, particularly for worn out tropical soils. Due to intense tropical rainfall, chemical fertilizers are washed away from laterite soils within weeks, and cannot be stored by the soils, are thus especially harmful to the groundwater. Rock fertilizers supply nutrients over longer periods to cultivated plants. When the rocks break down, new minerals are made available to the soil micro-organisms and whole soil-food web. From the soil chemist's perspective, the process improves the ion-exchange capacity of soils while forming new clay minerals.

In November 2009, a Rocks for Crops conference was held in Brasília with 170 participants to discuss the new science. Further conferences were held in Rio de Janeiro and in Mexico, in December 2009 for the study and promotion of remineralization worldwide.

== Legacy ==
Hamaker conducted the groundwork for a mass movement of people concerned about the health of the world's soils, sustainable forests, climate change and improved nutrition from food. His proposal, rock dusting, known to enhance plant growth by nourishing biological and chemical aspects of the rhizosphere, resulted in soil regeneration to boost global plant cover. This assisted Earth's self-regulation and offered a more natural geoengineering solution to the climate crisis not dependent on high technology, or on-going climate manipulation by man. Some scientists have postulated that technological solutions may exist to assist the remineralization process, such as converting carbon dioxide into organic carbon to be mineralized as sediment before being weathered to soil.

== Writings ==
Hamaker's main book was The Survival Of Civilization (1983, 2002). He also produced various articles and publications from the 1960s to the 1990s. His ideas were further elucidated by Donald A. Weaver in his book To Love & Regenerate The Earth (2002), and in articles for publications including Living Nutrition magazine, resulting in the publication of the e-book "Regenerate the Earth!: Nature's Call to Remineralize Our Soil, Re-Green Our Land, Rescue Our Climate and Restore Our Health" by Vibrance!, in 2001. Weaver remains involved in education campaigns to alert humanity to the climate crisis and foundational rock dust solution.

== Criticisms ==
=== Energy ===
Hamaker's hypothesis is criticised because fossil fuel energy is potentially required to create and distribute rock dust, and this generates CO_{2} when derived from fossil fuel, however, rock dust is predominantly a byproduct of the existing aggregate and quarrying industries Future rock dust production for broad-scale soil remineralization can be powered by renewable sources, such as wind energy and bio-fuels grown on remineralized soils.

=== Climate control ===
Since land is naturally fertilized in glacial periods, remineralizing the Earth would emulate the glaciation process, allowing the reversal of what Hamaker and Weaver referred to as the interglacial soil demineralization and retrogressive vegetational succession (decline in the vegetative index). They reasoned that this would indefinitely sustain the interglacial ecosystem and climate, or at least slow down the speed of re-glaciation. However, scientists such as Mukul Sharmar, Charles A. Perry, Yuk Yung, Nigel Calder, Henrik Svensmark, Eigil Friis-Christensen, Knud Lassen and Alexander Chizhevsky who have cited variations in the sunspot cycle as the dominant mechanism in climate cycles on Earth, not vegetation, have yet to incorporate the demineralization dimension.

More than a mini ice age in 2013–2041, Hamaker's immediate concern was the shortening of the growing season from the coming glacial period, which he believed could be forestalled through rock dusting, resulting in more abundant yields at harvest. He believed the coming glacial period would preceded by an interglacial-to-glacial transition phase already underway since the 1970s, and strongly advocated an intensive global co-operative soil remineralization effort to maintain the quantity of food while improving its quality. To achieve this, he recommended simultaneous remineralization of dying forests and soils, also needed to grow bio-fuels, as part of a goal to return excessive carbon dioxide to stable interglacial levels of 280 ppm.

== See also ==
- Immobilization (soil science)
- Mineralization (soil)
- Noctilucent clouds
- Remineralisation
- Rockdust
- Rock flour
