= Geotherapy =

Geotherapy is the metaphor that earth's Biophysical environmental problems, like global warming, can be soundly diagnosed and corrected, in much the same way that a medical doctor diagnoses and heals a human body by restoring imbalances in a patient's health. Geotherapy refers to the process of restoring the earth's health by strengthening natural biogeochemical and physiological mechanisms that regulate the earth's planetary life support systems and control global temperature, sea level, atmospheric composition, soil fertility, food, and fresh water supplies. Geotherapy views human health and quality of life as a part of, and hence dependent on, the ecosystem services provided by healthy biomes. It also recognizes the urgent need to regenerate the earth's severely damaged ecosystem services for a sustainable future.

Geotherapy should not be confused with geoengineering. Geotherapy regenerates natural life support mechanisms, while Geoengineering aims to replace them with technological solutions. To avoid confusion between antithetic concepts, Geotherapy, sometimes also called BioGeoTherapy to specifically highlight its focus on the regeneration of natural biological mechanisms, is in direct contrast to hard engineering solutions.

== Origins of geotherapy ==
The term geotherapy was coined in 1991 by Richard Grantham, a molecular biologist, during the French National Center for Scientific Research Colloquium on "Modeling Geotherapy for Global Changes". Grantham organized the colloquium, and with a panel of climate change scientists, co-wrote the Geotherapy Declaration. The declaration sets forth that a "global bioethic" must be adopted to combat climate change from the projected effects of overpopulation and, further, that scientists from all fields must devote themselves to applying their collective knowledge to create sustainable solutions to this global problem. The declaration stressed the gravity of the situation: that the survival of the human species and, in fact, the entire biosphere, was at stake – the 6th mass extinction had already begun and without a cultural shift, life on earth would pay the price. Grantham collaborated with many scientists and doctors, including cancer researcher Van Rensselaer Potter. Potter used graphical representations to map the effects of a shared cultural evolution on humanity's shared biological evolution. Both Grantham and Potter came from medical backgrounds and had similar ideas when it came to the planet, which they thought of as a body of a sick patient that must be first accurately diagnosed and then be prescribed a restorative remedy in order to heal from damages caused by imbalances created by anthropogenic forces.

Declaration for Geotherapy and Bioethics

Accelerating environmental degradation threatens the habitability of the biosphere. We believe that corrective action is possible and urgent.

- Our goal is long-term survival in an acceptably maintained ecosystem.
- We, as human beings, take full responsibility for our actions by not sacrificing natural resources for short term gains and by working to make the world a better living place.
- This choice will influence our biological and cultural evolution; we cannot avoid it without grave consequences.
- A global bio-ethic should further develop a guide and motivate geotherapy and our cultural evolution.
- A root problem is excessive demographic growth; the earth's carrying capacity is being exceeded. With the present style patterns of development pollution of all kinds will increase as long as the population increases.
- We declare that scientists of all walks of life should adopt the aforementioned goals and participate in meeting at all levels to apply these principals.

Through the Geotherapy Declaration, Grantham aimed to create a worldwide "global bioethic" in which humans acted in a positive symbiotic force with nature, acting as stewards for the environment, and actively participating in healing and restoring damages caused by previous humans. His aim had been to influence the thinking of global decision-makers at the then-forthcoming 1992 Rio de Janeiro Earth Summit where the UN Framework Convention on Climate Change was signed. He worked with Thomas J. F. Goreau, a biogeochemist who helped edit the first draft of the UNFCCC Treaty when he had been Senior Scientific Affairs Officer at the United Nations Center for Science and Technology for Development in charge of global climate change and biodiversity issues.

The effort to create a worldwide bio-ethic that embraces the concept of geotherapy was unfortunately cut short soon after the Geotherapy Declaration was drafted in 1991 when Grantham became ill with a neurodegenerative syndrome similar to Parkinson's Disease. The illness rendered him unable to speak or write.

== Geotherapy today ==
The geotherapy principle was revived in 2014 with the publication of the book Geotherapy: Innovative Methods of Soil Fertility Restoration, Carbon Sequestration, and Reversing CO_{2} Increase, a collection of papers that address atmospheric carbon sequestration to reverse climate change in conjunction with the creation of carbon and mineral rich soils for agriculture. Some chapters touch on large-scale changes in global civilization that could help implement a global bioethics, for example switching to a "carbon based economy". The concept is attracting increasing attention and aims to serve Grantham's goal of establishing a scientifically sound regenerative concept to unify global action for a sustainable future. In addition, geotherapy was discussed in a climate change forum called 'Climate Emergency Forum.' The forum is run by the Climate Emergency Coalition, a group based out of M.I.T. and Harvard University in Cambridge, Massachusetts.
