= Project Vesta =

Carbon sequestration company

- Formation: 2019; 7 years ago
- Type: Public-benefit corporation
- Purpose: Environmentalism, Environmental science
- Location: San Francisco, United States
- CEO: Tom Green
- Key people: Kelly Erhart; Grace Andrews; Ryan Hostak
- Website: vesta.earth

Vesta is a public benefit corporation focused on ocean-based carbon dioxide removal. It researches and performs accelerated weathering of the mineral olivine as a coastal protection strategy which helps the ocean naturally remove carbon dioxide from the atmosphere.

Vesta grinds up naturally abundant olivine into sand and places it on the seashore to help replenish beaches and reverse coastal erosion. The sand then dissolves, aided by the movement of the waves, to increase the alkalinity of the ocean which reverses the harmful effects of climate change-driven ocean acidification and helps the ocean perform its natural process of carbon sequestration permanently.

Vesta's technology plans and measures the process, mapping out how fine to grind the sand, how much sand to use, where exactly to place it, and then measuring the increase in impact on ocean alkalinity over time. It currently has a pilot project operating in Southampton, New York and an upcoming project planned in Duck, North Carolina.

In the long term, Vesta's approach could cost as little as $21 and require 40 kilowatt-hours of energy to remove a ton of CO_{2}. Vesta calculates that spreading olivine in 0.25% of the world's shelf seas could be enough to remove 1 billion tonnes of CO_{2} from the atmosphere.

== History ==
Project Vesta originated in the climate change-focused think tank Climitigation. Kelly Erhart, who previously co-founded a waterless toilet company and learned of accelerated weathering from a climate report, co-founded Project Vesta in 2019 as a nonprofit headquartered in San Francisco. Studies had been conducted in laboratory experiments on the process, but no beach experiments had been conducted prior. The organization later changed from a non-profit to public benefit corporation, and then rebranded to Vesta in 2022.

The payment processor Stripe pre-paid 3,333 tons worth of carbon sequestration from the company at $75 per ton.

In 2022, Vesta was featured in a documentary called Solving for Zero where Bill Gates appeared with five scientists and change makers focused on climate change solutions and research.

In 2022, the town of Southampton, New York, in collaboration with Stony Brook University, and Cornell University's Cooperative Extension, and Project Vesta, began a pilot project to place 500 cubic yards of olivine on a Southampton beach that has been eroding as sea levels rise. As part of the pilot and other experiments, the company monitored whether their approach releases concentrations of toxins from the olivine.

In May of 2022, Vesta published its first paper on community engagement, detailing its implementation of deliberative, inclusive, and localized approaches to developing more ethical CDR solutions aligned with climate justice principles.

== Process ==
Vesta is testing whether the olivine weathering process will mitigate coastal recession and reduce ocean acidification. Vesta's process mimics natural weathering processes to transform the olivine into silicates and other stable chemicals, like calcium carbonate which precipitate to the oceans bottoms as marine life consumes the naturally occurring chemical and die (see Carbon in the water cycle for further info). The wave action of beaches on crushed olivine allows for more rapid weathering than other natural deposits of olivine, which only absorb limited amounts of carbon dioxide.

Since the olivine weathering process creates molecular byproducts such as calcium carbonate that could alkalinize acidifying seawater or release metals such as bioavailable nickel, the organization also researches chemical composition and toxicology of affected water and aquatic life. Project Vesta publishes their scientific findings and as of May 2020 made their methods open source.
