= Enhanced weathering =

Approach to carbon sequestration

Enhanced weathering, also termed ocean alkalinity enhancement when proposed for carbon credit systems, is a process that aims to accelerate natural weathering by spreading finely ground silicate rock, such as basalt, onto surfaces, speeding up chemical reactions between rocks, water, and air. It also removes carbon dioxide (CO_{2}) from the atmosphere through the formation of carbonic acid, permanently storing it in solid carbonate minerals or ocean alkalinity. The latter also slows ocean acidification.

Enhanced weathering is a chemical approach to removing carbon dioxide involving land-based or ocean-based techniques. One example of a land-based enhanced weathering technique is in-situ carbonation of silicates. Ultramafic rock, for example, has the potential to store hundreds to thousands of years' worth of CO_{2} emissions. Ocean-based techniques involve alkalinity enhancement, such as grinding, dispersing, and dissolving olivine, limestone, silicates, or calcium hydroxide to address ocean acidification and CO_{2} sequestration.

Although existing mine tailings or alkaline industrial silicate minerals (such as steel slags, construction and demolition waste, or ash from biomass incineration) may be used at first, mining more basalt might eventually be required to limit climate change.

== History ==
Enhanced weathering has been proposed for both terrestrial and ocean-based carbon sequestration. Ocean methods are being tested by the non-profit organization Project Vesta to see if they are environmentally and economically viable.

In July 2020, a group of scientists assessed that the geo-engineering technique of enhanced rock weathering, i.e., spreading finely crushed basalt on fields, has potential use for carbon dioxide removal by nations, identifying costs, opportunities, and engineering challenges.

== Natural mineral weathering and ocean acidification ==
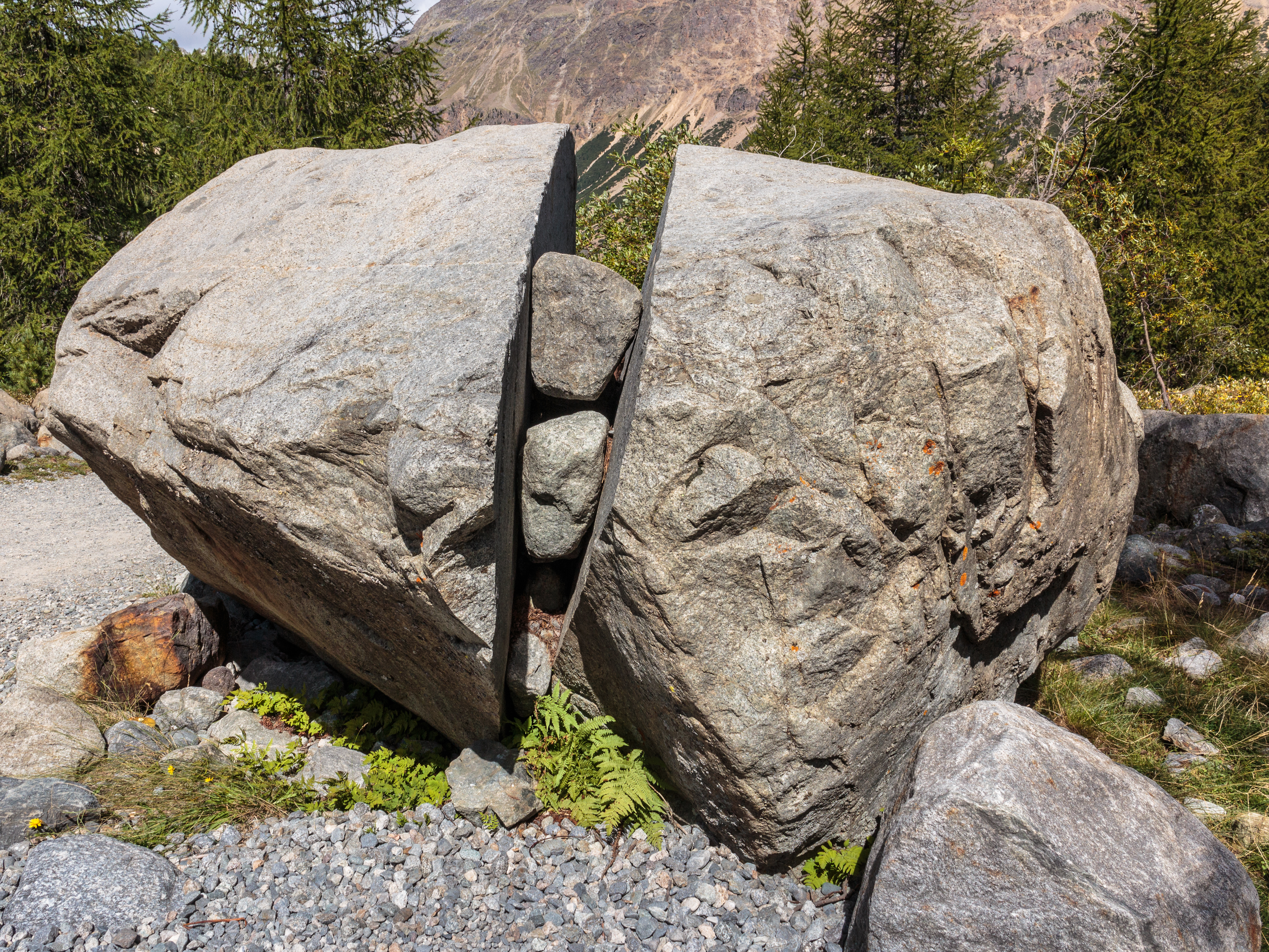
Stone split by frost weathering on the mountain path to the tongue of the Morteratsch glacier.

Role of carbonate in sea exchange of carbon dioxide.

Weathering is the natural process of rocks and minerals dissolving through the action of water, ice, acids, salts, plants, animals, and temperature changes. It is mechanical (breaking up rock – also called physical weathering or disaggregation) and chemical (changing the chemical compounds in the rocks). Biological weathering is a form of weathering (mechanical or chemical) by plants, fungi, or other living organisms.

Chemical weathering can happen by different mechanisms, depending mainly on the nature of the minerals involved. This includes solution, hydration, hydrolysis, and oxidation weathering. Carbonation weathering is a particular type of solution weathering.

Carbonate and silicate minerals are examples of minerals affected by carbonation weathering. When silicate or carbonate minerals are exposed to rainwater or groundwater, they slowly dissolve due to carbonation weathering; that is, the water (H_{2}O) and carbon dioxide (CO_{2}) present in the atmosphere form carbonic acid (H_{2}CO_{3}) by the reaction:

H_{2}O + CO_{2} → H_{2}CO_{3}

This carbonic acid then attacks the mineral to form carbonate ions in solution with the unreacted water. As a result of these two chemical reactions (carbonation and dissolution), minerals, water, and carbon dioxide combine, which alters the chemical composition of minerals and removes CO_{2} from the atmosphere. These are reversible reactions, so if the carbonate encounters H ions from acids, such as in soils, they will react to form water and release CO_{2} back to the atmosphere. Applying limestone (a calcium carbonate) to acid soils neutralizes the H ions but releases CO_{2} from the limestone.

In particular, forsterite (a silicate mineral) is dissolved through the reaction:

Mg_{2}SiO_{4}(s) + 4H_{2}CO_{3}(aq) → 2Mg^{2+}(aq) + 4HCO_{3}^{−}(aq) + H_{4}SiO_{4}(aq)

where "(s)" indicates a substance in a solid state and "(aq)" indicates a substance in an aqueous solution.

Calcite (a carbonate mineral) is instead dissolved through the reaction:

CaCO_{3}(s) + H_{2}CO_{3}(aq) → Ca^{2+}(aq) + 2HCO_{3}^{−}(aq)

Although some of the dissolved bicarbonate may react with soil acids during the passage through the soil profile to groundwater, water with dissolved bicarbonate ions (HCO_{3}^{−}) eventually ends up in the ocean, where the bicarbonate ions are biomineralized to carbonate minerals for shells and skeletons through the reaction:

Ca^{2+} + 2HCO_{3}^{−} → CaCO_{3} + CO_{2} + H_{2}O

The carbonate minerals then eventually sink from the ocean surface to the ocean floor. Most of the carbonate is redissolved in the deep ocean as it sinks.

Over geological time periods these processes are thought to stabilize the Earth's climate. The ratio of carbon dioxide in the atmosphere as a gas (CO_{2}) to the quantity of carbon dioxide converted into carbonate is regulated by a chemical equilibrium: in the case of a change of this equilibrium state, it takes theoretically (if no other alteration is happening during this time) thousands of years to establish a new equilibrium state.

For silicate weathering, the theoretical net effect of dissolution and precipitation is 1 mol of CO_{2} sequestered for every mol of Ca^{2+} or Mg^{2+} weathered out of the mineral. Given that some of the dissolved cations react with existing alkalinity in the solution to form CO_{3}^{2−} ions, the ratio is not exactly 1:1 in natural systems but is a function of temperature and CO_{2} partial pressure. The net CO_{2} sequestration of carbonate weathering reaction and carbonate precipitation reaction is zero.

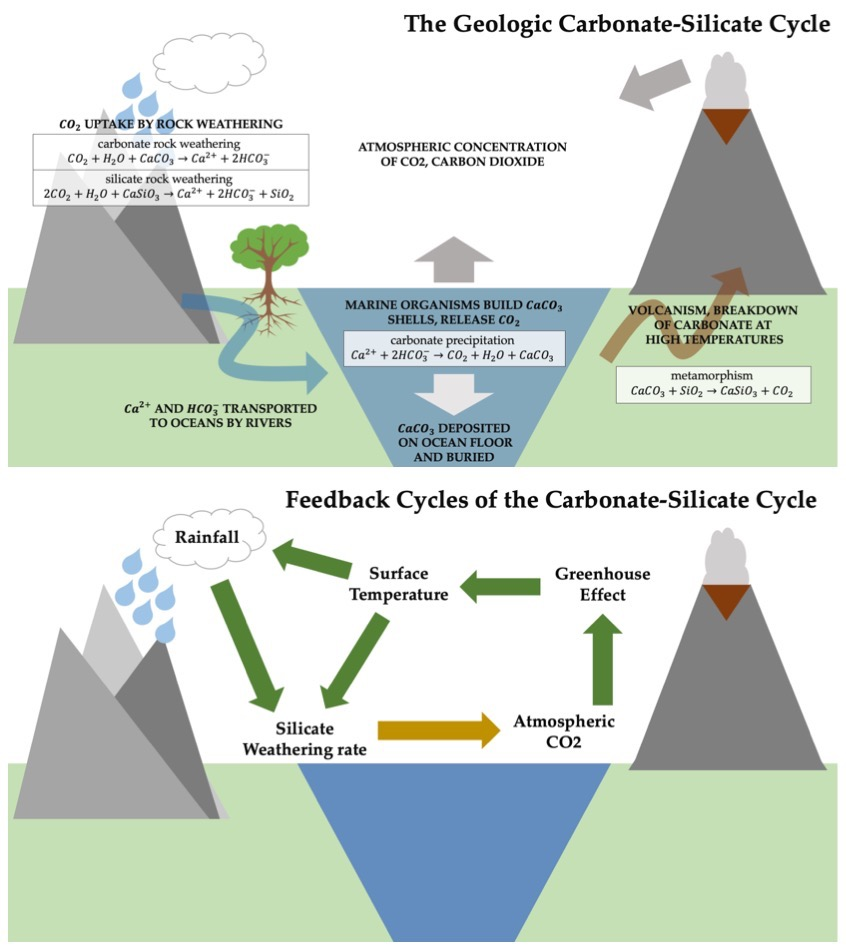
Carbon-silicate cycle feedbacks.

Weathering and biological carbonate precipitation are thought to be only loosely coupled in short time periods (<1000 years). Therefore, an increase in both carbonate and silicate weathering with respect to carbonate precipitation will result in a buildup of alkalinity in the ocean.

== Terrestrial enhanced weathering ==
Enhanced weathering was initially used to refer specifically to the spreading of crushed silicate minerals on the land surface. Next to geochemical constraints, i.e., the reactive surface area of the rock feedstock, and the solution pH and pH buffer capacity of the receiving soil, the biological activity in soils has been shown to promote the dissolution of silicate minerals, but there is still uncertainty surrounding how quickly this may happen. Because the weathering rate is a function of saturation of the dissolving mineral in solution (decreasing to zero in fully saturated solutions), some have suggested that lack of rainfall may limit terrestrial enhanced weathering, although others suggest that secondary mineral formation or biological uptake may suppress saturation and promote weathering.

The amount of energy that is required for comminution depends on the rate at which the minerals dissolve (less comminution is required for rapid mineral dissolution). A 2012 study suggested a large range in potential cost of enhanced weathering, largely due to the uncertainty surrounding mineral dissolution rates.

== Oceanic enhanced weathering ==
To overcome the limitations of solution saturation and to use natural comminution of sand particles from wave energy, silicate minerals may be applied to coastal environments, although the higher pH of seawater may substantially decrease the rate of dissolution, and it is unclear how much comminution is possible from wave action.

Alternatively, the direct application of carbonate minerals to the upwelling regions of the ocean has been investigated. Carbonate minerals are supersaturated in the surface ocean but are undersaturated in the deep ocean. In areas of upwelling, this undersaturated water is brought to the surface. While this technology will likely be cheap, the maximum annual CO_{2} sequestration potential is limited.

Transforming the carbonate minerals into oxides and spreading this material in the open ocean ('Ocean Liming') has been proposed as an alternative technology. Here the carbonate mineral (CaCO_{3}) is transformed into lime (CaO) through calcination. The energy requirements for this technology are substantial.

A "buried nuclear explosion in a remote basaltic seabed for pulverizing basalt" has been also proposed for enhanced weathering.

== Mineral carbonation ==
The enhanced dissolution and carbonation of silicates ("mineral carbonation") was first proposed by Seifritz in 1990, and developed initially by Lackner et al. and further by the Albany Research Center. This early research investigated the carbonation of extracted and crushed silicates at elevated temperatures (~180 °C) and partial pressures of CO_{2} (~15 MPa) inside controlled reactors ("ex-situ mineral carbonation"). Some research explores the potential of "in-situ mineral carbonation" in which the CO_{2} is injected into silicate rock formations to promote carbonate formation underground (see Carbfix).

Mineral carbonation research has largely focused on the sequestration of CO_{2} from flue gas. It could be used for geoengineering if the source of CO_{2} was derived from the atmosphere, e.g. through direct air capture or biomass-CCS.

Soil remineralization contributes to the enhanced weathering process. Mixing the soil with crushed rock such as silicate benefits not only the health of plants, but also carbon sequestration when calcium or magnesium are present. Remineralize The Earth is a non-profit organization that promotes rock dust applications as natural fertilizers in agricultural fields to restore soils with minerals, improve the quality of vegetation, and increase carbon sequestration.

== Electrolytic dissolution of silicate minerals ==
Where abundant electric surplus electricity is available, the electrolytic dissolution of silicate minerals has been proposed and experimentally shown. The process resembles the weathering of some minerals. In addition, hydrogen produced would be a carbon-negative.

== Nuclear enhanced weathering ==
Given the large amount of energy required for enhanced rock weathering, it has been proposed nuclear weapons could be the most feasible option. The working paper "Nuclear Explosions for Large Scale Carbon Sequestration" suggests detonating a very large yield nuclear weapon (81 Gt) on a remote basalt-rich seafloor, in order to pulverize it, so it can capture large amounts of CO_{2}.

While a radical solution, it is argued that the impacts of such a blast would be localized and contained by the ocean, and while striking, the ecological and human damage would be tiny compared to allowing climate change to continue.

== Cost ==
In a 2020 techno-economical analysis, the cost of utilizing this method on cropland was estimated at US$80–180 per tonne of CO_{2}. This is comparable with other methods of removing carbon dioxide from the atmosphere currently available (BECCS (US$100–200 per tonne of CO_{2}) – Bio-Energy with Carbon Capture and Storage) and direct air capture and storage at large scale deployment and low-cost energy inputs (US$100–300 per tonne of CO_{2}). In contrast, the cost of reforestation was estimated as lower than US$100 per tonne of CO_{2}.

For nuclear enhanced weathering, capturing 30 years worth of CO_{2} emissions (1.08 trillion tons) would cost approximately $10 billion, working out to a cost of 0,000926 cents per ton of CO_{2}, making it extremely affordable.

== Example projects ==
Alt Carbon, based in India, is a deep tech science and data company, building agri infrastructure for Planetary Intelligence. They work with farmers and scientists in the Global South to turn underutilized land into carbon sinks. As part of their Darjeeling Revival Project, they source waste basalt rock from mines and spread it across agricultural fields. When rainwater dissolves basalt, it improves soil pH, releases essential nutrients, enhances structure and moisture retention, and simultaneously reacts with CO₂ to form bicarbonates. In November 2025, Alt Carbon delivered Asia's largest ERW credit issuance to Japanese shipping giant Mitsui O.S.K. Lines.

Mati Carbon, based in Houston, uses enhanced rock weathering by applying crushed basalt to farmland. The process reacts with carbon dioxide and water to form bicarbonate. Its projects have involved farms in India, Zambia, and Tanzania.

UNDO, a UK-based Enhanced Weathering company, spreads crushed silicate rock, such as basalt and wollastonite, on agricultural land in the United Kingdom, Canada, and Australia. They claim to have spread more than 200,000 tonnes of crushed rock to date, which will capture over 40,000 tonnes of CO_{2} as their rock weathers. In March 2024, they published a peer-reviewed paper in partnership with Newcastle University in the PLOS ONE journal concerning the agronomic co-benefits of crushed basalt in a temperate climate. They were one of 20 finalists in XPRIZE Carbon Removal, a $100 million competition hosted by the Musk Foundation.

An Irish company named Silicate has run trials in Ireland and in 2023 was running trials in the USA near Chicago. Using concrete crushed down to dust scattered on farmland in the ratio of 500 tonnes to 50 hectares, they aimed to capture 100 tonnes of CO_{2} per annum from that area. Claiming it improves soil quality and crop productivity, the company sells carbon removal credits to fund the costs. The initial pilot funding comes from prize money awarded to the startup by the THRIVE/Shell Climate-Smart Agriculture Challenge.

== See also ==
- Olivine § Experimental uses
