= Synergistic gardening =

Synergistic gardening is a system of organic gardening, developed by Emilia Hazelip. The system is strongly influenced by permaculture, as well as the work of Masanobu Fukuoka and Marc Bonfils.

After establishing the garden, there is no further digging, ploughing or tilling, and no use of external inputs such as manures and other fertilizers, or pesticides. Soil health is maintained by the selection of plants, mulching, and recycling of plant residues.
