= Nora I. Goreau =

Marine biologist

Nora Goreau, born Nora Isabel Arango de Urriola (April 25, 1921 Panama City, Panama – December 18, 2016 Old Waterford, Vermont), also known as “Mother of Coral Reef Science” was Panama's first marine biologist.

== Life and career ==
While studying at the University of Panama Law School, she was offered a scholarship to study biology in the United States. She attended Coe College, University of Iowa, De Paul University, and did doctoral research in neurophysiology at the University of Chicago. Her first published paper was in 1949 on Inhibition of Brain Dehydrogenases by Acetylcholinesterases. She met her future husband Thomas F. Goreau while studying in the US.

They moved to Jamaica so her husband could teach at the University of the West Indies Medical School. Her work focused on the anatomy, physiology, biochemistry, and histology of coral reef organisms she found while diving. Together, they “completed fundamental research (there), including describing the symbiotic relationship between coral and algae and pioneering the use of scuba equipment for marine studies.”

== See also ==
- Thomas J. Goreau
