= Van Rensselaer Potter =

American biochemist (1911–2001)

- Born: August 27, 1911; South Dakota, U.S.
- Died: September 6, 2001 (aged 90); Madison, Wisconsin, U.S.
- Education: South Dakota State University (B.S.); University of Wisconsin (Ph.D.)
- Scientific career
- Fields: Biochemistry
- Doctoral advisor: Conrad Elvehjem

Van Rensselaer Potter II (12 November, 1911 – September 6, 2001) was an American biochemist, oncologist, and bioethicist. Potter was professor of oncology at the McArdle Laboratory for Cancer Research at the University of Wisconsin–Madison for more than five decades.

== Early life and education ==
Van was born on August 27, 1911, in South Dakota and was raised on the family farm. Encouraged by his father to pursue a career outside agriculture, he earned a bachelor's degree in chemistry with high honors from South Dakota State University in 1933. He subsequently moved to Madison, Wisconsin, with his wife, Vivian, and received a Ph.D. in biochemistry under the supervision of Conrad Elvehjem at the University of Wisconsin–Madison in 1938.

== Career ==
Potter's research in cancer metabolism focused on the metabolic vulnerabilities of cancer cells and demonstrated the potential of targeting multiple metabolic pathways as a therapeutic approach.

Potter is also known for his work on bioethics. Peter Whitehouse describes Potter's formulation of bioethics as a "wise integration of biology and values", which arose from his work as a cancer researcher and from the influence of faculty member Aldo Leopold at the University of Wisconsin. Bioethics is linked to environmental ethics and is separate from biomedical ethics. Because of this confusion (and appropriation of the term in medicine), Potter chose to use the term global bioethics in 1988.

He was an elected member of the National Academy of Sciences, The president of the American Society of Cell Biology in 1965, and the president of the American Association for Cancer Research in 1974-1975.

== Awards ==
- Bristol-Myers Squibb Awards (1981)
- Pfizer Award in Enzyme Chemistry (1947)
- List of Ten Outstanding Young Americans (1945)

== Publications ==
=== Popular ===
- Bioethics: Bridge to the Future (Prentice-Hall, 1971)
- Global Bioethics: Building on the Leopold Legacy (Michigan State Univ Pr 1988) ISBN 0-87013-264-4

== See also ==
- Geotherapy
