= Lorraine Remer =

Research professor

Lorraine Ann Remer
- Education: University of California, Davis
- Scientific career
- Workplaces: NASA, University of Maryland Baltimore County
- Thesis: Cloud-radiative feedbacks in tropical convection (1991)

Lorraine Remer is research professor at University of Maryland, Baltimore County known for her work on developing algorithms to study aerosol particles using satellites with a particular focus on how aerosols impact climate processes.

== Education and career ==
Remer has a B.S. in Atmospheric Science from the University of California Davis (1980), an M.S. in Oceanography from Scripps Institution of Oceanography, University of California, San Diego (1983), and a Ph.D. in Atmospheric Science from University of California Davis (1991).

Starting in 1991, she worked for Science Systems and Applications, Inc. as a support scientist at the National Aeronautics and Space Agency (NASA). From 1998 to 2012, she worked at NASA's Goddard Space Flight Center. In 2012, she moved to the University of Maryland, Baltimore Country where she became a research professor in the Joint Center for Earth Systems Technology.

She co-founded AirPhoton, a company whose work includes measuring particles in the atmosphere, and she currently serves as the company's Chief Science Officer. AirPhoton's work includes characterizing the particles found in pollution from a space-based platform.

== Research ==
As a child, Remer was interested in the sea and maritime studies, and as she grew older she sought out "environmental science that was hard science" which led her to atmospheric sciences.

Remer's research involves tracking dust in the air using space-based platforms and quantifies how aerosols alter climate conditions. While at NASA, Remer worked on the algorithms needed to understand aerosol particles using the Moderate Resolution Imaging Spectroradiometer (MODIS) sensors that are part of the payload on the Terra and Aqua satellites. Remer's research includes work on smoke, dust, aerosol particles over Atlantic Ocean and smoke and clouds in the Amazon River area. Remer has also been involved in research quantifying the balance of pollution from US-based sites relative to other geographical regions.

=== Selected publications ===
- Remer, L. A.; Kaufman, Y. J.; Tanré, D.; Mattoo, S.; Chu, D. A.; Martins, J. V.; Li, R.-R.; Ichoku, C.; Levy, R. C.; Kleidman, R. G.; Eck, T. F. (2005-04-01). "The MODIS Aerosol Algorithm, Products, and Validation". Journal of the Atmospheric Sciences. 62 (4): 947–973. Bibcode:2005JAtS...62..947R. doi:10.1175/JAS3385.1. hdl:2060/20030102194. ISSN 0022-4928. S2CID 10155517.
- Remer, Lorraine A.; Kleidman, Richard G.; Levy, Robert C.; Kaufman, Yoram J.; Tanré, Didier; Mattoo, Shana; Martins, J. Vanderlei; Ichoku, Charles; Koren, Ilan; Yu, Hongbin; Holben, Brent N. (2008). "Global aerosol climatology from the MODIS satellite sensors". Journal of Geophysical Research: Atmospheres. 113 (D14). Bibcode:2008JGRD..11314S07R. doi:10.1029/2007JD009661. ISSN 2156-2202.
- Remer, L. A.; Tanré, D.; Kaufman, Y. J.; Ichoku, C.; Mattoo, S.; Levy, R.; Chu, D. A.; Holben, B.; Dubovik, O.; Smirnov, A.; Martins, J. V. (2002). "Validation of MODIS aerosol retrieval over ocean". Geophysical Research Letters. 29 (12): MOD3–1–MOD3-4. Bibcode:2002GeoRL..29.8008R. doi:10.1029/2001GL013204. hdl:2060/20020008210. ISSN 1944-8007.

== Awards and honors ==
- June Bacon-Bercey Scholarship for Women in Atmospheric Sciences (1986)
- Thomson Reuters Highly Cited Researchers list (2014)
- Fellow, American Geophysical Union (2015)
- Faculty Excellence Award, University of Maryland, Baltimore County (2019)
