= Massachusetts Society for Promoting Agriculture =

American agricultural society

The Massachusetts Society for Promoting Agriculture (M.S.P.A.) is one of the earliest agricultural societies in the United States. The Society was incorporated by an act of the Commonwealth of Massachusetts on March 7, 1792. The Society's founding members included Samuel Adams, Charles Bulfinch, Timothy Pickering, Benjamin Lincoln, Christopher Gore, and Benjamin Guild.

== History ==
The Massachusetts Society for Promoting Agriculture was established to promote the study and experimentation of agricultural endeavors. The M.S.P.A. historically has given handsome premiums to individuals who made useful discoveries in the field and communicated these improvements to the general public.

=== Premiums ===
The first premiums (prizes) offered by the MSPA were $50 for "the most satisfactory account of the natural history of the canker-worm" and $100 for the cheapest and most effective method of eradicating it. Premiums were also offered for the cultivation of wheat and other grains; the improvement of land, including the reclamation of salt marshes; the raising of trees; the greatest stock maintained on the least land; the best vegetable food for wintering stock; the most and best wool from a given number of sheep; the best process for making cider, maple sugar, butter, cheese, flax, and salted provisions; and for the best farm journals, manures, tree plantations, advances in ploughs and ploughing techniques, and farms in general.

Grants are offered for projects that benefit the agriculture practiced in Massachusetts in a manner that is both economically and environmentally sound; that will broaden the knowledge of and support for farmers and farming in Massachusetts; that would not be likely to receive funding from government or corporate sources, but where a grant from the Society would enhance the chances of such funding by way of matching grants; or that would stimulate research in new areas.

== Timeline ==
March 7, 1792
The society was incorporated by an act of the Commonwealth of Massachusetts.
April 19, 1792
Samuel Adams authorized the first meeting of the society to be held in the town of Boston. John Avery, Jr. was elected secretary of the society pro tem. Seventy-two new members were admitted to the society.
June 14, 1792
The organization of the society was completed at the adjourned meeting of this date.
August 3, 1792
The organization of the society was completed at the adjourned meeting of this date. August 3 1792 The first meeting of the trustees was held. It was voted to publish in the newspaper an announcement that the society was now organized, the board would meet monthly, and be soliciting communications in all agriculture interests of the society.
October 3, 1792
The first semi-annual meeting of the society was held. John Hancock was admitted to the society.

== Publications ==
In 1813, the M.S.P.A. began publishing semi-annually the Massachusetts Agricultural Journal, which was discontinued in 1827 when the publication of various weekly farming journals supplanted the need for a semi-annual one.
