= Wolf Hilbertz =

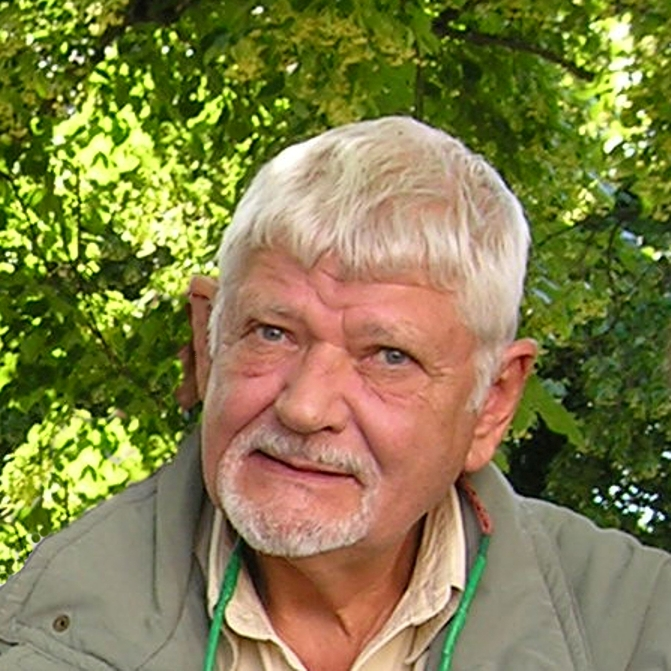
Wolf Hilbertz July 2005

Wolf Hartmut Hilbertz (April 16, 1938 – August 11, 2007) was a German-born futurist architect, inventor, and marine scientist. Notable contributions to science include the discovery of artificial mineral accretion / biorock and its use to create artificial reefs and other structures using electricity to attract materials already found in ocean water.

== Personal life ==
=== Early life ===
Wolf Hilbertz was born in Gütersloh, (Germany) in 1938, the first child of Rudolf Hilbertz (1909–1995) and Erna Hilbertz, née Uslat (1906–2008). His parents had quite different personalities; whereas his father was artistic and inventive, thinking up one of the first electric razors, his mother had a more down to earth, practical approach. While his father would have liked to become an artist, circumstances forced him to start working in a bank, whereas his mother enjoyed her occupation, channeling her forceful personality into her job as a school teacher.

After Wolf Hilbertz was born, the family moved to Ústí nad Labem / Aussig in the Czech Republic. When World War II began, his father volunteered for the Wehrmacht and became a member of the Brandenburger special forces. Wolf's sister Uta was born in 1940. His father was badly wounded in Greece in 1944 and fled from the Red Army with his family towards the west in 1945.

As war refugees, he and his family settled in Detmold, Germany in 1946. He attended the Gymnasium (secondary school) there, which he didn't complete. This would normally have precluded his attending a German university. However, after completing his compulsory military service, he went to Berlin in 1959 and signed up for a high school equivalency entrance exam. He was one of the very few to earn a "pass". Thus he was able to attend the Hochschule der Künste Berlin, the Berlin University of the Arts, where he studied architecture. He married Regina Piper in December, 1962 in Berlin and, upon earning his architecture diploma in 1965, immigrated to New York City with his family in July of that year. 1966 he moved to Ann Arbor, Michigan, where he earned his Masters of Architecture at the University of Michigan in 1967.

=== Final years ===
After suffering what were initially diagnosed as stomach problems in the spring and summer of 2007, he was diagnosed with terminal lung cancer at the end of July. Hilbertz died August 11, 2007, in Munich. He was survived by his mother († 2008), sister, his wife and two ex-wives, and five children: two sons and three daughters. The urn with his ashes was buried at the cemetery "Städtischer Friedhof Wilmersdorf" in Berlin.

== Professional career ==
Hilbertz worked in architects' offices in Berlin, New York, and Detroit. His first teaching position was in 1967 as an assistant professor at Southern University in Baton Rouge, Louisiana. Together with Phil Harding, he founded a new Architecture Department at the University. After several years there, he conceived and published the concept of Cybertecture.

In 1970 he was appointed to the faculty of the School of Architecture at the University of Texas, along with several other highly innovative new faculty, by then-Dean Alan Y. Taniguchi (1969–1972). At the University of Texas, he founded the Responsive Environments Laboratory, where he and his students developed and extended his thinking about the automated creation of the built environment. Within a very few years, he was tenured as a full professor for his work. After several years, the focus of the lab shifted to the construction of underwater structures by a method not unlike that used by living corals. The material produced has since become commonly known as accretion, seacrete or biorock.

Hilbertz' work was influenced by and influenced the work of such notables as Nicholas Negroponte. Important students and associates include Joe Mathis, Bob Swaffar, Gene Lucas, Geoffrey Wright, Forrest Higgs, Frances Carvey, Eric Vanderzee, Ed Seiber, Dr. Thomas J. Goreau, Frank Gutzeit and Ari Spenhoff.

Hilbertz laid the foundation for the discipline of Cybertecture, emergent all-encompassing evolutionary environmental systems, and invented the artificial mineral accretion process in seawater in 1976. For the rest of the 1970s, he concentrated more and more on accretion, continuing to develop and refine the process. By the time he left the University of Texas in the early 1980s, accretion had become the sole focus of his work. Starting in the late 1980s, he partnered with Dr. Thomas J. Goreau to install, maintain and monitor accretion / biorock projects in many countries.

He published extensively on his research-and-development work. He lectured widely in the Americas, Europe, and Asia, conducting hands-on workshops. His work has been exhibited on several continents. He authored several US and international patents. In 1998 he and Dr. Thomas Goreau were awarded the Theodore M. Sperry Award for Pioneers and Innovators, the top award of the Society for Ecological Restoration.

With the help of a host of dedicated associates, students, and volunteers, Hilbertz designed and implemented seascaping projects focusing on coral conservation / fish habitat, mariculture, and erosion control. Whenever possible, this was done with direct local government or community involvement and participation. Ongoing projects and concerns were the production of building materials and components, metals, minerals and gases from seawater, direct or indirect solar energy conversion, sustainable brine use and model seacology artificial/natural islands like Autopia Saya. The Autopia Saya Project in the Indian Ocean was initiated in 1997 and continued in 2002. After his death, work on accretion projects has continued.

His academic affiliations as an environmental educator and researcher included Southern University, McGill University, the University of the Arts Bremen, and The University of Texas, where he also held an appointment as Sr. Research Scientist in Marine Sciences. He founded the Symbiotic Processes Laboratory (UT). Hilbertz formed and directed The Marine Resources Co., was a co-founder and Director of Biorock Inc., and founder and President of Sun & Sea e.V., a non-profit NGO.

== Published works ==
- Toward Cybertecture, in: Progressive Architecture, May 1970
- Hilbertz, Wolf (1976). "Marine Architecture: An Alternative". Architectural Science Review. 19 (4). Informa UK Limited: 84–86. doi:10.1080/00038628.1976.9697227. ISSN 0003-8628.
- Mineral accretion technology: applications for architecture and aquaculture with D. Fletcher und C. Krausse, Industrial Forum, 1977
- Building Environments That Grow, in: The Futurist (June 1977): 148–49
- Hilbertz, W. (1979). "Electrodeposition of minerals in sea water: Experiments and applications". IEEE Journal of Oceanic Engineering. 4 (3). Institute of Electrical and Electronics Engineers (IEEE): 94–113. Bibcode:1979IJOE....4...94H. doi:10.1109/joe.1979.1145428. ISSN 0364-9059.
- Hilbertz, Wolf H. (1991). "Solar-generated construction material from sea water to mitigate global warming". Building Research & Information. 19 (4). Informa UK Limited: 242–255. Bibcode:1991BuRI...19..242H. doi:10.1080/09613219108727135. ISSN 0961-3218.
- Solar-generated building material from seawater as a sink for carbon, Ambio 1992
