= Biorock =

Engineering material

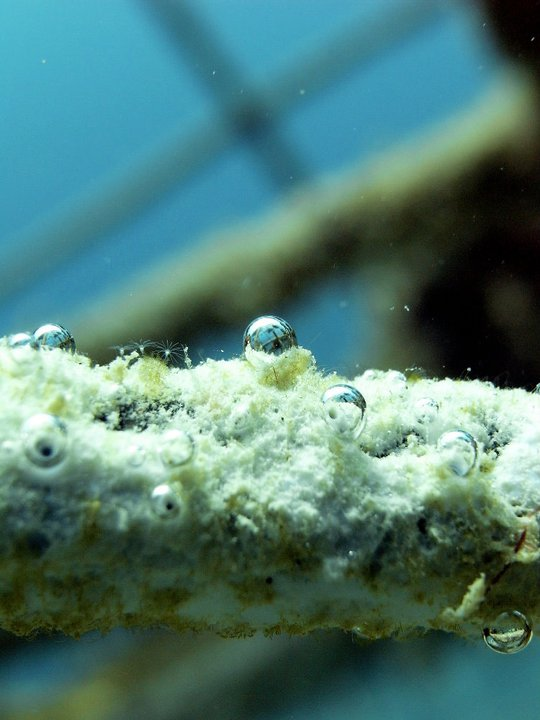
Biorock forming on rebar in seawater in the presence of a small electric current to form an electrified reef

Biorock (also seacrete) is a cement-like engineering material formed when a small electric current is passed between underwater metal electrodes placed in seawater causing dissolved minerals to accrete onto the cathode to form a thick layer of limestone. This 'accretion process' can be used to create building materials or to create artificial 'electrified reefs' for the benefit of corals and other sea-life. Discovered by Wolf Hilbertz in 1976, biorock was protected by patents and a trademark which have now expired.

== History ==
During the 1970s, Professor Wolf Hilbertz, an architect by training, was studying seashells and reefs at the School of Architecture at the University of Texas at Austin. He was thinking about how humans could emulate the way coral grows. After preliminary work in 1975, he discovered the year after that by passing electric currents through salt water, over time, a thick layer of various materials, including limestone, deposited on the cathode. Later experiments showed that the coating could thicken at the rate of 5 cm per year for as long as current flows.

Hilbertz's original plan was to use this technology to grow low-cost structures in the ocean. He detailed his basic theory in a technical journal in 1979, believing that the process should not be patented so that anyone could commercially exploit it. However, having been let down a number of times, he incorporated a company, The Marine Resources Company, raised venture capital and filed a number of patents relating to biorock.

He dissolved Marine Resources Company in 1982 as his focus shifted to creating artificial coral reefs (or electrified reefs) after meeting Thomas J. Goreau. Hilbertz formed a partnership with Goreau, who continued work on coral reef restoration and biorock after Hilbertz died in 2007.

== Process ==
The chemical process that takes place on the cathode is as follows: Calcium carbonate (aragonite) combines with magnesium, chloride and hydroxyl ions to slowly accrete around the cathode coating it with a thick layer of material similar in composition to magnesium oxychloride cement. Over time, cathodic protection replaces the negative chloride ion (Cl-) with dissolved bicarbonate (HCO3-) to harden the coating to a hydromagnesite-aragonite mixture with gaseous oxygen evolving through the porous structure. Compressive strength has been measured from 3,720 to 5,350 psi (25.6 to 36.9 MPa), comparable to the concrete used for sidewalks. The material grows rapidly, strengthens with age, and is self-repairing whilst power is applied. The process is one that emits carbon dioxide into the atmosphere rather than sequestering it.

The electrical current, supplied by a low DC voltage (often <4 volts) at a low current, is required on a continuous, pulsed, or intermittent basis, which can therefore be generated nearby from a low-cost integrated renewable energy source such as a small floating solar panel array. One kilowatt hour of electricity accretes about 0.4 to 1.5 kilograms (0.9 to 3.3 lb) of biorock, depending on parameters such as depth, electric current, salinity and water temperature.

== Electrified reef ==
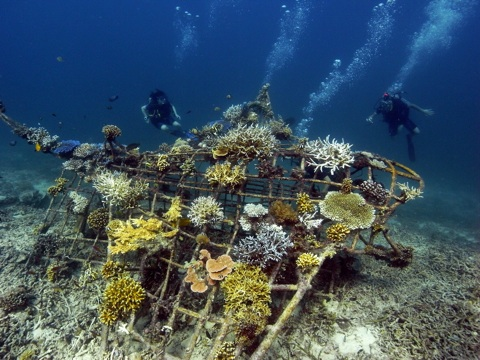
A newly constructed electrified reef set up by Gili Eco Trust in Indonesia.

Electrified reefs can be constructed using the Biorock process, which provides a substrate on which corals thrive, being very similar to that of a natural reef. The structural element of the reef can be constructed out of low-cost rebar metal, on which the rock will form, which can be created locally in a shape appropriate to the location and purpose. Power is supplied between this large metal structure (the cathode) and a much smaller anode. Coral also benefits from the electrified and oxygenated reef environment that forms around the cathode. High levels of dissolved oxygen make it highly attractive to marine organisms, particularly fin fish.

== Patents ==
- US 4246075 "Mineral accretion of large surface structures, building components and elements" 1981 (expired)
- US 4440605 "Repair of reinforced concrete structures by mineral accretion" 1984 (expired)
- US 4461684 "Accretion coating and mineralization of materials for protection against biodegradation" 1984 (expired)
- US 5543034 "Method of enhancing the growth of aquatic organisms, and structures created thereby" 1996 (expired)

== Trademark ==
The term Biorock was protected by a trademark between 2000 and 2010, but can now be used without restriction.

== Published works ==
- Hilbertz, W. H., Marine architecture: an alternative, in: Arch. Sci. Rev., 1976
- Hilbertz, W. H., Mineral accretion technology: applications for architecture and aquaculture with D. Fletcher und C. Krausse, Industrial Forum, 1977
- Hilbertz, W. H., Building Environments That Grow, in: The Futurist (June 1977): 148-49
- Hilbertz, W. H. et al., Electrodeposition of Minerals in Sea Water: Experiments and Applications, in: IEEE Journal on Oceanic Engineering, Vol. OE-4, No. 3, pp. 94–113, 1979
- Ortega, Alvaro, Basic Technology: Mineral Accretion for Shelter. Seawater as a Source for Building, MIMAR 32: Architecture in Development, No. 32, pp. 60–63, 1989
- Hilbertz, W. H., Solar-generated construction material from sea water to mitigate global warming, in: Building Research & Information, Volume 19, Issue 4 July 1991, pages 242 - 255
- Hilbertz, W. H., Solar-generated building material from seawater as a sink for carbon, Ambio 1992
- Balbosa, Enrique Amat, Revista Arquitectura y Urbanismo, Vol. 15, no. 243, 1994
- Goreau, T. J. + Hilbertz, W. H. + Evans, S. + Goreau, P. + Gutzeit, F. + Despaigne, C. + Henderson, C. + Mekie, C. + Obrist, R. + Kubitza, H., Saya de Malha Expedition, March 2002, 101 p., Sun&Sea e.V. Hamburg, Germany, August 2002
