= Emilia Hazelip =

Spanish scientist (1937–2003)

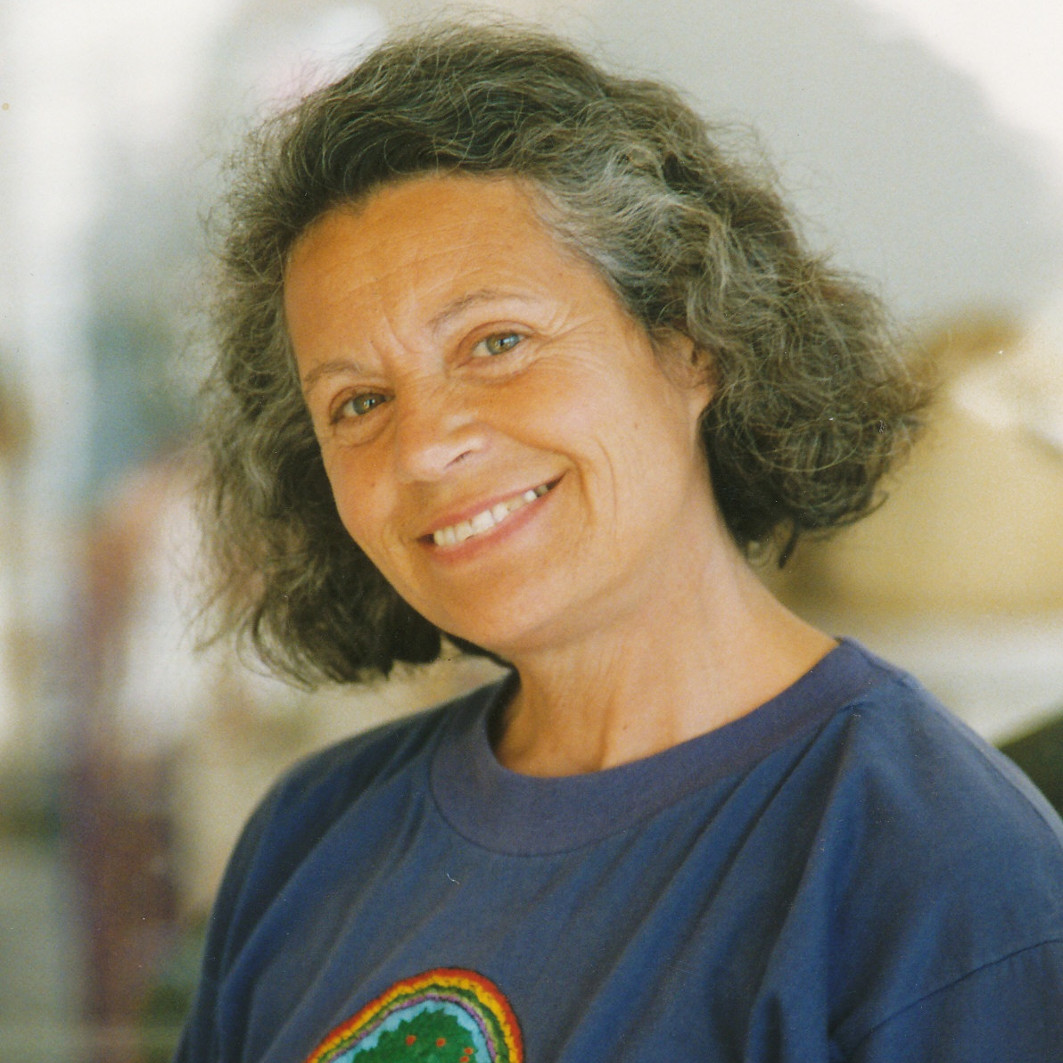
Emilia Hazelip

Emilia Hazelip (born Emilia Espinosa, Barcelona, Spain, 18 July 1937 - Carcassonne, France, 2 February 2003) was a Catalan organic gardener, former Merry Prankster, and pioneer of the concept of synergistic gardening. Her farming methods were inspired by Masanobu Fukuoka after reading his book; The One-Straw Revolution in 1978 after it was first translated into English.
