= Thomas F. Goreau =

Thomas Fritz Goreau (August 16, 1924 in Germany - April 22, 1970 in New York) was a marine biologist who worked extensively on the coral reefs of Jamaica, and many other reefs in the Pacific, Caribbean, and Red Sea. He is the son of renowned science photographer Fritz Goro.

== Career ==
Goreau moved from Germany to Austria at the age of 8, and lived in France and the United States, where he studied at Clark University, The University of Pennsylvania Medical School, and received his Ph.D in ecology from Yale University. In 1951 he went to lecture at the medical school at the University of the West Indies in Jamaica, and in 1956 he founded a long-term research project exploring the coral reefs of Jamaica.

== Death ==
His work on coral reefs began in 1947, when, as a student, he became involved with the Bikini Atoll atom bomb test site in the Marshall Islands as a chemist. As the diver who collected radioactive specimens from the lagoons, he most likely received lethal radiation exposure. Consequently, he died from cancer at the age of 45.

== Legacy ==
He built rebreather diving gear to explore the deep sea, and was the first diving marine scientist. He founded the marine laboratory at Discovery Bay, Jamaica in an abandoned urinal on a fisherman's beach in the early 1960s. The fame of his research, which pioneered most of the techniques used in modern coral reef science, led to the construction of a research lab that opened only after his death in 1970.

He pioneered the use of scuba gear as a marine research tool, the use of radioisotopes to understand the growth of corals and marine organisms, the zonation of coral reefs, and many aspects of coral reef ecology and geology. With Nora I. Goreau he did the basic work on the biology and physiology of corals and the role of algal symbiosis in their growth. They discovered many new species, and explored many other subjects. Their work showed how coral reefs function and established their great sensitivity to environmental stress. His widow Nora I. Goreau, the first Panamanian marine biologist, and son Thomas J. Goreau continue to focus their research on coral reefs.

== Notes and references ==
=== Bibliography ===
- Lothar Böhm (1971). "Professor Dr. Thomas Fritz Goreau. August 16, 1924 †-† April 22, 1970". Internationale Revue der Gesamten Hydrobiologie und Hydrographie. 56 (2): 321–323. doi:10.1002/iroh.19710560210.
