= Rockdust =

Crushed rock used in mines

Rock dust is a pulverized rock, usually limestone, sprayed on walls inside underground coal mines to prevent coal dust explosions. The dust acts as a heat sink, keeps coal dust levels down, and prevents black lung disease. Rock dust has been used since the early 1900s, but technological improvements have occurred.

U.S. federal regulations require that rock dust be applied in all underground coal mine areas to mitigate the propagation of a coal dust explosion. Before September 2010, U.S. federal regulation 30 CFR 75.403 mandated that the nation's coal mines maintain a total incombustible content (TIC) of at least 65% in nonreturn entries and at least 80% in the return airways. In September 2010, the U.S. Mine Safety and Health Administration (MSHA) published an emergency temporary standard increasing the total incombustible requirement in intake airways to 80%, effective June 21, 2011. The 65% TIC requirement was based on an average particle size termed "mine-size dust," derived from representative samples collected from mines in the 1920s. To determine compliance with federal regulations, mine inspectors systematically collect dust samples from sections of underground coal mines and send them to the MSHA National Air and Dust Laboratory at Mount Hope, West Virginia for analysis of incombustible content.
