= Thomas J. Goreau =

Biogeochemist and marine biologist

- Education: Massachusetts Institute of Technology, California Institute of Technology & Harvard University
- Occupation: Biogeochemist

Thomas J. Goreau (Tom Goreau, * 1950 in Jamaica) is a biogeochemist and marine biologist. He is the son of two other renowned marine biologists, Thomas F. Goreau and Nora I. Goreau.

== Education ==
After studying in Jamaican primary and secondary schools, he received an undergraduate degree in planetary physics from the Massachusetts Institute of Technology (BS, 1970). He went on to earn a Master of Science in planetary astronomy from the California Institute of Technology (1972) and a Ph.D. in biogeochemistry from Harvard University (1981).

== Career ==
With his parents, he researched the coral reefs of Jamaica and continues to conduct research on the impacts of global climate change, pollution, and new diseases in reefs across the Caribbean, Indian Ocean, and Pacific. His current work focuses on coral reef restoration, fisheries restoration, shoreline protection, renewable energy, community-based coral reef management, mariculture, soil metabolism, soil carbon, and stabilization of global carbon dioxide. He was formerly Senior Scientific Affairs Officer at the United Nations Centre for Science and Technology for Development. He is currently President of the Global Coral Reef Alliance and Director of Remineralize The Earth.

== See also ==
- Biorock
- Remineralize The Earth
