= List of Jamaican inventions and discoveries =

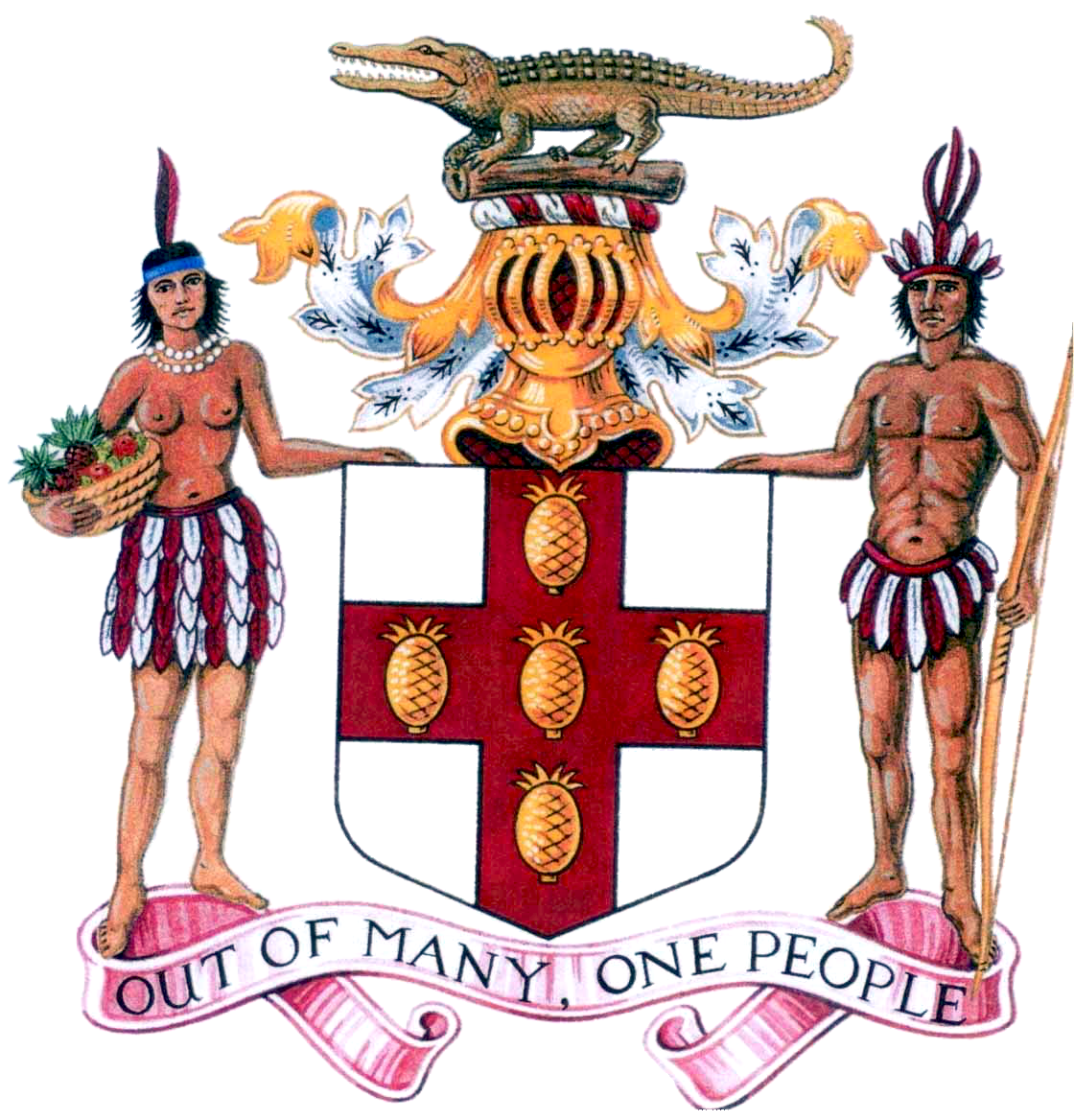

Jamaican inventions and discoveries are items, processes, ideas, techniques or discoveries which owe their existence either partially or entirely to a person born in Jamaica, or to a citizen of Jamaica or to a person born abroad of Jamaican heritage.

== Agriculture ==
- Ortanique, a hybrid of orange and tangerine, by David Daniel Phillips and Charles Jackson.
- Jamaica Hope, a tropical dairy breed noted for high milk yield and heat tolerance, by Thomas Lecky.
- Jamaica Red, a beef cattle breed suited to Jamaica’s hilly terrain, by Thomas Lecky.
- Jamaica Black, a beef breed adapted to Jamaica’s cooler areas, by Thomas Lecky.
- Jamaica Brahman, used to develop the Jamaica Black and Red, by Thomas Lecky.
- Sorrel Deseeder, the first machine to automate the difficult task of separating sorrel calyces from seed pods, by Oral and Allison Turner.

== Astronomy and astrophysics ==
- First in astronomy to apply the technique of spectroscopic tomography, by Mercedes Richards.
- First to discover and image starspots on the cool star in an Algol-type binary system, by Mercedes Richards.
- First to image gas flows between stars in interacting binary systems, by Mercedes Richards.
- First to image chromospheres and accretion structures in Algol binary systems, by Mercedes Richards.
- First to show, through imaging, that gas flows in interacting binaries follow gravitationally predicted trajectories, by Mercedes Richards.
- First astronomer to make theoretical hydrodynamic simulations of Algol-type binary stars, by Mercedes Richards.
- First to apply novel distance correlation statistical methods to large astronomical databases, by Mercedes Richards.
  - Ackee Wine – A fruit wine made from Blighia sapida, Jamaica's national fruit. The first commercial Ackee wine was invented by Jamaican entrepreneur and retired pilot Howard Coxe in 2011, as founder and managing director of Journey's End Wine Company Ltd. and its brand Flavours of the Past. The wine was showcased at Expo Jamaica 2014.

== Biology and medicine ==
- First comprehensive metagenomic study of the human intestinal microbiome, by Karen Nelson.
- First Caribbean prostate cancer cell line (ACRJ-PC28), by Simone Badal McCreath.
- First to use prophylactic antibiotics to treat children with sickle cell anaemia, by Yvette Francis-McBarnette.
- Discovery of Kwashiorkor, a protein deficiency disease, by Cicely Williams.
- Discovery of Monamycin, an antibiotic derived from Streptomyces jamaicensis, by Kenneth E. Magnus (and Cedric Hassall).
- Established the link between adipose tissue GLUT4 expression and insulin resistance, advancing the understanding of diabetes pathogenesis by Evan Dale Abel (and Barbara Kahn).
- Goffe strain, an attenuated measles virus strain used in global vaccines, by Alan Powell Goffe.
- Pioneering research on phasic insulin-dependent diabetes mellitus, by Errol Morrison.
- Canasol, a cannabis-based eye drop for late-stage glaucoma, by Manley West and Albert Lockhart.
- Asmasol, a cannabis-based treatment for bronchial asthma and respiratory symptoms, by Manley West and Albert Lockhart.
- Canavert, a cannabis-based treatment for motion sickness, by Manley West and Albert Lockhart.
- Alpha Prostate, a dietary supplement for prostate health management, by Henry Lowe.
- JaipurKnee, a low-cost prosthetic knee with a self-lubricating, multi-plane rotation mechanism for improved mobility and stability, co-designed by Joel Sadler.
- Ramphal Cardiac Surgery Simulator, a re-animated porcine heart model used widely in cardiothoracic training, especially in the United States, by Paul Ramphal and Daniel Coore.

== Chemistry ==
- Armed-disarmed principle, a strategy for controlling glycosylation selectivity in carbohydrate synthesis, by Bertram Fraser-Reid.
- N-pentenyl glycosides for complex carbohydrate synthesis, by Bertram Fraser-Reid.
- Synthesis of the largest hetero-oligosaccharide without automated methods, by Bertram Fraser-Reid.
- Metallocene catalysts enabling precise control of polyolefin structure, by John Alexander Ewen.
- Ewen Symmetry Rules, principles for designing catalysts to control polyolefin structure, by John Alexander Ewen.
- First to report photopolymerisation, a process using light to initiate polymer formation, by John Buddle Blyth (and August Wilhelm von Hofmann).
- First to use the term "synthesis" in its modern chemical sense, by John Buddle Blyth (and August Wilhelm von Hofmann).
- First textbook to incorporate chemical symbols and formulae as well as organic chemistry, by Edward Turner.
- Discovery of a process to chemically recycle polycarbonates while preventing BPA (bisphenol A) leaching, by Gavin Jones (and Jeannette Garcia).
- Contributed to the development of a new class of polymers, by Gavin Jones.
- Isolation of Dibenzyl Trisulphide (DTS) from guinea hen weed (Petiveria alliacea), demonstrating anti-proliferative and cytotoxic effects on various cancer cell lines, by Williams and Levy.
- Identification of DTS derivatives (e.g. DTS-albumin complexes) with anti-proliferative and cytotoxic activity against diverse cancer cell lines, by Williams and Levy.
- Development of methods to isolate and deliver DTS and its derivatives for effective anti-proliferative and cytotoxic activity on cancer cell lines, by Williams and Levy.
- Isolation of chemical compounds from ball moss (Tillandsia recurvata), demonstrating anti-cancer activity, by Henry Lowe.
- Isolation of Eryngial from Eryngium foetidum, identified as an anti-threadworm agent, by Reese, Robinson, and Forbes.
- A method for measuring absorption spectra of haematoxylin and haematein in aqueous solutions minimizing oxidation risk, by Gerald Lalor (and S.Martin).
- Invention of a specialized reaction vessel for low-temperature kinetic studies, by Gerald Lalor.

== Computing ==
- Lingo, a high-level scripting language for animation, audio, and interactivity in Adobe Director, by John Henry Thompson.
- XObjects, a programming framework for extending multimedia capabilities in Adobe Director, by John Henry Thompson.
- Methods and apparatus for managing mobile content, co-invented by John Henry Thompson.
- Pioneering work in database security and privacy, including innovations in RFID data management, privacy-preserving mobile data management, private social network analysis, text analytics, and healthcare management systems, as well as co-inventions in privacy-preserving datasets, data ingest optimization, semantic extraction for opinion monitoring, personalized healthcare systems, privacy score management, automated information discovery, and unified analytics for decision support, by Tyrone Grandison.
- IGES data format and CAD/CAM advancements for standardized digital design at Boeing, by Walt Braithwaite.

== Cuisine ==
- Chocolate milk
- Tia Maria
- Irish Moss
- Planter's punch
- Jerk
- Jamaican patty
- Red peas soup
- Run down
- Mannish water
- Hummingbird cake
- Bustamante backbone
- Coconut drop
- Bammy
- Toto
- Coco bread
- Bulla cake
- Festival

== Electronics ==
- 3K.93C connector, a fibre-optic system enabling UHD broadcast, adopted as the HDTV standard across American, Japanese, and European markets; honoured with a Technology & Engineering Emmy for its impact on live event coverage, by Glen McFarlane.

== Fashion ==
- Kariba suit, a two-piece tropical formalwear alternative to the Western suit, by Ivy Ralph.
- White bikini worn by Ursula Andress in Dr. No, co-designed by Tessa Prendergast.

== Games ==
- Nubian Jak, by Jak Beula Dodd.
- Automated Double-Dutch jump rope machine, by Tahira Reid Smith.
- Kivi (2016), co-designed by Sheyla Bonnick.
- Eye Catch (2017), co-designed by Sheyla Bonnick
- Sneak Peek (2018), co-designed by Sheyla Bonnick.
- Kalooki
- Popongo, by Errol Anderson.

== Genetics ==
- Discovery of more than three million previously unreported genetic variants, by Neil Hanchard (and team).
- Discovery of new genes associated with rare mendelian disorders, by Neil Hanchard
- Discovery of novel genes involved in the development of congenital cardiovascular disorders, by Neil Hanchard.
- A PRSV resistant transgenic local papaya (Jamaica Solo Sunrise), by Paula Tennant.

== Industrial processes ==
- Barley abrasion process, a technique that improves malting efficiency by abrading barley grains, stimulating enzyme activity for enhanced brewing, by Geoff Palmer.
- Discovery that enzymes critical to malting originate from the bran, by Geoff Palmer.
- Pioneered the use of the scanning electron microscope to study malt production in detail, by Geoff Palmer.
- A commercial process to extract quassinoids from bitterwood, by Yee and Jacobs.
- A process for extracting valuable mineral by-products from bauxite, by Lightbourne and Barclay Baetz.
- There is debate surrounding the origins and true inventor of the "Cort process", a method for producing wrought iron during the Industrial Revolution. While Henry Cort is often credited as the creator, evidence suggests that he may have appropriated the technique from Black metallurgists in Jamaica.

== Marine science ==
- Electrified reef, a coral restoration technique using low-voltage currents to stimulate growth, by Thomas J. Goreau (and Wolf Hilbertz).
- Goreau-Hayes Hotspot Method, a satellite-based technique for predicting coral bleaching via sea surface temperature anomalies, by Thomas J. Goreau (and Raymond Hayes).

== Music and arts ==
- Reggae
- Rocksteady
- Ska
- Mento
- Dub
- Dancehall
- Ragga
- Reggae fusion
- Hip-hop/rap music. Jamaican-born DJ Kool Herc is known as the "Founder of Hip-hop" and "Father of Hip-hop".
- Modern remixing of sounds.
- One drop rhythm
- Toasting
- Dub poetry
- Dinki Mini
- Bogle dance
- Bruckins
- Dutty Wine
- Butterfly dance
- Skank
- Dembow beat

== Religion, politics and ethics ==
- Rastafari
- Kumina
- Myal
- Garveyism
- Universal Negro Improvement Association and African Communities League (UNIA-ACL), founded by Marcus Garvey and Amy Ashwood Garvey.
- The League of Coloured Peoples (LCP), founded by Harold Moody
- British Cultural Studies or the Birmingham School of Cultural Studies, co-founded by Stuart Hall

== Space exploration ==
- Portable 3D nondestructive examination system, a technology for detecting material flaws using real-time tomography, by Robert Rashford (and Charles Rivera).
- Single-person spacecraft, a capsule with a pressurized crew enclosure for satellite servicing and space tourism, co-invented by Robert Rashford.
- Protective enclosure for orbital replacement units (ORUs), a lightweight system for safely transporting ORUs in space missions, by Robert Rashford.
- Spaceflight hardware enclosure, a protective system for safely transporting spacecraft components, co-invented by Robert Rashford.

== Transport ==
- Radial tyres, Jamaican-born Arthur William Savage is often cited as the inventor.
- An improved process for making inner tubes for vehicle tires, by Arthur William Savage.

== Weaponry ==
- Savage Model 99 lever-action rifle, by Arthur William Savage.
- First completely modern removable box magazine, by Arthur William Savage.

== Miscellaneous ==
- Discovery of previously unknown historical human migration patterns, by Neil Hanchard (and team).
- Discovery of a new and distinct variety of the Zingiberacae family, by Errol McGhie.
- Discoveries about the mating habits of redback spiders, by Maydianne Andrade.
- Discovery of a new species of Pisonia.
- An Agrobacterium-mediated protein expression vector designated pGD, by Michael Goodin (and Dietzgen). This contributed to the widespread use of pGD agroinfiltration as a basic tool for plant biology studies.
- Tools that scientists now use worldwide, to study interactions between viral and plant proteins at the molecular level, by Michael Goodin.
- Novel viral minireplication systems and establishment of model plant viral hosts, by Michael Goodin.
- The H2-Flex, by Harlo Mayne.
- Patented magnetic gearbox system, by George Winston Whitfield and Howard Martin Chin.
- A novel method of long multiplication, by Nira Chamberlain. His invention has been used in some UK schools.
- The Cassidy System, by Frederic G. Cassidy.
