= Science and technology in Jamaica =

The Science, Technology and Innovation (STI) sector in Jamaica is guided by two primary institutions – the National Commission on Science and Technology (NCST) and the Scientific Research Council (SRC). Both operate under the Ministry of Science, Energy, Telecommunications and Transport (MSETT).

== History ==
Jamaica’s earliest known scientific practices were those of the Taíno, a subgroup of the Arawak who migrated from South America c. AD 600–900. They detoxified cassava, farmed in conuco mounds for soil conservation and drainage, and used native plants such as Guaiacum for medicinal purposes. Some of these traditions continue to shape agriculture and medicine on the island today.

The British colonial period marked the start of institutionalised science and technology in Jamaica. In 1768, the island became the first in the Caribbean to adopt steam power for sugarcane processing, installing one of the earliest steam engines in the Americas. In 1779, the colonial government established the Bath Botanic Garden to introduce new plant species and conduct agricultural experiments in support of economic development. By 1798, Jamaica had built one of the first piped water systems in the Western Hemisphere, powered by a large Persian water wheel on the Martha Brae River. In 1845, Jamaica opened its first railway line – the second in the British colonies and among the earliest in the Western Hemisphere outside the United States – using rail technology to boost trade and connect communities. By the 1870s, innovations such as vacuum pans for sugar refining and steam‑powered mills were significantly improving the efficiency of sugarcane production. In 1879, Governor Sir Anthony Musgrave founded the Institute of Jamaica – the island’s first institution dedicated to the public dissemination of scientific knowledge. The 1890s brought another leap forward: in 1892, Kingston became one of the first cities in the world to have electricity – only thirteen years after Edison’s invention of the electric lamp. Alongside these advances, Jamaica was one of the earliest developing countries to enact measures guiding the use of science in managing its natural resources.

Post–Second World War advancements strengthened Jamaica’s science, technology, and innovation (STI) framework. The University of the West Indies (UWI), established in 1948, pioneered medical research on regional health challenges such as diabetes and sickle cell disease. Its Tropical Metabolism Research Unit, founded in 1958 and later incorporated into the Caribbean Institute for Health Research (CAIHR), made significant contributions to tropical metabolism and epidemiology. Around the same time, the Jamaica Institute of Technology was established and became the College of Arts, Science and Technology (CAST) in 1959, focusing on technical education before evolving into the University of Technology, Jamaica in 1995. In 1960, the Scientific Research Council (SRC) was established to collect, evaluate and disseminate scientific and technical knowledge, advancing research in agriculture, industry, and environmental sustainability. These institutions supported applied research and innovation, such as the work of UWI chemist Professor Kenneth Magnus, who in the late 1950s discovered the antibiotic Monamycin – named after the Mona Campus. By the early 1960s, Jamaica had the beginnings of a scientific and technical infrastructure that offered potential for supporting post‑independence national development.

== Science and technology policy ==
=== Background and Early Challenges ===
Since gaining independence in 1962, Jamaica has pursued national development through industrialisation, education reform, and public sector modernisation. Science, technology, and innovation (STI) have gradually emerged as strategic tools to support these efforts – particularly in improving productivity, expanding infrastructure and enhancing service delivery. In 1990, the government formalised its commitment to STI with the National Science and Technology Policy – laying the groundwork for integrating innovation into key sectors. In 1993, the National Commission on Science and Technology (NCST) was established to advise on and coordinate national STI policy, whilst the Scientific Research Council (SRC) promoted nationwide scientific research and its application. However, systemic challenges (such as inadequate funding, fragmented governance, and limited resources) hindered progress in subsequent decades. In 2016, the government established the Ministry of Science, Energy and Technology (MSET), followed by a Science Division in 2018 – marking a shift in national priorities by transferring Jamaica’s scientific leadership from the SRC and NCST to direct ministerial oversight. Building on this, the government intensified its focus through updated policies and national strategies to modernise infrastructure, increase investment, and better integrate STI into development goals. The overarching aim is to position Jamaica as a key contributor in information technology and scientific innovation.

=== National Development Strategy and Digital Infrastructure ===
In 2009, Jamaica launched Vision 2030, a national development plan to achieve developed status by 2030. National Outcome 11, A Technology‑Enabled Society, prioritises digital innovation and technological advancement as key drivers of economic growth. In pursuit of this vision, the government has enacted a range of policies to build digital capacity. The National Broadband Initiative, launched in December 2020, aims for universal high-speed internet access by 2025, treating connectivity as a public good. By 2021, broadband covered 77 per cent of the population, with efforts ongoing to close gaps. The Public Wi-Fi Hotspot Programme, led by the Universal Service Fund, expanded from 13 hotspots in 2021 to over 380 by mid-2025, providing free access to hundreds of thousands in townships and underserved areas to promote digital inclusion. The Data Protection Act (2020), which came into effect in December 2023, establishes a framework for responsible data management. These initiatives aim to drive digital trust, broaden access and enable innovation.

Further reforms between 2019 and 2025 focused on strengthening research capacity, public-private collaboration, digital readiness and targeted enterprise development programmes. A key milestone was the finalisation of the National Science, Technology and Innovation Policy: Catalysing National Development, which replaced the 1990 framework. Other major initiatives included the National Digital Transformation Strategy, open data expansion, and STEM education recommendations. The Coding in Schools Programme, piloted in 2021 and integrated into the national curriculum, equips students with foundational skills in logic, creativity and digital problem-solving. The Amber HEART Coding Academy, a 2021 public-private partnership with the Amber Group, offers year-long residential training in software development and industry internships. Alongside this, the STEM Ambassador Programme, run by the Scientific Research Council, connects students with mentors for career guidance and workshops to sustain interest in science and technology. Workforce development was also advanced through the Global Services Sector Project (2019–2024), which enhanced post-secondary training systems and supported the transition into high-value digital occupations. The Boosting Innovation, Growth and Entrepreneurship Ecosystem Programme, launched in 2020, funds start-ups, MSMEs and research commercialisation.

=== Intellectual Property Protection ===
Jamaica has one of the strongest intellectual property (IP) regimes in Latin America and the Caribbean, ranking fourth in the 2024 International Property Rights Index. The Patents and Designs Act 2020, effective February 2022, simplified patent and design applications — aligning with the Patent Cooperation Treaty and the Hague Agreement on Industrial Designs. Amendments to the Trade Marks Act in 2021 enabled Jamaica’s accession to the Madrid Protocol in March 2022, streamlining international trademark registration. Additionally, the Trade Marks (Amendment) Rules 2022, effective September 2023, expedited examination processes and revised fee structures.

=== Nuclear Science and Regulatory Institutions ===
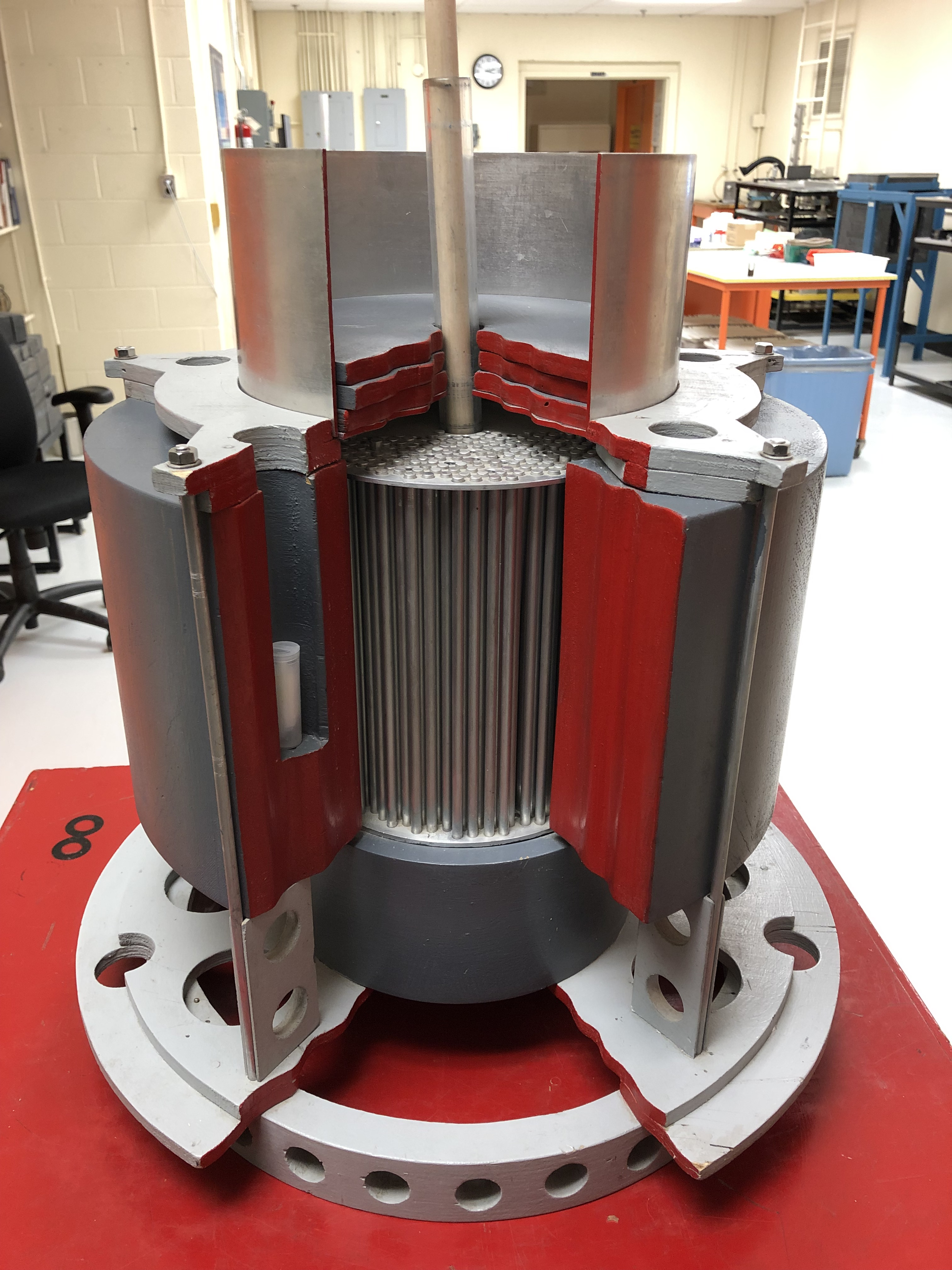
Model of the SLOWPOKE-2 reactor core. Jamaica is the only country in the Caribbean to operate a nuclear research reactor of this type.

Since the 1980s, Jamaica has successfully operated a 20 kW SLOWPOKE-2 nuclear reactor — the only such facility in the Caribbean. Managed by the International Centre for Environmental and Nuclear Sciences (ICENS) at the University of the West Indies, it supports neutron activation analysis for environmental monitoring, geochemical mapping, food studies, health research and agricultural trace-element analysis for land use and crop management. In 2015, over 30 years after commissioning, its core was converted to low-enriched uranium to enhance safety and non-proliferation.

In late 2020, Jamaica became the first CARICOM member state to establish an independent nuclear‐safety regulator — the Hazardous Substances Regulatory Authority (HSRA). Industry Minister Audley Shaw noted the move would allow Jamaica to “confidently forge ahead” in applying nuclear science to national development and wealth-creation strategies. Under the 2019 Nuclear Safety and Radiation Protection Regulations, HSRA oversees facilities utilising ionising radiation and nuclear technology, including the SLOWPOKE reactor. Supported by the International Atomic Energy Agency, Jamaica has strengthened its nuclear infrastructure — training technicians, certifying operators and upgrading facilities to meet international phytosanitary and export standards, while also expanding irradiation programmes into new fields such as agriculture and public health. This has positioned Jamaica as a regional leader in radiation safety, actively sharing expertise and best practices with other CARICOM member states.

Building on this foundation, in October 2024, Jamaica signed a memorandum of understanding with Atomic Energy of Canada Limited (AECL) and Canadian Nuclear Laboratories (CNL) to explore small modular reactors (SMRs) for cutting energy costs and reducing reliance on fossil fuels. While deployment remains a long-term goal, this initiative aligns with Vision 2030 objectives of advancing energy security, reducing greenhouse gas emissions, and promoting sustainable economic growth through advanced nuclear technology. Challenges include high upfront costs, complex licensing and the need for disaster‑resilient infrastructure in a hurricane‑prone region. Ongoing consultation with the HSRA and international partners aims to address these through phased research and capacity‑building.

=== Renewable Energy ===
While nuclear energy remains a long-term ambition, Jamaica is actively expanding renewable electricity through solar, wind and hydropower. Key projects include:

Wigton Windfarm (Manchester): The largest wind energy facility in the English-speaking Caribbean, with a capacity of 63 MW.

Paradise Park Solar Farm (Westmoreland): A 51 MWp solar installation generating over 80 GWh annually—one of the region’s largest.

Maggotty Hydropower Plant (St. Elizabeth): A 7.2 MW facility commissioned in 2014, contributing to Jamaica’s hydropower capacity.

Battery Storage Systems: A 171.5 MW project is planned to replace the Hunts Bay Power Plant by 2028, integrating 133 MW of solar and 43.02 kWh of lithium-based storage to enhance grid stability.

Policies supporting these efforts include the Electricity (Net Billing) Regulations, 2022, which enable households and businesses to sell excess solar power to the grid through contracts with the Jamaica Public Service Company. Net billing also provides credit for surplus electricity exported, encouraging broader adoption of distributed renewable energy. Additionally, the Integrated Resource Plan 2, approved in 2024, sets a target of 50 per cent renewable electricity by 2030 through solar, wind, hydro and storage.

=== Policy Impact ===
Jamaica’s policy framework is beginning to deliver tangible results, as seen in recent developments in science, technology, and innovation:

Software development is gaining momentum, supported by government policy and a growing local tech ecosystem. Initiatives such as Coding in Schools and Amber HEART Coding Academy have trained nearly 500 graduates by early 2024, with Amber aiming to train 20,000 by 2027 — advancing digital education and driving growth in the software sector.

Jamaica's global services industry is diversifying beyond traditional business process outsourcing (BPO), expanding into knowledge process outsourcing (KPO), IT support, healthcare, cybersecurity, finance, and data analytics. This shift aligns with the Global Digital Services Sector Project (2021–2025), which promotes higher-value service roles through training and digital infrastructure. International firms like BairesDev reported a 2,100 per cent increase in Jamaican hires from 2020 to 2022, reflecting the expansion of the country’s skilled digital workforce trained through national programmes. Platforms such as The Hive Careers further strengthen workforce development by providing industry-recognised certifications and matching professionals with opportunities across the tech industry.

Jamaica’s innovation ecosystem has seen measurable progress through the Boosting Innovation, Growth and Entrepreneurship Ecosystem (BIGEE) programme, launched in 2020. By early 2024, BIGEE had disbursed over US$9.9 million to 1,462 micro, small, and medium-sized enterprises (MSMEs) and supported 50 ecosystem institutions, leading to an average 25 per cent increase in sales and 15 per cent growth in employment among participating firms. These businesses also raised over J$100 million in additional funding, enhancing their financial capacity. The programme’s IGNITE component backed 82 early-stage ventures, which reported a 60 per cent average sales increase. BIGEE also launched a J$100 million Patent Grant Fund in October 2022, providing up to J$4 million per applicant to cover 80 per cent of costs for local and international filings. The first cycle supported four Jamaican inventors, whose innovations span agriculture, health, manufacturing, and clean energy, with patent applications filed in Jamaica, the United States, the United Kingdom, China, and the European Union.

Jamaica’s renewable energy sector continues to expand. By early 2024, 436 solar systems were licensed under the Electricity (Net Billing) Regulations, 2022, adding 8.5 MW of distributed capacity to the grid. Following Cabinet approval of the Integrated Resource Plan 2 (IRP-2) in November 2024, 99.83 MW of new solar capacity was competitively secured, with contracts awarded to Wigton Energy and Sunterra Energy Jamaica. By year-end, total installed renewable capacity reached 188 MW—representing 10–15 per cent of national electricity generation. Jamaica’s progress is reflected in its Bloomberg NEF Climatescope ranking, climbing eight spots to 39th globally and reaching 10th in Latin America and the Caribbean for renewable energy investment attractiveness.

Jamaica’s nuclear sector is evolving, demonstrated by its use of technology to support national development. Key policies, such as the 2019 Nuclear Safety and Radiation Protection Regulations, have been pivotal in establishing the regulatory framework that underpins these advancements. A notable example is the 2022 opening of a public nuclear medicine centre, established to reduce cancer diagnostic wait times through advanced imaging and treatment. Another outcome is the Mango Irradiation Programme, which reopened access to the U.S. market after a 20-year hiatus. Updated regulations enabled import compliance and programme participation. By mid-2025, the installation of a multi-purpose gamma irradiator at the International Centre for Environmental and Nuclear Sciences (ICENS) facilitated domestic irradiation for pest control, agricultural research, and medical sterilisation.

Together, these developments offer growing evidence that targeted policy efforts are driving digital and economic progress. If sustained, this trajectory could elevate Jamaica’s prominence in science, technology and innovation. While the country currently ranks 83rd out of 133 economies on the 2025 Global Innovation Index, continued momentum and investment may support gradual improvements in future assessments.

== Expenditure on research and development ==
=== Public Investment ===
In 2002, gross domestic expenditure on research and development (GERD) was just 0.06 per cent of GDP — far below the global average of 2.03 per cent at the time. By 2024, the UNESCO GO‑SPIN country profile estimated GERD at 0.07 per cent — still well under the global average of 2.01 per cent and the Latin America and Caribbean average of 0.6–0.7 per cent. Improved economic conditions enabled the first dedicated J$200 million grant for research and development (R&D) in the 2019–2020 Budget. In 2020, R&D was formally integrated into GDP calculations, a step Finance Minister Nigel Clarke deemed vital for research investment. Momentum continued with J$2 billion seed capital allocation for a micro, small and medium‑sized enterprise (MSME) equity fund (public‑private partnership) in the 2021–2022 Budget. By 2023/24, R&D allocations reached J$834.9 million, up six per cent, supporting the Scientific Research Council (SRC) in enhancing laboratories and testing capacity. For 2024/25, J$828.8 million was allocated to the SRC’s product research activities, supporting MSMEs, agricultural innovation, science education and technology transfer. Despite this progress, spending remains well below international benchmarks, with the government targeting 1.5 per cent of GDP by 2029.

=== Private Sector Participation and Incentives ===
Private-sector expenditure on R&D remains unevenly documented. A 2019 editorial in The Gleaner noted the absence of systematic data on firm-level investment. Available evidence suggests private firms contribute mainly to agriculture, agro‑processing, digital services, biotechnology and nutraceuticals. While these pockets of activity exist, indicators point to low private‑sector R&D intensity. Recent policies — including targeted fiscal incentives, innovation grants, BIGEE and broader investment reforms outlined in the National Investment Policy (2022) — aim to stimulate greater private-sector participation in applied research and product development.

== Institutions ==
A range of institutions support Jamaica’s scientific, technical, and professional research capacity:

- Hope Botanical Gardens (est. 1873) — Conducts research in plant conservation, acclimatization, and biodiversity to support Jamaica’s agriculture and ecological sustainability.
- Medical Association of Jamaica (est. 1877) — The oldest professional organization in Jamaica, it supports and disseminates research through its foundation, symposia, and institutional collaborations.
- Institute of Jamaica (est. 1879) — Supports scientific and cultural research through museum collections, academic publications, and the Jamaica Journal, positioning it as a hub for scholarly engagement.
- Jamaica Institution of Engineers (est. 1940s) — Facilitates engineering research through professional development, technical publications, and collaborative industry events.
- University of the West Indies (UWI), Mona (est. 1948) — A major regional institution, UWI Mona hosts faculties of medical and natural sciences, conducting research in cancer, climate change, ageing, and public health. With over JMD 495 million in research grants, it supports initiatives like Research Day, an annual event showcasing research, informing policy, and engaging students and the Caribbean community.
- Geological Society of Jamaica (est. 1955) — Supports Caribbean earth science through peer-reviewed research, professional development and cross-sector collaboration.
- University of Technology, Jamaica (originated as the Jamaica Institute of Technology in 1958) — Conducts applied research in engineering, computing, architecture, and health sciences. It addresses national priorities like climate resilience, energy systems, and public health, while hosting Jamaica’s first AI Lab. Its annual Research, Technology and Innovation Day showcases research in genomic medicine, sustainable water management, and agricultural biotechnology,.
- Scientific Research Council (est. 1960) — Based in Kingston, it coordinates national scientific research and fosters innovation in areas such as biotechnology and food science.
- Sugar Industry Research Institute (est. 1973) — Conducts research to enhance sugarcane production through improved varieties, pest and disease management, and sustainable practices. Collaborates with farmers and industry stakeholders, and offers training to boost productivity.
- Caribbean Agricultural Research and Development Institute (est. 1975) — Serves the wider Caribbean region in agricultural research and innovation.
- Caribbean Maritime University (est. 1980) — Specialises in research on maritime technologies, environmental sustainability, and logistics, contributing to the development and competitiveness of regional marine industries.
- International Centre for Environmental and Nuclear Sciences (est. 1984) — Based at UWI Mona, ICENS operates the SLOWPOKE-2 research reactor and conducts multidisciplinary research in environmental geochemistry, climate change, and marine ecosystems. It supports neutron activation analysis for health, agriculture, and environmental studies, while advancing education and training in applied nuclear science.
- National Commission on Science and Technology (NCST) (est. 1993) — Guides national research and innovation policy to leverage Jamaica’s scientific resources for development.
- Caribbean Institute for Health Research (est. 1999) — Formerly the Tropical Medicine Research Institute, this UWI Mona-based institute conducts multidisciplinary research on child development, nutrition, chronic diseases, and sickle cell disease. Its four units, including the Tropical Metabolism and Sickle Cell Units, focus on translating research into policy and practice. Programs like Reach Up have been adopted globally, shaping Caribbean health policies, school feeding, and chronic disease prevention.
- University of the Commonwealth Caribbean (est. 2004) — Hosts annual research conferences and doctoral programs focused on applied innovation and workforce development.
- Caribbean Public Health Agency (CARPHA) (est. 2013) — Conducts and promotes research across priority health areas—such as communicable diseases, noncommunicable diseases, mental health, and environmental health—to strengthen Caribbean public health systems and inform policy. It was formed by merging five regional health bodies, including the Caribbean Food and Nutrition Institute, and maintains a national office in Kingston, Jamaica.

== Science output & publications ==
Jamaica’s scientific research output has grown steadily over the past decade, with notable activity in health sciences. According to the UNESCO Science Report 2021, publication volume rose by 26 per cent from 265 articles in 2011 to 335 in 2019. Between 2014 and 2016, Jamaica ranked fourth within CARICOM for average of relative citations, achieving a score of 1.36 – surpassing the G20 average of 1.02. From 2017 to 2019, Jamaican researchers contributed over 20 per cent of CARICOM’s published health‑science articles, highlighting the country’s regional prominence in this field. During the same period, Jamaican scholars co-authored 379 publications with the United States, 118 with the United Kingdom, 95 with Canada, 52 with France and 51 with Mexico, focusing on public health, agriculture, and environmental sustainability. In 2018, Jamaica had 282 researchers per million inhabitants, primarily in higher education, and in 2019, produced 114 publications per million inhabitants across all disciplines. The UNESCO GO-SPIN 2024 country profile reports that Jamaican authors published 358 Scopus-indexed articles in 2023, ranking second within CARICOM. Approximately 90 per cent of national output originated from the University of the West Indies (UWI), underscoring its institutional dominance in regional science. Between 1 May 2024 and 30 April 2025, the Nature Index recorded a total research output of 21 articles (Share 2.93) for the University of the West Indies. Subject-area totals included biological sciences (Count 8, Share 0.23), earth and environmental sciences (Count 8, Share 1.49), health sciences (Count 9, Share 0.85) and physical sciences (Count 2, Share 0.66). During that period, UWI ranked first internationally among academic institutions by Share in both biological sciences and earth and environmental sciences. It also ranked first internationally among academic institutions overall, and second internationally across all sectors, based on the proportion of its research published outside its home country.

Jamaica’s research landscape includes a number of institutions contributing across diverse fields. The Alper–Doğer (AD) Scientific Index globally ranks 2,626,677 scientists from 24,577 universities and institutions across 222 countries. Within this framework, it lists 13 Jamaican universities and research institutions, comprising a total of 570 ranked scientists. The University of the West Indies (UWI) has the highest number of ranked scientists among Jamaican institutions. Of UWI’s listed researchers, 17 are in the top 10 per cent globally (including one in the top three per cent), 52 are in the top 20 per cent, with 91 in the top 30 per cent. These researchers are active in areas such as medical and health sciences, engineering, and environmental studies. Other institutions listed include the University of Technology, Jamaica (UTech), which has published work in engineering and applied sciences, and has one scientist ranked in the top 30 per cent globally. Jamaica’s 2025 ranking in the AD Index places it 14th in Latin America and the Caribbean, higher than any other CARICOM member state. While the UNESCO Science Report 2021 highlights a moderate per capita publication rate (114 publications per million inhabitants in 2019 – ranking ninth among CARICOM countries), the AD Index assesses research quality and productivity through citation-based metrics – highlighting a Jamaican research landscape defined less by per capita volume and more by depth, influence and international visibility. The Scientific Research Council (SRC) plays a complementary role in science output, completing 13,918 analyses across sectors like food, water and environment in 2023–2024, and developing 49 unique products through its Food Product Development Unit.

Among Jamaica’s most notable scholarly publications is the Jamaica Journal, a peer‑reviewed periodical issued by the Institute of Jamaica since 1967. It publishes work in history, natural sciences, literature and the arts, and attracts an international readership that includes the Jamaican diaspora in North America and Europe. Complementing this is the Jamaican Journal of Science and Technology, published by the Scientific Research Council since 1990 (building on earlier SRC journals from the 1960s), which focuses on applied research in environmental science, engineering, innovation and technology transfer. Another longstanding publication is the West Indian Medical Journal, produced by the University of the West Indies, Mona, since 1951 (originally the Jamaica Medical Review), which publishes clinical and biomedical research relevant to the Caribbean and frequently features work by Jamaican authors.

== Science activities ==
Notable activities aimed at promoting science and innovation include:

Science Resource Centre & Innovation Laboratory: Opened in 2018, this facility supports the development of revenue-generating clean technology enterprises across the region. It is the first of its kind in the Caribbean.

Public Wi-Fi Hotspot Programme: As of 2025, more than 380 public Wi-Fi hotspots have been established across Jamaica, providing free internet access and supporting digital inclusion initiatives.

Science and Technology Fairs: These events offer students and researchers a platform to showcase innovations and engage the public in scientific exploration and learning.

Innovation and Invention Competitions: Jamaica encourages grassroots innovation through national competitions that promote creativity, problem-solving, and entrepreneurship. These include the National Innovation Competition, organized by the National Commission on Science and Technology, as well as youth-focused invention challenges supported by public agencies and private sector partners. Such initiatives aim to identify promising ideas, support commercialization, and foster a culture of innovation aligned with national development goals.

== Recognition and awards ==
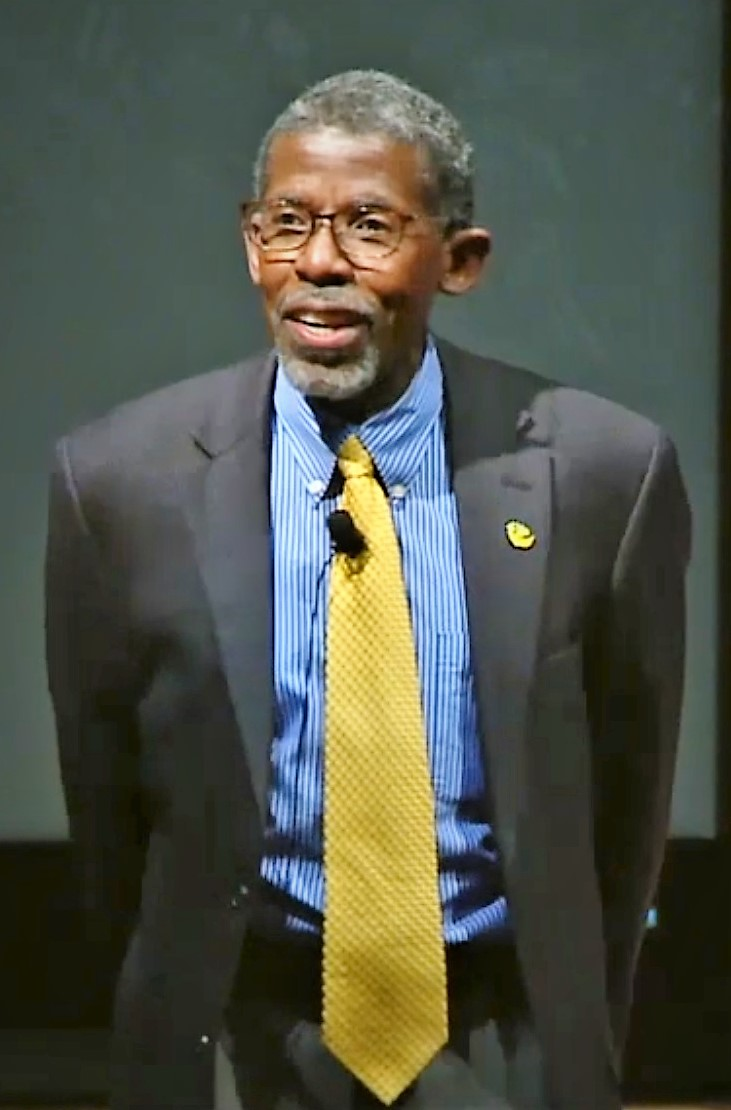
Evan Dale Abel. He established the critical link between adipose tissue glucose transporter (GLUT4) and whole-body insulin resistance.

See also: List of Jamaicans - Science and medicine

The following is a selection of scientists of Jamaican heritage who have received international awards and distinctions for their contributions to science, technology, and innovation:

- Evan Dale Abel – Awarded the Fred Conrad Koch Lifetime Achievement Award (2024), the highest honour of the Endocrine Society, for pioneering research on diabetes and cardiovascular disease.
- Simone Badal-McCreath – Received the Elsevier Foundation Award for Early Career Women Scientists in the Developing World for her groundbreaking cancer research.
- Walt W. Braithwaite – Honoured with the Black Engineer of the Year Award for leadership in aerospace engineering and digital innovation at Boeing. The Walt W. Braithwaite Legacy Award, established in his name, continues to recognize excellence in engineering leadership.
- Anthony Chen – Contributing member of the Intergovernmental Panel on Climate Change (IPCC), jointly awarded the Nobel Peace Prize (2007) for advancing global awareness of climate change; recognized for his leadership in Caribbean climate science and founding the Climate Studies Group Mona at the University of the West Indies.
- Patricia DeLeon – Received the U.S. Presidential Award for Excellence in Science, Mathematics, and Engineering Mentoring, the top U.S. award for scientific mentorship.
- Bertram Fraser-Reid – Reportedly nominated for the Nobel Prize in Chemistry (1998) for his research on oligosaccharides and immune response.
- Thomas Lecky – Appointed an Officer of the Order of the British Empire (OBE) for his development of the Jamaica Hope breed and transformative work in tropical agriculture.
- Henry Lowe – Honoured by the U.S. House of Representatives with a formal proclamation for contributions to science, innovation, and public service.
- Judith Mendes and Arnoldo Ventura – Honoured with the prestigious International Network for Government Science Advice (INGSA) 2020 awards, making Jamaica the first country to win in both categories in a single year.
- Geoff Palmer – Knighted by Queen Elizabeth II for services to science, human rights, and charity, and later inducted into the Order of the Thistle, Scotland’s highest civilian honour. He also became only the fourth person ever to receive the American Society of Brewing Chemists Award of Distinction, often referred to as the “Nobel Prize of brewing,” for his invention of the barley abrasion process that revolutionized the industry.
- Mercedes Richards – Awarded the Fulbright Distinguished Chair in Research (2010–2011), one of the most prestigious posts in the Fulbright Program, for her work on binary stars. The Professor Mercedes T. Richards Award, established in her name, honours excellence in undergraduate astronomy research.
- Manley West – Received the Certificate of Merit from the Government of Canada for co-developing Canasol, one of the world’s first cannabis-derived glaucoma medication.
- Cicely Williams – Awarded the James Spence Medal (UK) for discovering kwashiorkor, and became the first woman Honorary Fellow of the Royal College of Medicine. She also received the Ceres Medal from the World Health Organization for her contributions to maternal and child health.

== Contributions ==
Those of Jamaican heritage have made numerous contributions across diverse fields of science and technology—including medicine, computing, climate science, chemistry astronomy, and astrophysics. Notable examples include:

=== Medicine and Health ===
The discovery of Kwashiorkor – Cicely Williams identified and named Kwashiorkor, a severe form of protein-energy malnutrition, and developed a treatment plan that saved countless lives. Her pioneering work corrected widespread misdiagnoses and helped reshape global understanding of pediatric malnutrition. She also fundamentally changed the global approach to the care of mothers and children—shifting it from centralized institutions to community-based support led by auxiliaries and lay health workers. This model laid the groundwork for maternal and child health to become a formal discipline, now taught worldwide—from training colleges to leading universities.

Skeletal structure of cilazapril, an antihypertensive drug featuring a piperazic acid-like motif—first identified in Monamycin, a natural product discovered in Jamaica.

The discovery of Monamycin – Jamaican chemist Kenneth Magnus discovered and co-synthesised the antibiotic Monamycin from Streptomyces jamaicensis, a bacterium found in Jamaican soil. Monamycin’s structural analysis led to the discovery of piperazic acids—rare amino acids that became key building blocks in the development of cilazapril, an angiotensin-converting enzyme inhibitor (ACE inhibitor). Cilazapril was widely used to help patients manage high blood pressure and reduce cardiovascular risk. The piperazic acid framework has since influenced a range of medicines, including anti-inflammatory, antitumor, and immunosuppressant agents, underscoring its importance in modern medicinal chemistry.

The development of ACRJ-PC28 – Simone Badal McCreath created the first Caribbean-derived prostate cancer cell line, addressing a critical gap by providing a model that better represents African-Caribbean genetics, historically underrepresented in cancer research. This breakthrough enables more accurate testing of cancer treatments for Black populations and marks a pivotal step toward equitable oncology research.

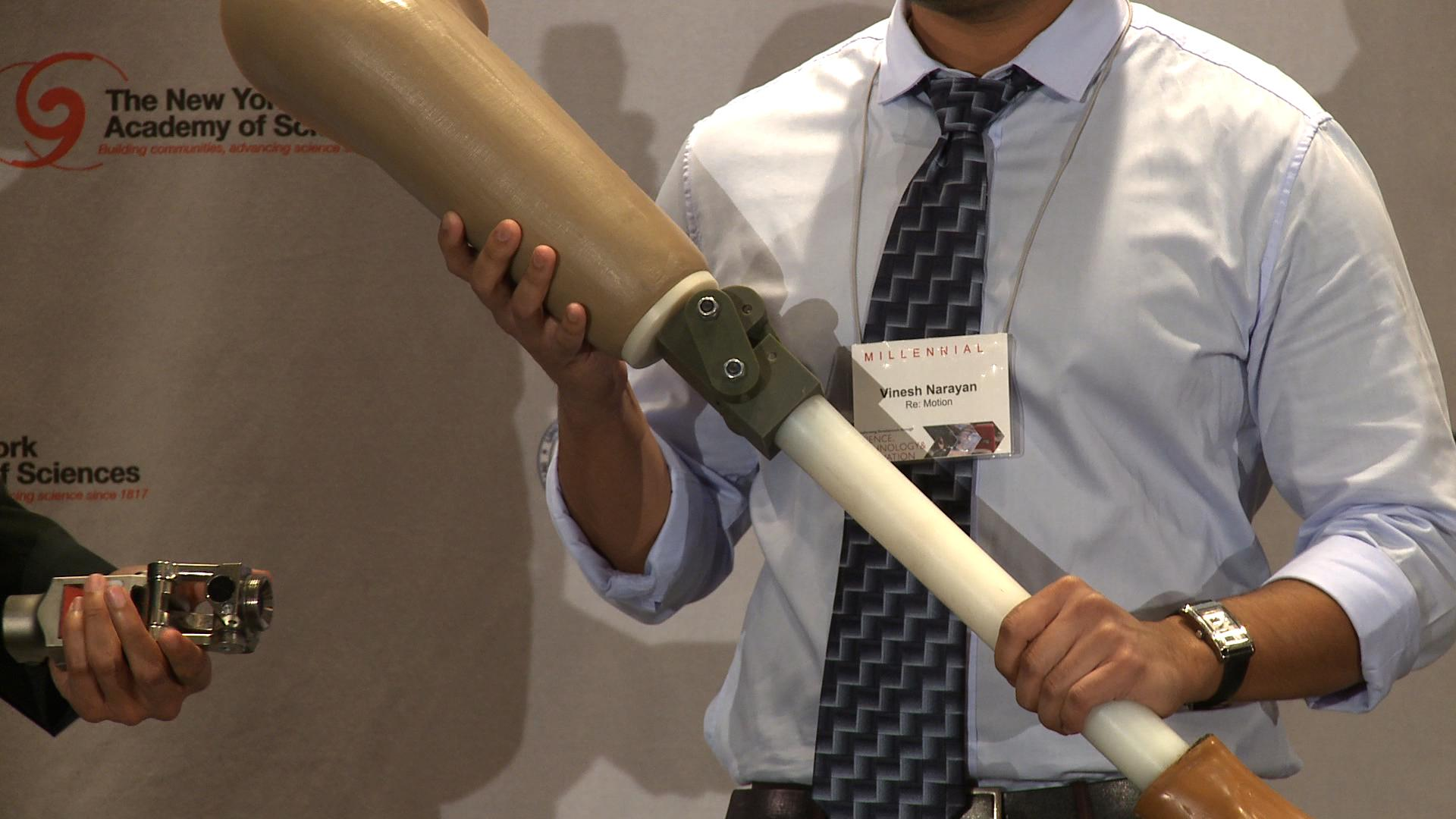
The Jaipur Knee

The development of the Jaipur Knee – Jamaican-born engineer Joel Sadler was the primary inventor and project lead behind the Jaipur Knee, a groundbreaking prosthetic joint designed to restore mobility to above-knee amputees in low-resource settings. Developed during his graduate studies at Stanford University, the device uses a polycentric, four-bar linkage system made from oil-filled nylon—delivering durability, flexibility, and stability at a cost of around US$20. Created in partnership with the Jaipur Foot Organization in India, the Jaipur Knee was named one of Time magazine’s best inventions of 2009. It has since been distributed across many countries including India, the Philippines, and Vietnam, enabling thousands of individuals to achieve greater mobility and independence.

Pioneering Sickle Cell Treatments – Yvette Francis-McBarnette was the first to use prophylactic antibiotics in the treatment of children with sickle cell anemia, dramatically improving survival rates. Her clinic screened more than 20,000 schoolchildren, enabling early detection and lifelong management that significantly improved quality of life. Her early intervention model—screening children and placing them on continuous treatment—created a paradigm shift in how the disease was managed in the United States. Her influence extended to national policy through her role in shaping the 1972 National Sickle Cell Anemia Control Act, which institutionalized many of the practices she had already proven effective. Over time, her approach helped inform global best practices in sickle cell care, particularly in regions with high disease prevalence. In a separate but equally significant development, Jamaica established the only comprehensive sickle cell unit in the English-speaking Caribbean and has played a pioneering role in global sickle cell research and care. Based at the University of the West Indies, the Sickle Cell Unit led one of the world’s most influential cohort studies, shaping international understanding of the disease’s natural history. It was also among the first globally to introduce newborn screening in a low-resource setting and developed a day-care model for managing acute pain crises—now recognized as a best practice. The unit’s research has informed WHO and UN policies, while its training programmes have helped expand care across the Caribbean.

Pioneering work on diabetes mellitus – Errol Morrison was widely recognized as one of the first to characterize and elaborate on phasic (J-type) diabetes, a malnutrition-related form of diabetes mellitus first identified by Philip Hugh-Jones in Jamaica in 1955. Morrison’s research detailed its intermittent insulin dependence in young, lean individuals and linked it to pancreatic damage from chronic malnutrition or dietary toxins like cyanogenic glycosides in cassava, with evidence of impaired glucagon secretion. His work supported its recognition as part of malnutrition-related diabetes mellitus (MRDM) by the World Health Organization and its reclassification as Type 5 diabetes by the International Diabetes Federation in 2025, reflecting its distinct pathology. Morrison also established the Diabetes Association of Jamaica, a comprehensive care facility offering laser therapy, kidney dialysis, foot care, and pharmaceutical services. He also researched medicinal plants for their potential in diabetes management in the Caribbean.

The development of the ‘Goffe’ strain – Alan Powell Goffe created this attenuated measles strain, also known as the ‘Beckenham’ strain, which became the foundation for numerous measles vaccines used worldwide. Goffe also played a key role in refining early polio vaccines, improving their safety for use in Britain and beyond. His scientific contributions were instrumental in advancing vaccines that protected millions from the devastating effects of polio and childhood measles. He was also among the first to conduct large-scale studies of human papillomavirus (HPV), laying critical foundations for its later recognition as a cause of cervical cancer.

The invention of the Ramphal Cardiac Surgery Simulator (RCSS) – Developed in 2001 by Jamaican-born Paul S. Ramphal at the University of the West Indies, alongside Professor Daniel N. Coore and Dr. Michael P. Craven, the Ramphal Cardiac Surgery Simulator (RCSS) is a high-fidelity training device that uses a reanimated pig heart to replicate human cardiovascular procedures like bypass grafting. Unlike earlier simulators and pig heart models, the RCSS features a realistic, beating heart housed within an artificial human chest cavity, with synthetic blood flowing through its vessels — creating the illusion of a living organ in surgery. Its affordable and ethical design enables trainees to experience true-to-life cardiac physiology, including arrhythmias, cardiac arrest, and dynamic blood pressure changes — all without the use of live animals or human subjects. As noted in the European Journal of Cardio-Thoracic Surgery, the simulator “can also be used to demonstrate the function of technology specific to cardiac surgical procedures in a way that previously has only been possible via the conduct of a procedure on a live animal or human being” — a capability that sets it apart from conventional models. Praised in 2018 as “perhaps the most exciting” beating-heart model, the RCSS was recognised for its innovation with a U.S. patent. Commercialised for clinical education, the RCSS has been adopted by several leading hospitals and institutions across the United States, including Johns Hopkins Hospital, Mayo Clinic and the University of Washington in Seattle. Since 2008, the University of North Carolina at Chapel Hill has incorporated the RCSS into its Thoracic Surgery Directors Association (TSDA) Boot Camp, training numerous surgical residents in complex cardiac procedures. Other U.S. adopters include the University of Rochester Medical Centre. Internationally, the Royal College of Surgeons in Ireland integrated the simulator into its curriculum in 2023.

=== Computing ===
The invention of Lingo – John Henry Thompson, a Jamaican-born computer scientist, invented Lingo, a high-level scripting language for Adobe Director, in the late 1980s. Lingo enabled artists and developers to create animations, games, and interactive multimedia without extensive programming knowledge. It powered interactive CD-ROMs, educational software, and early web content via Shockwave. Thompson’s innovation bridged coding and creativity, democratizing multimedia development and influencing modern gaming, web design, and interactive experience.

CAD/CAM advancements and IGES common data format – Walt W. Braithwaite provided the technical vision and leadership behind Boeing’s CAD/CAM data exchange format — directing its development and guiding the team with his expertise. As lead engineer for CAD/CAM integration, he implemented the Computer Integrated Information Network (CIIN), enabling fully digital aircraft design and significantly reducing development time and cost. His development of Boeing’s internal format and translation systems would ultimately serve as the groundwork for the Initial Graphics Exchange Specification (IGES), a landmark standard that allowed CAD systems across industries to communicate and collaborate seamlessly. In recognition of his contributions, Braithwaite received the IGES/PDES Award in 1990 for leadership and outstanding technical achievement.

=== Chemistry ===
Armed–disarmed principle – Bertram Fraser-Reid, a Jamaican-born chemist, developed the armed–disarmed principle in the 1980s, advancing carbohydrate chemistry by enabling selective glycosylation for efficient oligosaccharide synthesis. This concept, distinguishing “armed” and “disarmed” glycosyl donors, facilitates the construction of complex sugars critical for vaccine development, including malaria and tuberculosis research. Fraser-Reid’s team also pioneered the manual synthesis of large, structurally complex oligosaccharides. This principle underpins modern glycosylation strategies, shaping pharmaceutical development and glycobiology research.

Metallocene catalysis – John Alexander Ewen, a Jamaican-born chemist, developed a class of metallocene catalysts that revolutionized the production of polyolefins like polyethylene and polypropylene. These catalysts enabled precise control over plastic properties, yielding stronger, heat-resistant, tear-proof, and transparent materials for industries including packaging, automotive, medical devices, and consumer goods. Ewen also formulated the Ewen Symmetry Rules, a foundational guide for catalyst design in polymer chemistry. His innovations spurred hundreds of patents and transformed the global plastics industry, earning him the National Medal of Technology, the highest U.S. honor in the field.

=== Astronomy and Astrophysics ===
Pioneer of spectroscopic tomography in astronomy – Mercedes Richards, a Jamaican-born astronomer, was the first to adapt medical imaging techniques for astronomical use through spectroscopic tomography. This innovative method visualizes gas flows in interacting binary star systems, advancing research on Algol binaries and magnetic fields in stellar interactions. Her work deepened understanding of how Sun-like stars influence binary system evolution.

=== Food Science ===
Invention of the Barley Abrasion Process – Sir Geoff Palmer, a Jamaican-born scientist, made transformative contributions to brewing science and cereal technology. His groundbreaking discovery—that enzymes critical to malting originate in the bran, not the germ—overturned decades of scientific consensus and reshaped global malt production for beer and spirits. Palmer invented the barley abrasion process, an industrial technique that enhances malting efficiency by mechanically scuffing barley grains to stimulate enzyme activity. Widely adopted in the British brewing industry, this method has saved millions of pounds annually through faster production and higher extract yields. Palmer was also the first to use scanning electron microscopy to study malt production, revealing new insights into grain microstructure. His innovations continue to influence commercial brewing and food science globally.

=== Climate Science and Environmental Research ===
Jamaica has made significant contributions to climate science. As a small island developing state, it faces serious climate change impacts—including tropical cyclones, sea-level rise, and coastal erosion. Yet, despite these challenges, Jamaica has emerged as a regional leader in climate research, advocacy, and innovation—championing sustainable development and climate resilience across the Caribbean. Central to these efforts is the Climate Studies Group, Mona (CSGM), founded in 1994 by Nobel Peace Prize laureate Professor Anthony Chen. The group has produced over 200 peer-reviewed publications, trained more than 30 graduate students, shaping regional expertise in climate modeling and resilience planning. Among its key innovations are solar and wind energy mapping, statistical models for seasonal rainfall forecasting, and the Caribbean Climate Interactive Database—developments that laid the groundwork for practical tools such as dengue outbreak early warning systems, customized seasonal forecasting models, and the State of the Caribbean Climate Report 2020, a resource widely used by Caribbean policymakers to guide climate adaptation and resilience strategies. CSGM researchers have played key roles in multiple Intergovernmental Panel on Climate Change (IPCC) reports, including Climate Change 2007: The Physical Science Basis and the Special Report on Global Warming of 1.5°C. Their work has informed national and regional policies on disaster preparedness, agriculture, public health, and renewable energy. Through international collaborations and significant research funding, CSGM has positioned Jamaica as a key contributor to global climate science.

Among Jamaica’s most influential contributors to climate science is Thomas J. Goreau, a Jamaican-born biogeochemist and marine biologist whose work has impacted coral reef restoration, climate monitoring, and ecosystem regeneration. Highlights of Goreau’s work include:

Co-discovery and co-development of Biorock technology — In 1976, architect Wolf Hilbertz invented a mineral accretion process using low-voltage currents to build underwater structures. In 1987, Thomas Goreau invited Hilbertz to Jamaica, where they co-discovered its ability to boost coral growth and resilience. They co-developed and patented Biorock, a technology for reef restoration and coastal protection. Biorock corals grow 3–5 times faster and survive bleaching better than natural corals. Deployed in over 40 countries, with notable successes in Bali and Gili Trawangan, it has restored reefs, prevented beach erosion, and boosted eco-tourism and local economies.

Co-invention of the Goreau-Hayes Hotspot Method — First introduced in the early 1990s, this approach analyzes satellite-derived sea surface temperature (SST) data to spot thermal anomalies over 1 °C above the average peak month, highlighting potential coral bleaching events. This technique formed the scientific foundation for NOAA’s Coral Reef Watch program, which adopted it in 1997 to launch its Coral Bleaching HotSpot product—enabling global monitoring and forecasting of bleaching events. The Goreau-Hayes method remains a vital tool for researchers worldwide, underpinning studies and operational systems for assessing thermal stress on coral reefs, with ongoing research refining its thresholds for greater regional accuracy.

Development of soil carbon stabilization techniques — Goreau’s research into soil metabolism and remineralization has led to strategies for enhancing carbon sequestration in degraded soils. He promotes this as a key tool in reversing climate change and restoring agricultural productivity.

=== Space Exploration ===
Robert Rashford is a Jamaican-born aerospace engineer recognised for his innovations in spacecraft design, mission safety, and nondestructive testing technologies — many of which were developed through Genesis Engineering Solutions, the company he founded in 1993. He has played a significant role in systems flown aboard NASA’s human spaceflight programs, including the Hubble Space Telescope servicing missions, International Space Station payloads and the James Webb Space Telescope. His work has enhanced the reliability, efficiency and safety of space systems across multiple missions and platforms. Key highlights of Rashford’s work include:

Co-inventing the world’s first portable 3D nondestructive evaluation (NDE) system, used for maintenance on the Hubble Space Telescope. This system detects internal flaws in spacecraft materials without disassembly, improving mission reliability.

Developing a single‑person spacecraft for Orbital Reef — a compact, pressurised pod for solo orbital operations, incorporating a crew cabin, external equipment bay, and integrated sensors. Designed at Genesis Engineering Solutions, it supports satellite servicing, object handling, and space tourism. Its pressurised environment allows non‑astronaut operators to work comfortably, while reducing risks such as decompression sickness and suit leaks, thereby enhancing commercial spaceflight safety.

Designing protective enclosures for orbital replacement units (ORUs) to safeguard critical Hubble components during servicing missions in 1993, 1997, 1999 and 2002. Constructed from honeycombed aluminium sheets and connectors, these lightweight enclosures reduced spacecraft mass while protecting high‑value hardware.

Engineering leadership in major aerospace projects — Rashford designed advanced systems for the Upper Atmosphere Research Satellite (UARS) while at Orbital Sciences Corporation, contributed to commercial and military spacecraft programs at General Electric, and worked on nuclear reactor infrastructure projects at Bechtel Corporation.

Another notable figure is Christopher Huie, an aerospace engineer, astronaut, and speaker. In 2023, Huie became the first person of Jamaican heritage to travel to space, serving as a Mission Specialist aboard Virgin Galactic’s Unity 25. As a senior manager, he has contributed to the design, development, and operation of air-launched spaceflight systems. Beyond his technical work, Huie advocates for equity in STEM and frequently speaks at educational and nonprofit events. He also co-founded the Black Leaders in Aerospace Scholarship and Training (BLAST) Program, which mentors students from underrepresented backgrounds to pursue aerospace careers—supporting diversity and inclusion in the aerospace industry.
