= Hoveyda (surname) =

Hoveyda is a surname. Notable people with the surname include:

- Amir-Abbas Hoveyda (1920–1979), Prime Minister of Iran
- Amir H. Hoveyda (fl. from 1986), American chemist
- Fereydoon Hoveyda (1924–2006), Iranian diplomat and writer
