= Jeannette Garcia =

American chemist

Jeannette M. Garcia
- Born: Seattle, Washington
- Education: Seattle University; Boston College
- Known for: recyclable thermoset polymers
- Scientific career
- Fields: Chemistry, Quantum Chemistry
- Workplaces: IBM
- Doctoral advisor: Amir H. Hoveyda

Jeannette Garcia is a chemist and quantum executive at IBM known for her discovery of a new class of polymers.

== Early life and education ==
Garcia was born and raised in Seattle, Washington. She received her BSc in Biochemistry while studying at Seattle University in 2006. She later graduated with her PhD in chemistry from Boston College in 2012.

== Career ==
After graduating from her PhD program, Garcia began her career as a post-doctoral researcher at IBM Research in 2012. While a postdoctoral researcher, she worked with fellow colleagues and worked on high performance and recyclable materials.

Garcia became an IBM Research Staff Member in 2013 for IBM Research Almaden. Between 2017-2018, Garcia served as the Technical Advisor to Dr. Sophie Vandebroek, then the COO of IBM Research.

In 2018, Garcia became a manager and the Global Lead for Quantum Applications in Quantum Chemistry and Science. While serving as a researcher for Quantum Chemistry, she made a significant discovery. While working in the lab, Garcia accidentally left a solution sitting in a test tube which solidified. Her curiosity led her to examine the solid mass, and she realized she had discovered a new class of polymer that is tough, light, and recyclable. This discovery addressed a long-standing challenge in making thermoset plastics recyclable. Garcia's innovation earned her a spot on the prestigious MIT Technology Review’s 35 Innovators under 35 list. Her invention has the potential to be utilized in various applications, including phones, airplanes, and buildings. In 2016, Garcia and fellow IBM researcher Gavin Jones developed an innovative process for chemically recycling plastics while preventing the industrial chemical BPA from leaching. Garcia and Jones were both named among Foreign Policy magazine's Leading Global Thinkers for their pioneering work.
