= Irish moss (drink) =

Jamaican beverage

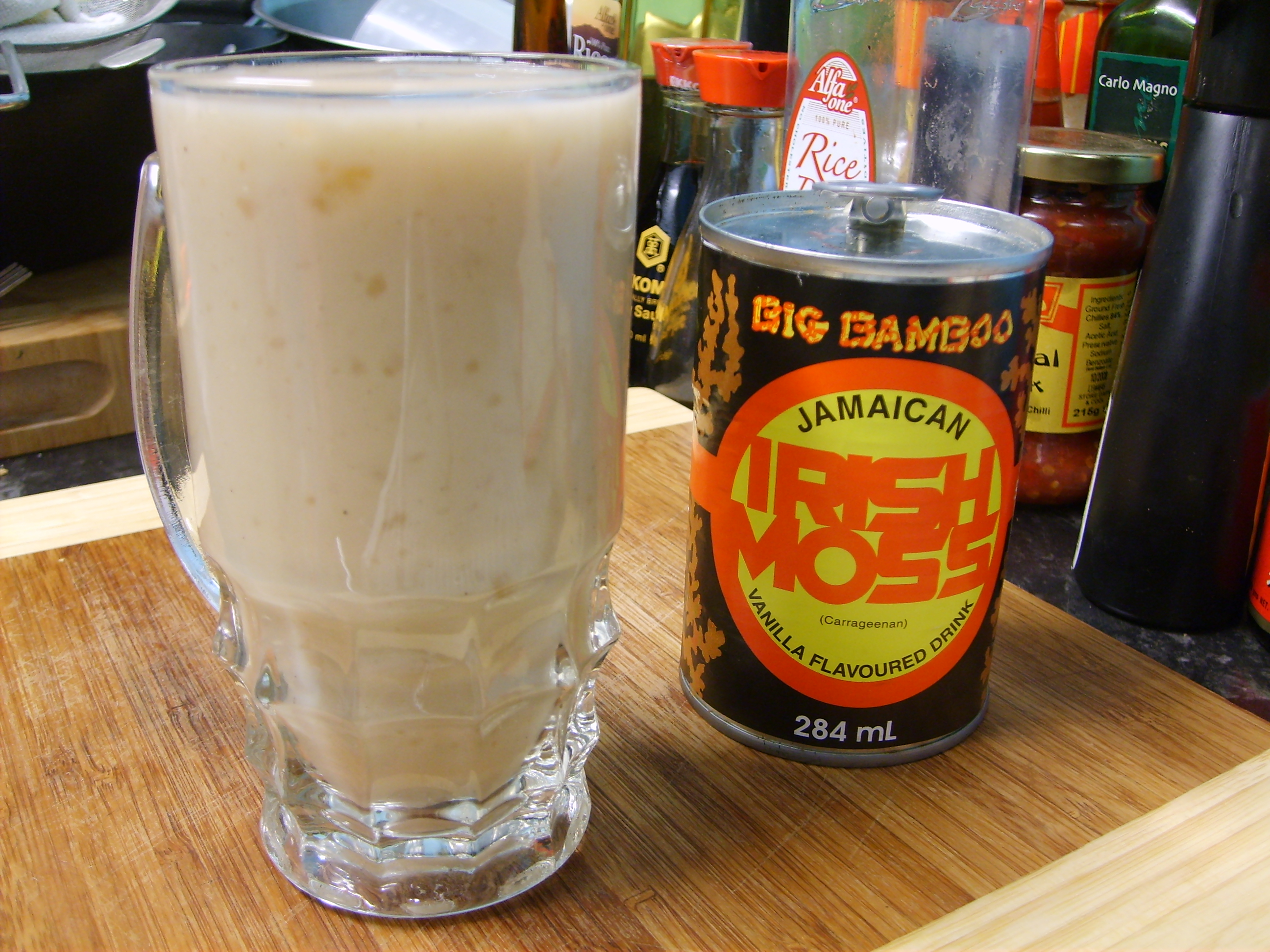
Jamaican Irish Moss drink - in can and over ice

Irish moss (or sea moss) is a Caribbean beverage (mainly available in Jamaica and Trinidad and Tobago) in which the main ingredient is the marine red algae Gracilaria spp. (itself one of several commonly referred by the name of "Irish moss", purportedly introduced to the island's coast by Irish indentured servants), boiled in milk with sugar or honey and various spices added such as vanilla, cinnamon, and nutmeg. Depending on the recipe, other ingredients may include sweetened condensed milk and additional thickening agents such as gum arabic or isinglass (fish gelatin), as well as ingredients like rolled oats or linseed oil to add extra fat content. A peanut-flavored version is also widely available, which is based upon another drink popular in the Caribbean, peanut punch.

Carrageenan in the cell walls of the seaweed gives the drink a distinctive thick consistency and rich mouthfeel. The Irish moss drink has traditionally been homemade and sold at roadside "punch man" stalls alongside peanut punch and other refreshing drinks, but mass-produced commercial canned versions are now common as well. Irish moss has various health properties and is high in calories and rich in protein, making it a favorite among athletes and bodybuilders. It is reputed to cure digestive problems like ulcers and a tonic for mood disorders. The drink is widely marketed as an aphrodisiac for men. It is often available at bars in Jamaica as a mixer for rum, whiskey or even Guinness stout.

== See also ==
- Protein shake
- Peanut punch (drink)
- Jamaican cuisine
