= Bertram Fraser-Reid =

Jamaican chemist (1934–2020)

- Born: Bertram Oliver Fraser-Reid; 23 February 1934; Coleyville, Jamaica
- Died: 25 May 2020 (aged 86)
- Citizenship: Canada and Jamaica
- Education: Queen's University, University of Alberta
- Known for: Chiral syntheses using carbohydrates, role of oligosaccharides in immune response, “armed-disarmed” principle.
- Awards: Merck, Sharp & Dohme Award, Chemical Institute of Canada (1977); Senior Distinguished US Scientist, Alexander von Humboldt Foundation (1989); Claude S. Hudson Award in Carbohydrate Chemistry, American Chemical Society (1990); Jamaican National Foundation Award (1990); Percy Julian Award, National Organization for the Professional Advancement of Black Chemists and Chemical Engineers (1991); Haworth Memorial Medal and Lectureship, Royal Society of Chemistry (1995); Gold Musgrave Medal, Institute of Jamaica (2007)
- Scientific career
- Fields: Organic chemistry
- Workplaces: University of Waterloo, University of Maryland, Duke University
- Doctoral advisor: Raymond Lemieux

Bertram Oliver "Bert" Fraser-Reid (23 February 1934 – 25 May 2020) was a Jamaican synthetic organic chemist who has been widely recognised for his work using carbohydrates as starting materials for chiral materials and on the role of oligosaccharides in immune response. He developed the “armed-disarmed” principle.

== Early life ==
Fraser-Reid was born in Coleyville, Jamaica to William, an elementary school principal, and Laura, a teacher. He had five older siblings. Laura died when Fraser-Reid was only nine months old. He attended Excelsior High School and Clarendon College before moving to Canada to earn BSc (1959) and MSc (1961) at Queen's University in Ontario He went to University of Alberta to earn a PhD in 1964 under the supervision of Raymond Lemieux. He went to Imperial College London to do postdoctoral work for Nobel Laureate Sir Derek Barton from 1964 to 1966.

== Academic career ==
From 1966 to 1980 Fraser-Reid was on the faculty of the University of Waterloo in Waterloo, Ontario where he established a research group known as "Fraser-Reid's Rowdies". The primary emphasis of his work at this point was the synthesis of chiral natural products using carbohydrates as the starting materials. In 1975, Fraser-Reid was the first to publish a method for making nonsugar compounds with simple sugars. In 1980, he was hired at the University of Maryland, College Park, and then at Duke University in North Carolina in 1983. In 1985 he was appointed the James B. Duke Professor of Chemistry. At Duke University, his research shifted to exploring the role of oligosaccharides in immune responses, and particularly on the effect of molecules on human diseases like malaria and AIDS. After retiring from Duke in 1996, due to an undisclosed harassment claim, he established the Natural Products & Glycotechnology Research Institute, a nonprofit, to study the carbohydrate chemistry/biology of tropical parasitic diseases in developing countries and to develop a carbohydrate-based malaria vaccine. Fraser-Reid and his team achieved a milestone in oligosaccharide synthesis by assembling a molecule consisting of 28 monosaccharide units.

== Achievements ==
Several sources have reported that Fraser-Reid was nominated in 1998 for a Nobel Prize in chemistry for his work on oligosaccharides and immune responses. This statement cannot be verified since the names of the nominees are never publicly announced, and neither are they told that they have been considered for the Prize. Nomination records are sealed for fifty years.

The Institute of Jamaica awarded Fraser-Reid the 2007 Musgrave Medal (Gold) for his work in chemistry, noting that during his career he co-authored over 330 peer-reviewed publications and supervised 85 post-doctoral fellows and 55 PhD students.

== Other interests ==
Along with his interest in science, Fraser-Reid was a pianist and organist who gave recitals at venues such as St. George's Cathedral, Kingston, Jamaica (December 1986) and Cathedral de Seville, Spain (August 1995).

In the 1970s Fraser-Reid filed a lawsuit against a building contractor who had not followed municipal building codes. The case went all the way to the Supreme Court of Canada where Fraser-Reid prevailed, and "Fraser-Reid v Droumtsekas" is often cited in Canadian civil law.

== See also ==
- List of University of Waterloo people
