= Sophie Vandebroek =

Belgian electrical engineer and business executive

- Born: Leuven, Belgium
- Citizenship: United States
- Education: KU Leuven, Cornell University
- Children: 3
- Scientific career
- Workplaces: IBM Research; Xerox

Sophie V. Vandebroek is a Belgian-born electrical engineer and business executive. She was the Chief Technology Officer of Xerox, and President of Xerox Innovation Group until December 2016. Vandebroek was CTO and a corporate vice president of Xerox corporation from 2006 till 2016. Following her Xerox career she became IBM Research Chief Operating Officer. After leaving IBM she served as Massachusetts Institute of Technology School of Engineering Inaugural Visiting Scholar for the 2019-2020 academic year. In 2021 she started her own company to provide strategic advisory services, called Strategic Vision Ventures LLC.

== Early life ==
Vandebroek was born in Leuven, Belgium. Her father was an engineer and her mother was an artist. As a seven-year old, she was inspired by the Moon landing to become an astronaut. She became an engineer instead, stating: “There was no degree to be an astronaut, so I decided to pursue a double major – electrical and mechanical engineering – this was the closest to it."

== Education ==
Vandebroek earned a bachelors degree in engineering and a master's degree in electromechanical engineering at KU Leuven University. She moved to the United States in 1986, on a Fulbright Fellowship and graduated with her PhD in electrical engineering from Cornell University in 1990.

== Career ==
Vandebroek first joined the IBM research labs in 1990 before moving on to Xerox in 1991. She has praised Xerox for "creating a supportive environment for women". Vandebroek was a director of the board of Analogic Corporation from 2008 to 2016 and has been a director of the board of IDEXX Laboratories since 2013.

Vandebroek has given talks at many conferences, including about artificial intelligence, cyber security, internet of everything and democratizing energy. She has been a member of the advisory council of the dean of engineering at the Massachusetts Institute of Technology since 2010 and was a member of the advisory council of the dean of engineering at Cornell University from 2005 until 2011. Vandebroek announced her intention to retire from Xerox at the end of 2016 when Xerox split into two companies.

Vandebroek accepted the Chief Operating Officer role at IBM Research in January 2017. That same year, she founded the MIT-IBM Watson AI Lab with the Massachusetts Institute of Technology.

She stepped down from IBM in July 2019 and became the inaugural MIT School of Engineering Visiting Scholar and mentored students. She joined the supervisory board of Wolters Kluwer in the Netherlands in 2020 and the board of Inari Agriculture, a Flagship Pioneering Company in 2021.

Vandebroek serves as a trustee at the Boston Museum of Sciences and at the Massachusetts Technology Leadership Council.

In May 2021 Vandebroek was elected as Honorary Professor at the KU Leuven Engineering Science Faculty, a five-year assignment.

== Personal life ==
Vandebroek has three adult children and lives in Boston, Massachusetts. She is a US citizen.

== Awards ==
Vandebroek was elected Institute of Electrical and Electronics Engineers Fellow in 2005. She became a foreign member of the Royal Flemish Academy of Belgium for Science and the Arts in 2010.

Vandebroek is featured in Women in Technology Hall of Fame, and on the Notable Women in Computing cards.
