= Neil Hanchard =

Jamaican physician and scientist

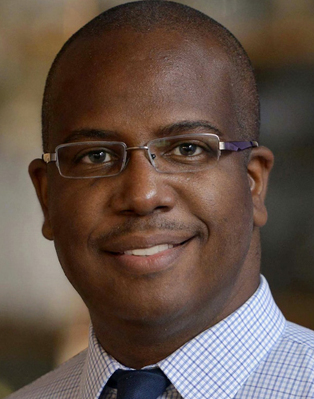
- Education: University of the West Indies, MBBS; Oxford University, PhD; Mayo Clinic, residency; Baylor College of Medicine, clinical fellowship
- Awards: Rhodes Scholar; Doris Duke Clinical Scientist Development Award; MBBS with Honours
- Scientific career
- Fields: genomics of complex childhood diseases; global health genomics
- Institutions: Baylor College of Medicine; National Human Genome Research Institute

Neil Hanchard is a Jamaican physician and scientist who is clinical investigator in the National Human Genome Research Institute (NHGRI), where he leads the Childhood Complex Disease Genomics section. Prior to joining NHGRI, he was an associate professor of molecular and human genetics at the Baylor College of Medicine. He is a fellow of the American College of Medical Genetics and Genomics, . Hanchard's research focuses on the genetics of childhood disease, with an emphasis on diseases impacting global health.

== Early life and education ==
Hanchard grew up in Jamaica. In 1999, he received a Bachelor of Medicine, Bachelor of Surgery degree from the University of the West Indies in Kingston, Jamaica. He then studied at the University of Oxford as a Rhodes Scholar. He received a Doctor of Philosophy degree from Oxford in 2004, and completed a residency in pediatrics at the Mayo Clinic in 2009. Subsequently, he completed a clinical fellowship in clinical genetics at the Baylor College of Medicine.

== Research ==
Hanchard's research focuses on genetic factors that can lead children to manifest especially severe symptoms of malnutrition, genomics of disease progression in children with HIV and tuberculosis, and genetic factors that contribute to comorbidities in sickle cell disease. He is a member of the Undiagnosed Diseases Network, and is interested in identifying molecular diagnoses for children with uncommon genetic disease symptoms.

In collaboration with the Human Heredity and Health in Africa (H3Africa) consortium, he was a senior author on a publication surveying human genetic diversity in Africa. The study was published in and featured on the cover of Nature, which described the work as "a milestone in genomics research". In this work, they sequenced the complete genomes of 426 African individuals who belonged to 50 distinct ethnolinguistic groups, including individuals from populations that had never previously been sequenced. The study revealed previously unknown historical human migration patterns, for example leading to insight into the history of the Berom people of Nigeria. It identified more than 3 million genetic variants that had not been previously observed, which could contribute to making genetic tests more accurate for people with African ancestry.

He has coauthored more than 70 peer reviewed articles. His papers have appeared in Nature, Science, and the American Journal of Human Genetics.

== Personal life ==
Hanchard is married with children.

== Selected publications ==
- Choudhury, A., Aron, S., Botigué, L.R. et al. High-depth African genomes inform human migration and health. Nature 586, 741–748 (2020). https://doi.org/10.1038/s41586-020-2859-7
- Schulze, K.V., Bhatt, A., Azamian, M.S. et al. Aberrant DNA methylation as a diagnostic biomarker of diabetic embryopathy. Genet Med 21, 2453–2461 (2019). https://doi.org/10.1038/s41436-019-0516-z
- Schulze, K.V., Swaminathan, S., Howell, S. et al. Edematous severe acute malnutrition is characterized by hypomethylation of DNA. Nat Commun 10, 5791 (2019). https://doi.org/10.1038/s41467-019-13433-6
- Retshabile, G, Mlotshwa, B.C., Williams, L et al. Whole-Exome Sequencing Reveals Uncaptured Variation and Distinct Ancestry in the Southern African Population of Botswana. Am J Hum Genet. 102 (5), 731-743 (2018). https://doi.org/10.1016/j.ajhg.2018.03.010
- Hanchard NA, Swaminathan S, Bucasas K et al. A genome-wide association study of congenital cardiovascular left-sided lesions shows association with a locus on chromosome 20. Hum Mol Genet. 25 (11), 2331-2341 (2016). https://doi.org/10.1093/hmg/ddw071
- Hanchard NA, Rockett KA, Spencer C, et al. Screening for recently selected alleles by analysis of human haplotype similarity. Am J Hum Genet. 78 (1), 153-9 (2006). https://doi.org/10.1086/499252
