= Coleyville, Jamaica =

Settlement in Jamaica

Coordinates: 18.019°N 76.846°W

Location of Coleyville in Jamaica

Coleyville is a settlement in Jamaica. It is located in Manchester Parish, in the central part of the country, 26 km (16 mi) north of Mandeville and 103 km west of the capital Kingston. Coleyville is 944 meters above sea level and has a population of 3,860.
