= Tahira Reid Smith =

American inventor and engineer

- Born: Bronx, New York, U.S.
- Education: Rensselaer Polytechnic Institute (BS, MS), University of Michigan (PhD)
- Known for: Invention of the automated Double Dutch machine
- Awards: Outstanding New Mechanical Engineering Educator by the American Society for Engineering Education (2018)
- Scientific career
- Fields: Mechanical engineering
- Workplaces: Pennsylvania State University

Tahira Reid Smith is an American inventor and mechanical engineering professor known for her invention of the automated Double Dutch machine.

== Early life and education ==
Tahira Reid Smith was born and raised in the Bronx, New York. Smith was born the only child and a first generation American to Jamaican immigrant parents. When in the third grade, Smith won a youth poster contest where she first came up with the idea for her Double Dutch machine. Smith received her bachelor's degree in mechanical engineering from the Rensselaer Polytechnic Institute (RPI) in 2000. During her undergraduate career, Smith took a class called "Introduction to Engineering Design" with Professor Burt Swersey, who would become her mentor and co-inventor for her double dutch patent. With direction from Swersey, Smith began to develop her Double Dutch machine. Smith also received her master's degree in mechanical engineering from RPI in 2004. In 2010, she obtained her PhD in Design Science from the University of Michigan.

== Career ==
Smith received her first patent for her Double Dutch machine in 1999. As part of the Lemelson Center's symposium, "The Playful Mind", Smith displayed her Double Dutch machine at the National Museum of American History in 2000. In 2003, she obtained her second patent for her Double Dutch invention. Because of her Double Dutch invention, Smith has been featured in the New York Times magazine, NBC's Today Show, and her story has been shared in a few children's books. She has received funding for projects from the National Science Foundation, Proctor and Gamble, and the Air Force Research Laboratory. Smith's research has been featured in several peer reviewed journals and conference publications. In 2018, Smith was presented with the American Society for Engineering Education Outstanding New Mechanical Engineering Educator award, along with being featured as an inventor in the Smithsonian Lemelson Center's Game Changers series.

Smith teaches undergraduate and graduate level courses in mechanical engineering at Purdue University. She also serves as the director of the Research in Engineering and Interdisciplinary Design (REID) Laboratory at Purdue University. She founded and serves as the co-chair of the Trailblazers in Engineering program at Purdue University. She also co-founded the Black in Engineering collective.

Smith was elected a Fellow of the American Society of Mechanical Engineers in 2024.
