= Peanut punch (drink) =

Drink

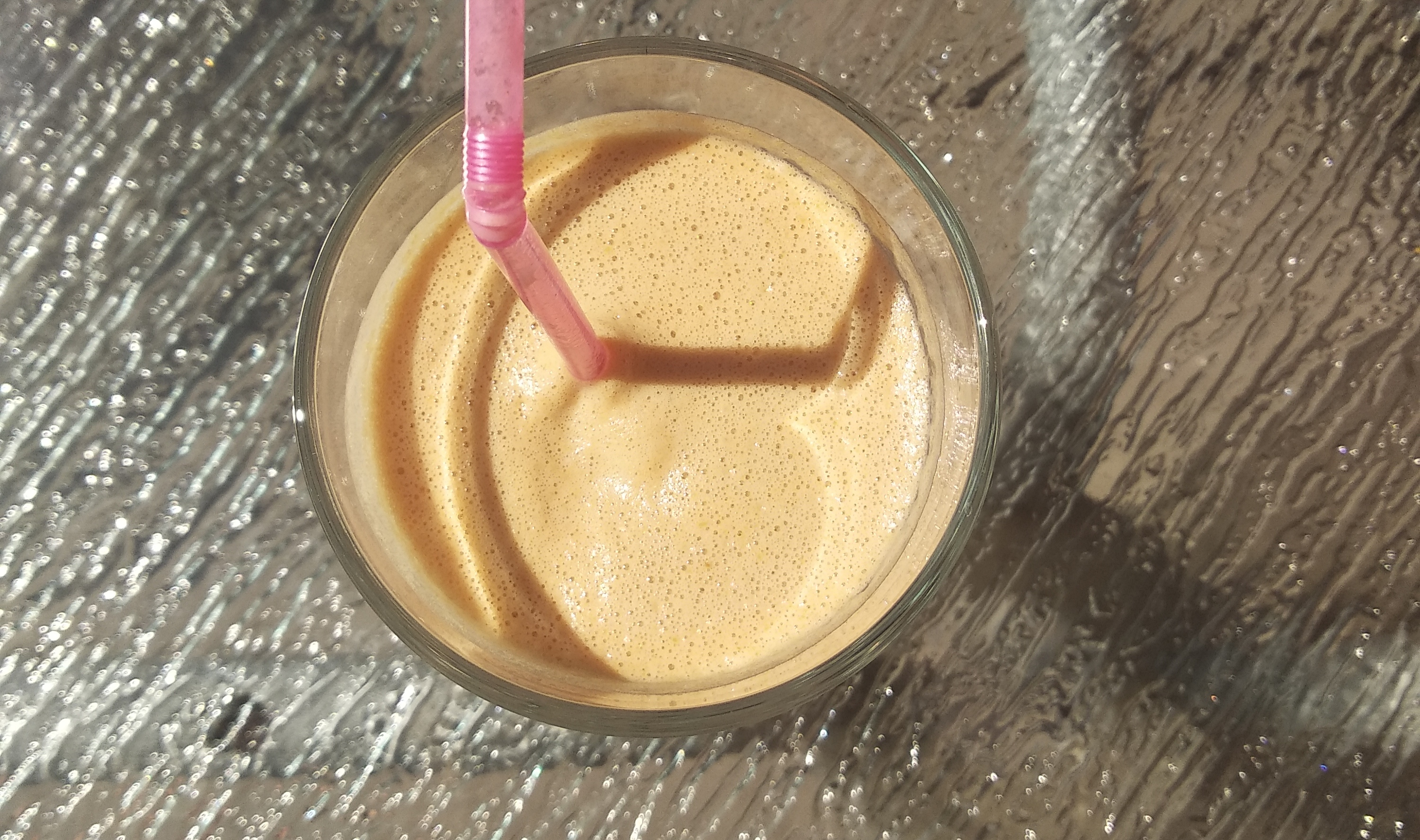
Peanut punch

Peanut punch is a beverage that is popular in the Caribbean. The main ingredients of the drink include peanuts or peanut butter, milk and sugar. Regular milk may be replaced or added to a mixture including condensed milk, spices (usually dominantly nutmeg and cinnamon), corn flakes, Angostura bitters, glucose powder and frequently granola mix. The drink is regarded by some to be an aphrodisiac due to its high fat, protein and overall energy content.

In Trinidad and Tobago, it is made with peanut butter, milk, sugar and sometimes spices. Rum is sometimes used as an ingredient. It is also available commercially in supermarkets and grocery stores.

In Jamaica, peanut punch is made with roasted peanuts, peanut butter, or commercial peanut powder mixes. White rum or stout beer is often added, as well as condensed milk or another sweetener with milk, water, and spices.

In the Dominican Republic, peanut punch is made with roasted peanuts, milk, cinnamon, cloves, sugar, and nutmeg. It is served with bread or crackers and typically made in the morning as a light breakfast.

In Puerto Rico, there are two versions of the drink, horchata de maní and coquito de maní. Horchata de maní is blended with roasted peanuts, sesame seeds or oats, water and a variety of spices. Coquito de maní is a Puerto Rican-style eggnog made with cream, coconut milk, peanuts, spices, eggs, and rum.

== See also ==
- List of peanut dishes
