= Coconut drop =

Jamaican coconut dessert

- Alternative names: Drops
- Type: Confectionery
- Course: Dessert
- Place of origin: Jamaica
- Region or state: Caribbean
- Serving temperature: Room temperature
- Main ingredients: Coconut; Brown sugar; Ginger

A coconut drop, also known simply as a “drop,” is a traditional Jamaican confection made by boiling small pieces of coconut in a mixture of brown sugar and spices, such as ginger and vanilla. The resulting syrupy mixture is then spooned onto a flat surface and allowed to cool, forming rough, irregularly shaped cakes.

== Ingredients and preparation ==
The primary ingredients in coconut drops are fresh coconut meat, brown sugar, and ginger. Additional flavorings, such as vanilla extract and nutmeg, are sometimes included to enhance the taste. The preparation involves boiling diced coconut pieces with grated ginger in water, then adding brown sugar and allowing the mixture to cook until it reduces to a thick, sticky consistency. Once the desired thickness is achieved, spoonfuls of the mixture are “dropped” onto a prepared surface, traditionally banana leaves, but parchment paper or greased baking sheets are commonly used today. The drops are left to cool and harden before consumption.

== Variations ==
While the classic coconut drop recipe remains prevalent, variations exist that incorporate additional spices like cinnamon or the use of alternative sweeteners. Some recipes suggest adding a pinch of salt to balance the sweetness. Additionally, the size and shape of the coconut pieces can vary, influencing the texture of the final product.

== See also ==
- List of Jamaican dishes
