= Amir H. Hoveyda =

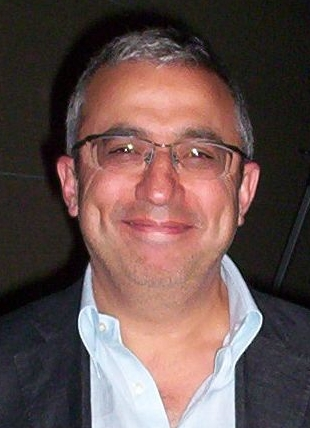
- Amir Hoveyda at the 2007 ACS conference in Boston
- Education: Yale University (PhD 1986)
- Known for: Developing catalysts for stereoselective olefin metathesis,
- Scientific career
- Fields: Organic chemistry
- Institutions: Harvard University, Boston College, University of Strasbourg
- Doctoral advisor: Stuart Schreiber
- Other academic advisors: David A. Evans
- Doctoral students: Jeannette Garcia; M. Kevin Brown

Amir H. Hoveyda is an American organic chemist and professor of chemistry at Boston College, and held the position of department chair until 2018. In 2019, he embarked as researcher at the Institute of Science and Supramolecular Engineering at University of Strasbourg.

Hoveyda received his Ph.D. from Yale University under Stuart Schreiber in 1986, and worked as postdoctoral fellow in the lab of David A. Evans at Harvard University.

He received the Arthur C. Cope Scholar Award from the American Chemical Society (ACS) in 1998, the ACS Award for Creative Work in Organic Synthesis as well as the ENI award in 2014, and the ACS Herbert C. Brown Award for Creative Research in Synthetic Methods in 2020. In 2011, Hoveyda was ranked among the Top 100 Chemists in an analysis by Thomson Reuters.

Hoveyda's research focuses on the development for chemoselective and stereoselective catalysis, in particular function-oriented catalyst design. He is particularly noted for his work on developing catalysts for stereoselective olefin metathesis, such as the Hoveyda–Grubbs catalyst. In recent years he has worked extensively on copper(I)-N-heterocyclic carbenes complex catalyzed allyl addition, allylic substitution and conjugate addition reactions. His research also involves metal-free catalysis, e.g. catalytic stereoselective allyl addition reactions promoted by chiral aminophenol-derived ligands, as well as bioactive molecules synthesis.
