= Simone Badal-McCreath =

Jamaican chemist and cancer researcher

Simone Badal McCreath
- Born: Simone Ann Marie Badal
- Education: University of the West Indies
- Known for: cell line research
- Scientific career
- Fields: Cancer research

Simone Ann Marie Badal McCreath is a cancer researcher and a medical sciences lecturer known for the creation of the first ever prostate and breast cancer cells lines that were derived from Black people.

== Life and career ==
The daughter of a shop keeper, Badal McCreath's mother left the family when she was young; and, she had a step-mother and they did not get along. Badal McCreath's science education was hindered by a lack of teachers at her local school, and it was only when she reached University that she decided to become a researcher. Badal McCreath grew up in a poor community where no one in her family had ever attended college.

While attending The University of the West Indies, Badal McCreath decided not to practice medicine but to build a career in research. "There was this one professor who taught biochemistry," she says. "I remember falling in love with biochemistry right then and there." Badal McCreath was chosen among 25 scientists worldwide for the inaugural "Rising Scholars: Breast Cancer Program". She led a team at The University of the West Indies (UWI) in creating the first cancer cell line from the Caribbean in 2022 during the COVID-19 pandemic. The intent was to create more cancer cell lines for black people in the fight against prostate and breast cancer.

== Awards ==
On February 15, 2014, Badal McCreath, along with four other women chemists from across the world, was awarded the Elsevier Foundation Awards for Early Career Women Scientists in the Developing World. The winning researchers represented five regions of the developing world from Indonesia, Jamaica, Nigeria, Uzbekistan and Yemen.

== Bibliography ==
- Badal McCreath, Simone (September 11, 2023). No Cell Left Behind: A Jamaican Scientist's Breakthrough to the First Caribbean Cell Line, ACRJ-PC28. ISBN 978-9768332073.
