= Walt Braithwaite =

American engineer

Walt W. Braithwaite

Personal details
- Born: 1945 (age 80–81) Kingston, Jamaica
- Spouse: Rita Braithwaite
- Children: 3
- Education: University of Washington, M.S. in computer science, 1975; Massachusetts Institute of Technology, Boeing Sloan Fellow, master’s degree in business management in 1981.
- Occupation: President of Boeing Africa (2000 - 2003)

Walt W. Braithwaite (born January 1945) is a Jamaican-Born American engineer and former executive at Boeing. He played an integral role in the introduction and use of CAD/CAM and IGES technology at Boeing and in 2000 was named as Boeing's President of Boeing Africa. He has received the Black Engineer of the Year and Pathfinder Awards and the Walt E. Braithwaite Legacy Award is named in his honor.

== Early life and education ==
Braithwaite was born in Kingston, Jamaica in January 1945. His father, Ivanhoe Brathwaite, worked as both a laborer and was in sales. His mother, Ivy Braithwaite, worked as a beautician, seamstress, and embroiderer. Braithwaite also had one sister.

After deciding as a child his career would be in engineering, Braithwaite gained experience at a local maritime machine shop through an apprenticeship. In addition, he learned about diesel engineering by taking a correspondence course. Braithwaite's family moved to England during his teen years, where he attended Hackney Technical College in London while working towards a certificate in mechanical engineering. To complete this education, he moved to Chicago, Illinois.

Braithwaite received a bachelors of science degree in Engineering in 1965 from the American Institute of Engineering and Technology. While working at Boeing, he received a two masters degrees; one in Computer Science in 1975 from the University of Washington and one in Industrial Management from the Massachusetts Institute of Technology in 1981 while serving as a Boeing Sloan Fellow. After beginning a Ph.D. at the University of Washington, Braithwaite completed his Ph.D. in technology and business processes at Rushmore University.

== Career ==
Braithwaite joined Boeing in 1966 as an associate tool engineer in the Fabrication Division. In 1975 he was the senior engineer responsible for developing Boeing's use of computer technology by using CAD/CAM in the design of commercial airplanes. Over the next several decades Braithwaite's teams oversaw the engineering development of the 707, 727, and 737 and later as head of engineering operations for the 747, 767 programs and the 777, the first commercial aircraft to be designed entirely with computer-aided design. Braithwaite also created and served as the pioneer for the implementation of the Initial Graphics Exchange Specification (IGES).

In 1991, Braithwaite was named as vice president of information systems and architecture at Boeing. In 1994, Braithwaite was named vice president of all information systems activities for Boeing Commercial Air-plane Group. In 2000 Boeing named Braithwaite President of Boeing Africa, responsible for overseeing corporate activities in the region and acting as an ambassador and liaison between local governments and Boeing divisions in the region. After 36 years with Boeing, Braithwaite retired in 2003 as the highest-ranking black executive in Boeing's history.

During his time at Boeing, Braithwaite was known as a quiet person who listened more than talked. Although he at one time was told by a manager that he needed to be aggressive, this same manager later came to value Braithwaite's knowledge, wisdom, and personal integrity. Braithwaite also created a mentoring program during his time at Boeing.

== Personal life ==
Braithwaite volunteered with the YMCA Black Achievers program and is a member of Sigma Pi Phi fraternity.

== Accolades ==
- 1987 Joseph Marie Jacquard Memorial Award
- 1995 Black Engineer of the Year Award
- 1996 History Makers Award in Science and Technology
- 1998 Honorary Doctorate of Laws from University of the West Indies
- 2017 Pathfinder Award

The Walt W. Braithwaite Legacy Award was named after Braithwaite.
