= List of members of the Montgomery County Council (Maryland) =

Montgomery County Council
- Coat of Arms

- Flag

Type
- Type: Unicameral
- Term limits: 3 consecutive terms

History
- Founded: 1948
- Preceded by: Montgomery County Board of Commissioners

Leadership
- Council President: Natali Fani-González, Democratic since December 2025
- Council Vice President: Marilyn Balcombe, Democratic since December 20235

Structure
- Seats: 11
- Political groups: Majority (11): Democratic (11)
- Committees: Audit; Economic Development (ECON); Education & Culture (EC); Government Operations and Fiscal Policy (GO); Heath and Human Services (HHS); Planning, Housing & Parks (PHP); Public Safety (PS); Transportation & Environment (TE)
- Length of term: Full council elected every 4 years
- Authority: Article I, Charter of Montgomery County
- Salary: Council President: $154,408.18/year; Councilmembers: $140,371.07/year

Elections
- Voting system: First-past-the-post
- First election: November 3, 1948
- Last election: November 8, 2022
- Next election: November 3, 2026
- Redistricting: Recommendations by the legislature-appointed commission, approval by legislature.

Motto
- French: Gardez Bien (English: Watch Well)

Meeting place
- Stella B. Werner Council Office Building

Website
- Council Website

Constitution
- Charter

Rules
- Rules of Proceduce

The following is a list of members of the Montgomery County Council since its creation.

== Current members ==
The members of the County Council as of 2026 are:

County Council
Position	Name	Affiliation	District	Neighborhoods	First Elected
Member	Andrew Friedson	Democratic	1	Potomac, Bethesda, Chevy Chase	2018
Vice President	Marilyn Balcombe	Democratic	2	Germantown, Clarksburg, Darnestown, Poolesville	2022
Member	Sidney A. Katz	Democratic	3	Gaithersburg, Rockville	2014
President	Kate Stewart	Democratic	4	Silver Spring, Takoma Park	2022
Member	Kristin Mink	Democratic	5	Four Corners, Cloverly, Burtonsville	2022
President	Natali Fani-González	Democratic	6	Wheaton, Glenmont, Derwood, Aspen Hill, Forest Glen Park	2022
Member	Dawn Luedtke	Democratic	7	Olney, Ashton, Laytonsville, Montgomery Village, Damascus	2022
Member	Evan Glass	Democratic	At-Large	Entire county	2018
Member	Shebra Evans	Democratic	At-Large	Entire county	–
Member	Will Jawando	Democratic	At-Large	Entire county	2018
Member	Laurie-Anne Sayles	Democratic	At-Large	Entire county	2022

== Past members ==
Background colors indicate party:

Democratic	Republican	Independent

=== 1949-70: Council–Manager form of government ===
Period	Year	District 1	District 2	District 3	District 4	District 5	At-large	
1	1949	P. Garland Ligon	Augustus R. Selby	Thomas C. Kelley	Mrs. Ralph E. Himstead	J. Douglas Bradshaw	Frederic P. Lee	Lewis Meriam
1	1950	P. Garland Ligon	Augustus R. Selby	Thomas C. Kelley	Mrs. Ralph E. Himstead	J. Douglas Bradshaw	Frederic P. Lee	Harold F. Hammond (Note: Replaced Lewis Meriam, April 1950.)
2	1951	J. Louis Monarch	Grover K. Walker	George F. Nesbitt	Stella B. Werner	Lathrop E. Smith	Kathryn J. Lawlor	Harold F. Hammond
2	1952	J. Louis Monarch	Grover K. Walker	George F. Nesbitt	Stella B. Werner	Lathrop E. Smith	Kathryn J. Lawlor	Harold F. Hammond
2	1953	J. Louis Monarch	Grover K. Walker	George F. Nesbitt	Stella B. Werner	Lathrop E. Smith	Louis A. Gravelle (Note: Replaced Kathryn J. Lawlor, January 1953.)	Harold F. Hammond
2	1954	J. Louis Monarch	Grover K. Walker	George F. Nesbitt	Stella B. Werner	Lathrop E. Smith	Louis A. Gravelle	Harold F. Hammond
3			Grover K. Walker		Stella B. Werner	Lathrop E. Smith		
3	1955	J. Grahame Walker	Grover K. Walker	Charles H. Jamison	Stella B. Werner	Robert T. Snure	Wilbur N. Baughman	Jerry T. Williams
3	1956	J. Grahame Walker	Grover K. Walker	Charles H. Jamison	Stella B. Werner	Robert T. Snure	Wilbur N. Baughman	Jerry T. Williams
3	1957	J. Grahame Walker	Grover K. Walker	Charles H. Jamison	Stella B. Werner	Robert T. Snure	Wilbur N. Baughman	Jerry T. Williams
3	1958	J. Grahame Walker	Grover K. Walker	Charles H. Jamison	Stella B. Werner	Robert T. Snure	Wilbur N. Baughman	Jerry T. Williams
4			Grover K. Walker		Stella B. Werner			Jerry T. Williams
4	1959	Stanley B. Frosh	Grover K. Walker	William F. Hickey	Stella B. Werner	B. Houston McCeney	David L. Cahoon	Jerry T. Williams
4	1960	Stanley B. Frosh	Grover K. Walker	William F. Hickey	Stella B. Werner	B. Houston McCeney	David L. Cahoon	Jerry T. Williams
4	1961	Stanley B. Frosh	Grover K. Walker	William F. Hickey	Stella B. Werner	B. Houston McCeney	David L. Cahoon	Jerry T. Williams
4	1962	Stanley B. Frosh	Grover K. Walker	William F. Hickey	Stella B. Werner	B. Houston McCeney	David L. Cahoon	Jerry T. Williams
5			Grover K. Walker		Stella B. Werner			Jerry T. Williams
5	1963	John A. Floyd	Grover K. Walker	Mary A. Hepburn	John H. Hiser	Thomas M. Wilson	Kathryn E. Diggs	Jerry T. Williams
5	1964	John A. Floyd	Grover K. Walker	Mary A. Hepburn	John H. Hiser	Cleatus E. Barnett (Note: Replaced Thomas M. Wilson, December 1964.)	Kathryn E. Diggs	Jerry T. Williams
5	1965	John A. Floyd	Grover K. Walker	Mary A. Hepburn	John H. Hiser	Cleatus E. Barnett	Kathryn E. Diggs	William C. Birely (Note: Replaced Jerry T. Williams, December 1965.)
5	1966	John A. Floyd	Grover K. Walker	Mary A. Hepburn	John H. Hiser	Cleatus E. Barnett	Kathryn E. Diggs	William C. Birely
6			Grover K. Walker			Cleatus E. Barnett		
6	1967	William W. Greenhalgh	Richmond M. Keeney	Rose C. Kramer	David Scull	Cleatus E. Barnett	Idamae Garrott	Avis Birely
6	1968	William W. Greenhalgh	Richmond M. Keeney	Rose C. Kramer	James P. Gleason (Note: Replaced David Scull after his death, March 1968.)	Cleatus E. Barnett	Idamae Garrott	Avis Birely
6	1969	William W. Greenhalgh	Richmond M. Keeney	Rose C. Kramer	James P. Gleason	Cleatus E. Barnett	Idamae Garrott	Avis Birely
6	1970	William W. Greenhalgh	Richmond M. Keeney	Rose C. Kramer	James P. Gleason	Cleatus E. Barnett	Idamae Garrott	Avis Birely

=== 1971–present: Council–Executive form of government ===
The Council has expanded twice under this form of government. Two new at-large seats were added in 1990 after having been previously approved of by voters in the 1986 election. Two new district seats were added in 2022 after having been previously approved of by voters in the 2020 election.

Period	Year	District 1	District 2	District 3	District 4	District 5	District 6	District 7	At-large			
7	1971	Neal Potter	Dickran Y. Hovsepian	Idamae Garrott	Sidney Kramer	William Sher			William H. Willcox	Elizabeth L. Scull		
7	1972	Neal Potter	Dickran Y. Hovsepian	Idamae Garrott	Sidney Kramer	William Sher			Norman L. Christeller (Note: Replaced William H. Willcox after his resignation, October 1972.)	Elizabeth L. Scull		
7	1973	Neal Potter	Dickran Y. Hovsepian	Idamae Garrott	Sidney Kramer	William Sher			Norman L. Christeller	Elizabeth L. Scull		
7	1974	Neal Potter	Dickran Y. Hovsepian	Idamae Garrott	Sidney Kramer	William Sher			Norman L. Christeller	Elizabeth L. Scull		
8	1975	Neal Potter	Dickran Y. Hovsepian	Esther P. Gelman	Jane Anne Moore	Elizabeth L. Scull			Norman L. Christeller	John L. Menke		
8	1976	Neal Potter	Dickran Y. Hovsepian	Esther P. Gelman	Jane Anne Moore	Elizabeth L. Scull			Norman L. Christeller	John L. Menke		
8	1977	Neal Potter	Dickran Y. Hovsepian	Esther P. Gelman	Jane Anne Moore	Elizabeth L. Scull			Norman L. Christeller	John L. Menke		
8	1978	Neal Potter	Dickran Y. Hovsepian	Esther P. Gelman	Jane Anne Moore	Elizabeth L. Scull			William Colman (Note: Replaced Norman L. Christeller, February 1978.)	John L. Menke		
9	1979	Neal Potter	Ruth Spector	Esther P. Gelman	Michael L. Gudis	Elizabeth L. Scull			Scott Fosler	Rose Crenca		
9	1980	Neal Potter	Ruth Spector	Esther P. Gelman	Michael L. Gudis	Elizabeth L. Scull			Scott Fosler	Rose Crenca		
9	1981	Neal Potter	Ruth Spector	Esther P. Gelman	Michael L. Gudis	David L. Scull (Note: Replaced Elizabeth L. Scull after her death, June 1981.)			Scott Fosler	Rose Crenca		
9	1982	Neal Potter	Ruth Spector	Esther P. Gelman	Michael L. Gudis	David L. Scull			Scott Fosler	Rose Crenca		
10	1983	Scott Fosler	Esther P. Gelman	William E. Hanna, Jr.	Michael L. Gudis	Rose Crenca			Neal Potter	David L. Scull		
10	1984	Scott Fosler	Esther P. Gelman	William E. Hanna, Jr.	Michael L. Gudis	Rose Crenca			Neal Potter	David L. Scull		
10	1985	Scott Fosler	Esther P. Gelman	William E. Hanna, Jr.	Michael L. Gudis	Rose Crenca			Neal Potter	David L. Scull		
10	1986	Scott Fosler	Esther P. Gelman	William E. Hanna, Jr.	Michael L. Gudis	Rose Crenca			Neal Potter	David L. Scull		
11	1987	Neal Potter	Michael L. Subin	William E. Hanna, Jr.	Michael L. Gudis	Rose Crenca			Isiah Leggett	Bruce Adams		
11	1988	Neal Potter	Michael L. Subin	William E. Hanna, Jr.	Michael L. Gudis	Rose Crenca			Isiah Leggett	Bruce Adams		
11	1989	Neal Potter	Michael L. Subin	William E. Hanna, Jr.	Michael L. Gudis	Rose Crenca			Isiah Leggett	Bruce Adams		
11	1990	Neal Potter	Michael L. Subin	William E. Hanna, Jr.	Michael L. Gudis	Rose Crenca			Isiah Leggett	Bruce Adams		
12	1991	Betty Ann Krahnke	Nancy Dacek	William E. Hanna, Jr.	Marilyn J. Praisner	Derick Berlage			Isiah Leggett	Bruce Adams	Gail Ewing (Note: Seat established in 1991.)	Michael L. Subin
12	1992	Betty Ann Krahnke	Nancy Dacek	William E. Hanna, Jr.	Marilyn J. Praisner	Derick Berlage			Isiah Leggett	Bruce Adams	Gail Ewing	Michael L. Subin
12	1993	Betty Ann Krahnke	Nancy Dacek	William E. Hanna, Jr.	Marilyn J. Praisner	Derick Berlage			Isiah Leggett	Bruce Adams	Gail Ewing	Michael L. Subin
12	1994	Betty Ann Krahnke	Nancy Dacek	William E. Hanna, Jr.	Marilyn J. Praisner	Derick Berlage			Isiah Leggett	Bruce Adams	Gail Ewing	Michael L. Subin
13	1995	Betty Ann Krahnke	Nancy Dacek	William E. Hanna, Jr.	Marilyn J. Praisner	Derick Berlage			Isiah Leggett	Neal Potter	Gail Ewing	Michael L. Subin
13	1996	Betty Ann Krahnke	Nancy Dacek	William E. Hanna, Jr.	Marilyn J. Praisner	Derick Berlage			Isiah Leggett	Neal Potter	Gail Ewing	Michael L. Subin
13	1997	Betty Ann Krahnke	Nancy Dacek	William E. Hanna, Jr.	Marilyn J. Praisner	Derick Berlage			Isiah Leggett	Neal Potter	Gail Ewing	Michael L. Subin
13	1998	Betty Ann Krahnke	Nancy Dacek	William E. Hanna, Jr.	Marilyn J. Praisner	Derick Berlage			Isiah Leggett	Neal Potter	Gail Ewing	Michael L. Subin
14	1999	Betty Ann Krahnke	Nancy Dacek	Phil Andrews	Marilyn J. Praisner	Derick Berlage			Isiah Leggett	Steven A. Silverman	Gail Ewing	Michael L. Subin
14	2000	Howard A. Denis (Note: Replaced Betty Ann Krahnke after her resignation, April 2000.)	Nancy Dacek	Phil Andrews	Marilyn J. Praisner	Derick Berlage			Isiah Leggett	Steven A. Silverman	Gail Ewing	Michael L. Subin
14	2001	Howard A. Denis	Nancy Dacek	Phil Andrews	Marilyn J. Praisner	Derick Berlage			Isiah Leggett	Steven A. Silverman	Gail Ewing	Michael L. Subin
14	2002	Howard A. Denis	Nancy Dacek	Phil Andrews	Marilyn J. Praisner	Donell Peterman (Note: Replaced Derick Berlage after his resignation, July 2002.)			Isiah Leggett	Steven A. Silverman	Gail Ewing	Michael L. Subin
15	2003	Howard A. Denis	Michael J. Knapp	Phil Andrews	Marilyn J. Praisner	Thomas E. Perez			Nancy M. Floreen	Steven A. Silverman	George L. Leventhal	Michael L. Subin
15	2004	Howard A. Denis	Michael J. Knapp	Phil Andrews	Marilyn J. Praisner	Thomas E. Perez			Nancy M. Floreen	Steven A. Silverman	George L. Leventhal	Michael L. Subin
15	2005	Howard A. Denis	Michael J. Knapp	Phil Andrews	Marilyn J. Praisner	Thomas E. Perez			Nancy M. Floreen	Steven A. Silverman	George L. Leventhal	Michael L. Subin
15	2006	Howard A. Denis	Michael J. Knapp	Phil Andrews	Marilyn J. Praisner	Thomas E. Perez			Nancy M. Floreen	Steven A. Silverman	George L. Leventhal	Michael L. Subin
16	2007	Roger Berliner	Michael J. Knapp	Phil Andrews	Marilyn J. Praisner	Valerie Ervin			Nancy M. Floreen	Duchy Trachtenberg	George L. Leventhal	Marc Elrich
16	2008	Roger Berliner	Michael J. Knapp	Phil Andrews	Donald Praisner (Note: Replaced Marilyn J. Praisner after her death, May 2008.)	Valerie Ervin			Nancy M. Floreen	Duchy Trachtenberg	George L. Leventhal	Marc Elrich
16	2009	Roger Berliner	Michael J. Knapp	Phil Andrews	Nancy Navarro (Note: Replaced Donald Praisner after his death, May 2009.)	Valerie Ervin			Nancy M. Floreen	Duchy Trachtenberg	George L. Leventhal	Marc Elrich
16	2010	Roger Berliner	Michael J. Knapp	Phil Andrews	Nancy Navarro	Valerie Ervin			Nancy M. Floreen	Duchy Trachtenberg	George L. Leventhal	Marc Elrich
17	2011	Roger Berliner	Craig L. Rice	Phil Andrews	Nancy Navarro	Valerie Ervin			Nancy M. Floreen	Hans Riemer	George L. Leventhal	Marc Elrich
17	2012	Roger Berliner	Craig L. Rice	Phil Andrews	Nancy Navarro	Valerie Ervin			Nancy M. Floreen	Hans Riemer	George L. Leventhal	Marc Elrich
17	2013	Roger Berliner	Craig L. Rice	Phil Andrews	Nancy Navarro	Valerie Ervin			Nancy M. Floreen	Hans Riemer	George L. Leventhal	Marc Elrich
17	2014	Roger Berliner	Craig L. Rice	Phil Andrews	Nancy Navarro	Cherri Branson (Note: Replaced Valerie Ervin after her resignation, January 2014.)			Nancy M. Floreen	Hans Riemer	George L. Leventhal	Marc Elrich
18	2015	Roger Berliner	Craig L. Rice	Sidney A. Katz	Nancy Navarro	Tom Hucker			Nancy M. Floreen	Hans Riemer	George L. Leventhal	Marc Elrich
18	2016	Roger Berliner	Craig L. Rice	Sidney A. Katz	Nancy Navarro	Tom Hucker			Nancy M. Floreen	Hans Riemer	George L. Leventhal	Marc Elrich
18	2017	Roger Berliner	Craig L. Rice	Sidney A. Katz	Nancy Navarro	Tom Hucker			Nancy M. Floreen	Hans Riemer	George L. Leventhal	Marc Elrich
18	2018	Roger Berliner	Craig L. Rice	Sidney A. Katz	Nancy Navarro	Tom Hucker			Nancy M. Floreen	Hans Riemer	George L. Leventhal	Marc Elrich
19	2019	Andrew Friedson	Craig L. Rice	Sidney A. Katz	Nancy Navarro	Tom Hucker			Gabe Albornoz	Hans Riemer	Evan Glass	Will Jawando
19	2020	Andrew Friedson	Craig L. Rice	Sidney A. Katz	Nancy Navarro	Tom Hucker			Gabe Albornoz	Hans Riemer	Evan Glass	Will Jawando
19	2021	Andrew Friedson	Craig L. Rice	Sidney A. Katz	Nancy Navarro	Tom Hucker			Gabe Albornoz	Hans Riemer	Evan Glass	Will Jawando
19	2022	Andrew Friedson	Craig L. Rice	Sidney A. Katz	Nancy Navarro	Tom Hucker			Gabe Albornoz	Hans Riemer	Evan Glass	Will Jawando
20	2023	Andrew Friedson	Marilyn Balcombe	Sidney A. Katz	Kate Stewart	Kristin Mink	Natali Fani-González (Note: Seat established in 2022.)	Dawn Luedtke	Gabe Albornoz	Laurie-Anne Sayles	Evan Glass	Will Jawando
20	2024	Andrew Friedson	Marilyn Balcombe	Sidney A. Katz	Kate Stewart	Kristin Mink	Natali Fani-González	Dawn Luedtke	Gabe Albornoz	Laurie-Anne Sayles	Evan Glass	Will Jawando
20	2025	Andrew Friedson	Marilyn Balcombe	Sidney A. Katz	Kate Stewart	Kristin Mink	Natali Fani-González	Dawn Luedtke	Gabe Albornoz	Laurie-Anne Sayles	Evan Glass	Will Jawando
20	2026	Andrew Friedson	Marilyn Balcombe	Sidney A. Katz	Kate Stewart	Kristin Mink	Natali Fani-González	Dawn Luedtke	Shebra Evans (Note: Replaced Gabe Albornoz after his resignation, December 2025.)	Laurie-Anne Sayles	Evan Glass	Will Jawando

== Past presidents ==
The position of County Council President was first created in the seventh term of the council, in 1970. The position is re-elected each year by the members of the council, who also vote for a Vice President simultaneously.

County Council President
Period	Position	Name	Party	Term
7	1st	Idamae Garrott	Democratic	1970–1971
7	2nd	Dickran Y. Hovsepian	Democratic	1971-1972
7	3rd	William Sher	Democratic	1972-1973
7	4th	Neal Potter	Democratic	1973-1974
8	1st	Dickran Y. Hovsepian	Democratic	1974-1975
8	2nd	Norman L. Christeller	Democratic	1975-1976
8	3rd	John L. Menke	Democratic	1976-1977
8	4th	Elizabeth L. Scull	Democratic	1977-1978
9	1st	Neal Potter	Democratic	1978-1979
9	2nd	Scott Fosler	Democratic	1979-1980
9	3rd	Ruth Spector	Democratic	1980-1981
9	4th	Neal Potter	Democratic	1981-1982
10	1st	David L. Scull	Democratic	1982-1983
10	2nd	Esther P. Gelman	Democratic	1983-1984
10	3rd	Michael L. Gudis	Democratic	1984-1985
10	4th	William E. Hanna	Democratic	1985-1986
11	1st	Rose Crenca	Democratic	1986-1987
11	2nd	Michael L. Subin	Democratic	1987-1988
11	3rd	Michael L. Gudis	Democratic	1988-1989
11	4th	William E. Hanna, Jr.	Democratic	1989-1990
12	1st	Isiah Leggett	Democratic	1990-1991
12	2nd	Bruce Adams	Democratic	1991-1992
12	3rd	Marilyn J. Praisner	Democratic	1992-1993
12	4th	William E. Hanna, Jr.	Democratic	1993-1994
13	1st	Derick Berlage	Democratic	1994-1995
13	2nd	Gail Ewing	Democratic	1995-1996
13	3rd	Marilyn J. Praisner	Democratic	1996-1997
13	4th	Isiah Leggett	Democratic	1997-1998
14	1st	Isiah Leggett	Democratic	1998-1999
14	2nd	Michael L. Subin	Democratic	1999-2000
14	3rd	Blair G. Ewing	Democratic	2000-2001
14	4th	Steven A. Silverman	Democratic	2001-2002
15	1st	Michael L. Subin	Democratic	2002-2003
15	2nd	Steven A. Silverman	Democratic	2003-2004
15	3rd	Tom Perez	Democratic	2004-2005
15	4th	George L. Leventhal	Democratic	2005-2006
16	1st	Marilyn Praisner	Democratic	2006-2007
16	2nd	Michael J. Knapp	Democratic	2007-2008
16	3rd	Phil Andrews	Democratic	2008-2009
16	4th	Nancy M. Floreen	Democratic	2009-2010
17	1st	Valerie Ervin	Democratic	2010-2011
17	2nd	Roger Berliner Vice President: Nancy Navarro	Democratic	2011-2012
17	3rd	Nancy Navarro Vice President: Craig L. Rice	Democratic	2012-2013
17	4th	Craig L. Rice Vice President: George L. Leventhal	Democratic	2013-2014
18	1st	George L. Leventhal Vice President: Nancy M. Floreen	Democratic	2014-2015
18	2nd	Nancy M. Floreen Vice President: Roger Berliner	Democratic	2015-2016
18	3rd	Roger Berliner Vice President: Craig L. Rice	Democratic	2016-2017
18	4th	Hans Riemer Vice President: Nancy Navarro	Democratic	2017-2018
19	1st	Nancy Navarro Vice President: Sidney A. Katz	Democratic	2018-2019
19	2nd	Sidney A. Katz Vice President: Tom Hucker	Democratic	2019-2020
19	3rd	Tom Hucker Vice President: Gabe Albornoz	Democratic	2020-2021
19	4th	Gabe Albornoz Vice President: Evan Glass	Democratic	2021-2022
20	1st	Evan Glass Vice President: Andrew Friedson	Democratic	2022-2023
20	2nd	Andrew Friedson Vice President: Kate Stewart	Democratic	2023-2024
20	3rd	Kate Stewart Vice President: Will Jawando	Democratic	2024–2025
20	4th	Natali Fani-González Vice President: Marilyn Balcombe	Democratic	2025–present
