= Will Jawando =

American politician (born 1983)

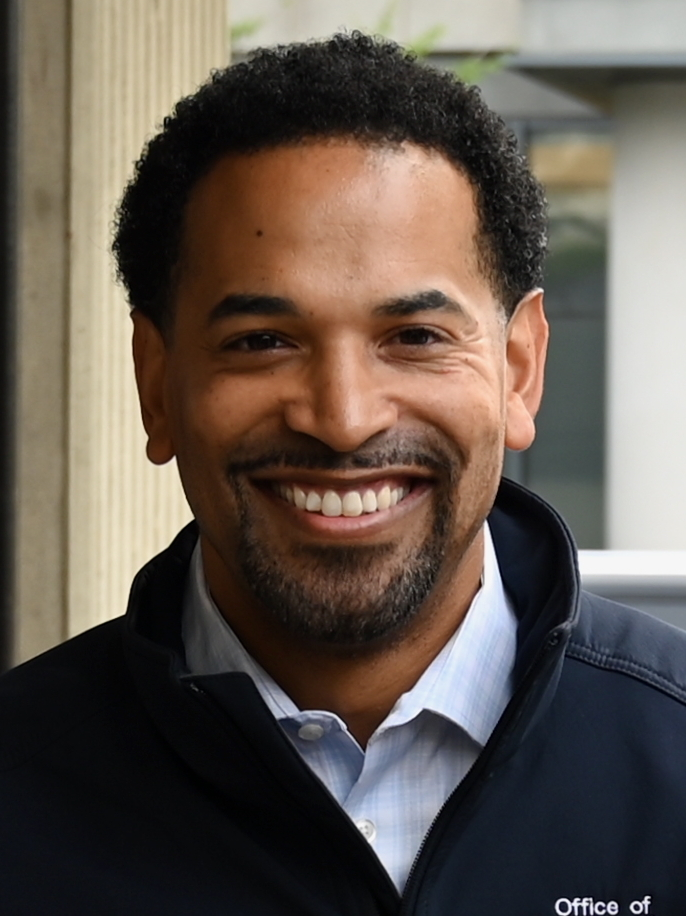

Executive-elect of Montgomery County
- Assuming office December 7, 2026
- Succeeding: Marc Elrich

Member of the Montgomery County Council from the at-large district
- Incumbent
- Assumed office December 3, 2018
- Preceded by: Marc Elrich; Nancy Floreen; George Leventhal

Personal details
- Born: William Opeyemi Jawando; January 2, 1983 (age 43) Silver Spring, Maryland, U.S.
- Party: Democratic
- Spouse: Michele Lawrence (m. 2006)
- Children: 4
- Education: Catholic University (BA, JD)
- Website: Campaign website

William Opeyemi Jawando (born January 2, 1983) is an American politician and author who is the county executive-elect of Montgomery County, Maryland. A member of the Democratic Party, he has served as an at-large member of the Montgomery County Council since 2018.

Born and raised in Silver Spring, Maryland, Jawando graduated from the Catholic University of America and the Columbus School of Law. He started his career as an intern for multiple Democratic members of Congress before working as an official in the U.S. Department of Education and the Office of Public Engagement during the Obama administration. He unsuccessfully ran for the Maryland House of Delegates in 2014 and the U.S. House of Representatives in 2016 before winning election as an at-large member of the Montgomery County Council in 2018. Jawando was briefly a candidate for U.S. Senate in 2024.

Jawando was elected as the county executive of Montgomery County in 2026, after defeating Republican nominee Esther Wells in the general election.

== Background ==
Jawando was born in Silver Spring, Maryland, on January 2, 1983. He is biracial, with a white mother from Kansas, Kathleen Gross, and a Nigerian father, Olayinka Jawando, who divorced when Jawando was six years old. He attended the Catholic University of America, where he earned a B.A. degree in sociology in 2004 and a J.D. degree in 2007. Jawando also played Division III level basketball at Catholic University.

In May 2022, Farrar, Straus and Giroux published Jawando's autobiography, My Seven Black Fathers. The book follows his early life and career, with each of the book's chapters describing each of his "fathers".

== Political career ==
Jawando first got involved in politics as a student at Catholic University, where he made efforts to establish a campus NAACP chapter, which was resisted by the school over the organization's stance on abortion. After national pressure, including from then-President and CEO of the NAACP Kweisi Mfume, the university ultimately backtracked and allowed the chapter's formation. He later worked as an intern for then-House Minority Leader Nancy Pelosi, then-U.S. Senator Barack Obama, and U.S. Senator Sherrod Brown until 2009. Afterwards, he worked in the United States Department of Education and the Office of Public Engagement until 2012.

=== 2014 Maryland House of Delegates campaign ===
In 2014, Jawando ran for the Maryland House of Delegates in District 20, seeking to succeed Heather Mizeur, who unsuccessfully ran for governor. During the Democratic primary, he received endorsements from several local labor unions, CASA de Maryland, and NARAL Pro-Choice Maryland. Jawando lost the Democratic primary on June 25, 2014, placing fourth with 15.1 percent of the vote, a margin of 400 votes out of 37,264 votes cast. Following his defeat, he joined Governor Martin O'Malley's political action committee, O' Say Can You See PAC, as a senior adviser.

=== 2016 U.S. House of Representatives campaign ===
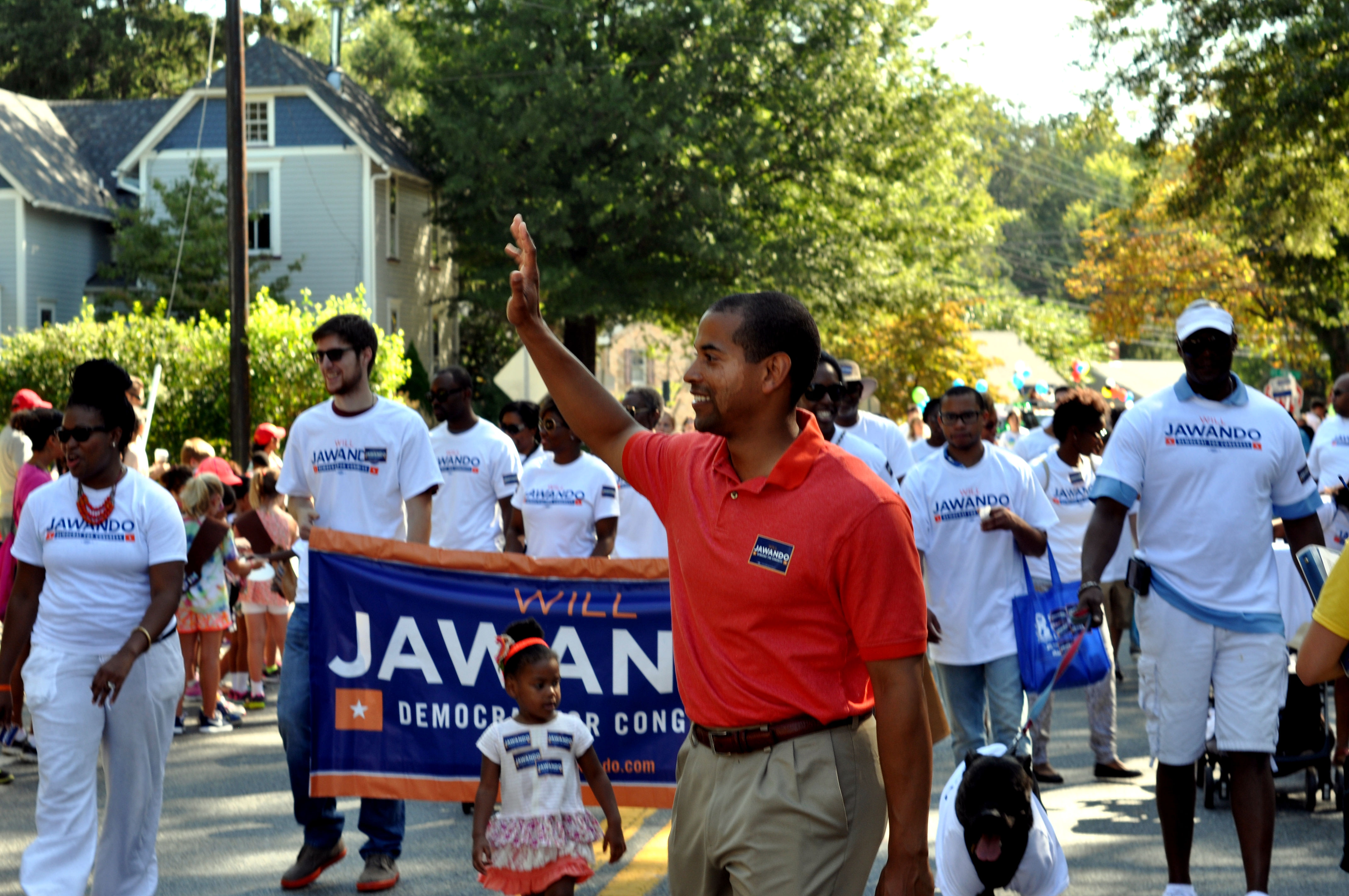
Jawando campaigning in Kensington, 2015

In April 2015, Jawando announced his candidacy for the United States House of Representatives in Maryland's 8th congressional district, seeking to succeed Chris Van Hollen, who ran for U.S. Senate. During the primary, he received endorsements from members of the Congressional Hispanic Caucus and Congressional Black Caucus, including U.S. Representatives John Lewis and Elijah Cummings, former U.S. education secretary Arne Duncan, and former United States Environmental Protection Agency administrator Lisa P. Jackson. He also ran on a platform of increasing the minimum wage, protecting abortion rights, paid sick and family leave, campaign finance reform, and police accountability.

In December 2015, The Washington Post reported that Jawando's campaign accepted donations from Martin Shkreli, who Jawando said he was introduced to by a friend in New York's financial sector. He promised to give away Shkreli's contributions to charity, however, campaign finance records show that Jawando's campaign had kept $22,900 in contributions from six other Turing Pharmaceuticals employees.

Jawando was defeated in the Democratic primary by state senator Jamie Raskin on April 27, 2016, placing fifth with 4.6 percent of the vote.

=== Montgomery County Council ===
In September 2017, Jawando announced his candidacy for the Montgomery County Council at-large. During his campaign, he utilized the county's public financing program. Jawando won the 34-way Democratic primary and later the general election, and was sworn in on December 3, 2018, becoming the second Black lawmaker elected countywide in Montgomery County. He was subsequently re-elected in 2022. During his tenure on the county council, Jawando supported efforts to increase education spending and bills to protect immigrants, impose rent stabilization controls, and prohibit U.S. Immigration and Customs Enforcement officers from wearing masks in Montgomery County.

In November 2022, Jawando joined the transition team of Governor-elect Wes Moore. He was a delegate to the 2024 Democratic National Convention, pledged to Kamala Harris.

In December 2024, Jawando was elected vice president of the Montgomery County Council. He opted not to seek the presidency in December 2025, opting instead to focus on his campaign for county executive in 2026.

In December 2023, Jawando started his own political action committee, Will of the People PAC, to support progressive candidates.

=== 2024 U.S. Senate campaign ===
On May 2, 2023, Jawando announced that he would run for United States Senate in 2024, seeking to succeed incumbent U.S. Senator Ben Cardin, who had announced the day before that he would not run for re-election in 2024. During the Democratic primary, he sought to position himself as a progressive, citing his record on the Montgomery County Council, and ran on a platform including Medicare for All, a federal universal basic income program, and universal preschool. He was viewed by the media as a long-shot candidate behind frontrunners Angela Alsobrooks and David Trone.

Jawando dropped out of the race on October 20, 2023, and endorsed Alsobrooks a few days later.

=== 2026 Montgomery County Executive campaign ===
On May 21, 2025, Jawando announced that he would run for Montgomery County Executive in 2026, seeking to succeed term-limited incumbent Marc Elrich. During the Democratic primary, he received endorsements from Elrich, Maryland governor Wes Moore, and U.S. senator Angela Alsobrooks, and was described as a frontrunner alongside county councilmembers Andrew Friedson and Evan Glass. Jawando also supported increased funding for the county's life sciences industry and public schools, deregulation for small businesses, and rent stabilization alongside increased housing development.

In June 2026, the Maryland State Board of Elections opened an investigation into Jawando's campaign after receiving an anonymous complaint alleging that he violated state campaign finance laws by coordinating with the Working Families Party, which spent nearly $88,000 on efforts to support Jawando's campaign after his U.S. Senate campaign contributed $115,000 to the organization in early 2025. The Working Families Party and Jawando's campaign denied the allegations, saying that there "has been no coordination of any kind with WFP's independent expenditure in this race". The Maryland State Board of Elections cleared Jawando of alleged wrongdoing later that month, saying that it was not able to identify "sufficient evidence to establish coordination ... or any other violation of Maryland campaign finance law".

Jawando won the Democratic primary election on June 23, 2026, and easily defeated Republican nominee Esther Wells in the general election on November 3, 2026.

== Political positions ==
Jawando has been described by media outlets as a progressive, including by himself.

=== COVID-19 pandemic ===
In April 2020, Jawando introduced the COVID-19 Renter Relief Act, a bill that prohibits landlords from increasing rent during and within 30 days after a public health emergency. He later partnered with local businessman David Blair to establish the Montgomery County Food Security fund to support those struggling financially during the COVID-19 pandemic.

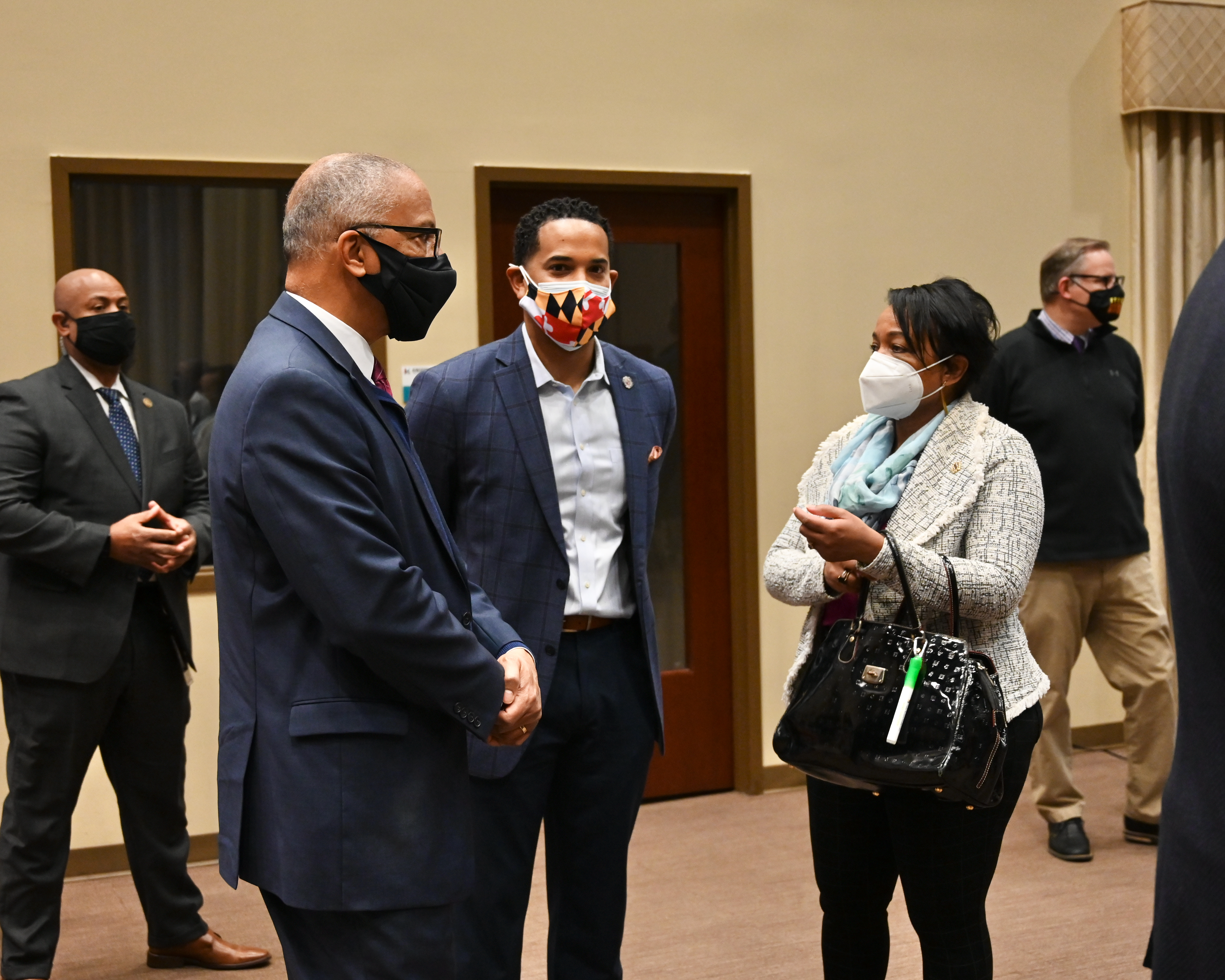
Jawando (center) touring the Kingdom Fellowship A.M.E. vaccination site with Lieutenant Governor Boyd Rutherford, 2021

In March 2021, Jawando co-signed a letter written by the Montgomery County Council to Governor Larry Hogan criticizing his administration's vaccine rollout, which they charged as disproportionally impacting people of color and low-wage residents of the state. In September 2021, he said he supported a proposal by Elrich to instate a vaccine mandate for county workers.

In October 2021, Jawando joined CASA de Maryland advocates at a protest at the Maryland State House, where he called on Hogan to reinstate eviction protections and on legislative leaders to form a special session to pass tenant protections bills. In August 2022, he supported a proposal by County Executive Marc Elrich to extend the COVID-19 Renter Relief Act by an additional six months and to limit rent increases at 4.4%.

=== Crime and policing ===
During the George Floyd protests, Jawando expressed support for the defund the police movement, but ultimately clarified and said he does not support defunding the police. He supported several bills as county councilmember to increase police oversight and reduce police brutality.

In January 2019, Jawando introduced the Law Enforcement Trust and Transparency Act, a bill that would require the State Prosecutor's Office or the United States Department of Justice to investigate officer-involved deaths. The bill passed and went into effect in 2020. In December 2021, he criticized a proposal by County Executive Marc Elrich to establish a police accountability board, saying it "falls short as introduced and the kind of public buy-in that's needed".

In May 2019, after released police body-camera footage showed a white officer using the N-word, Jawando called on Montgomery County Assistant Police Chief Marcus Jones to open an investigation into the incident. In June 2019, he introduced a bill to establish a Policing Advisory Commission to involve citizens in the county police department policy formulation.

In July 2020, Jawando introduced a bill to limit a police officer's use-of-force, which included restrictions on no-knock warrants and a ban on neck restraints. The bill was unanimously passed by the Montgomery County Council.

In July 2020, Jawando voted to reassign 12 of the 23 active school resource officers (SROs) in Montgomery County Public Schools. In November 2020, Jawando introduced a bill to remove SROs from Montgomery County Public Schools, instead redirecting the money toward mental health programs and restorative justice programs in the county. During the 2021 legislative session, he supported a state bill to replace SROs with counselors. In April 2021, Jawando and the Montgomery County Public Schools system launched the Student Wellbeing Action Group (SWAG), a workgroup to determine what supports students needed without SROs present.

In May 2021, Jawando introduced a bill that would require police officers to complete a 30-hour training course on racial equity and conflict resolution. The bill passed and was signed into law by Elrich in November 2022.

During the 2026 legislative session, Jawando testified in support of a bill that would prohibit law enforcement officers from wearing face coverings while on duty.

=== Fiscal issues ===
In October 2021, Jawando led efforts to launch a Guaranteed Income Pilot Program in Montgomery County, which would give $800 per month to 300 targeted families for two years.

In September 2023, Jawando introduced a bill to incrementally phase out the county's tipped wage, which he called a "legacy of slavery", by 2028. He withdrew the bill in January 2024, saying that he would instead push for a similar statewide bill.

=== Housing ===
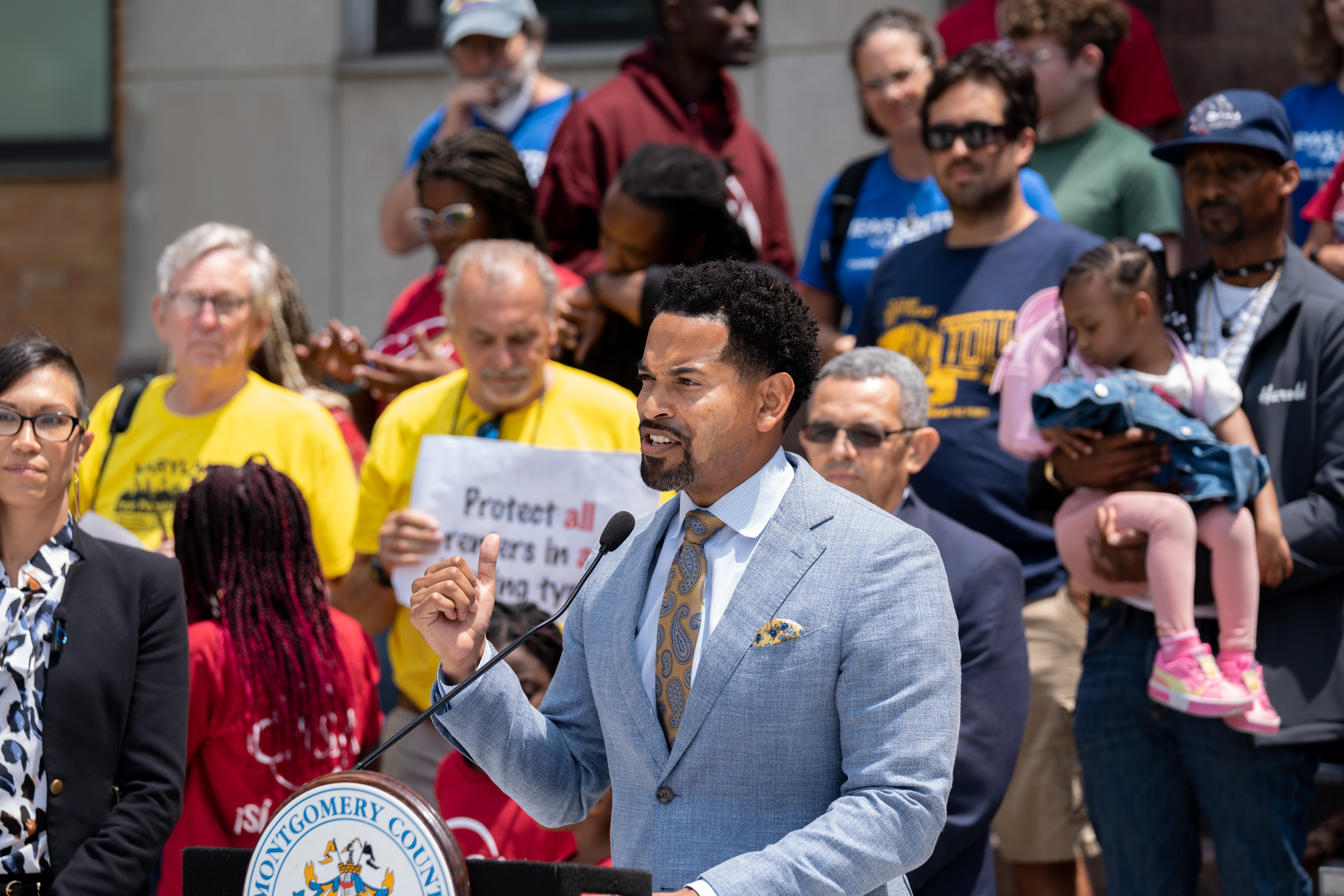
Jawando speaks at a rally supporting rent stabilization and anti-rent gouging protections, 2023

In October 2020, Jawando voted against a bill to give tax breaks to high-rise developers near Washington Metro stations. He later voted to sustain County Executive Marc Elrich's veto of the bill in December 2020. In February 2021, Jawando introduced a bill to allow development of multi-family housing within one mile of Metro stations and lower parking requirements for residences within half a mile, and another to limit rent increases to once a year.

During the 2022 legislative session, Jawando testified in support of a bill that would require landlords to have a "just cause" for choosing not to renew a tenant's lease.

In July 2022, Jawando introduced a bill that would establish an all-electric building standard in construction by 2024.

In July 2023, Jawando introduced a bill to cap annual rent increases in Montgomery County at six percent. The bill passed and was signed into law by County Executive Marc Elrich.

In January 2025, Jawando called for a "pause" on proposals to rezone single-family home lots to allow for multi-family housing, and in July 2025 voted against a bill to allow for multi-family housing near major roads.

=== National politics ===
In December 2019, Jawando participated in and spoke at a rally in Olney, Maryland to support of the first impeachment of Donald Trump.

=== Social issues ===
In October 2019, Jawando introduced the CROWN Act, a bill that would ban discrimination based on natural hairstyles. The bill passed and became law, making Montgomery County the first county in the United States to ban hairstyle discrimination.

In May 2022, following the leak of a draft opinion of the U.S. Supreme Court's ruling in Dobbs v. Jackson Women's Health Organization, Jawando predicted that Maryland would become "an important part of the nationwide care collection".

In September 2023, Jawando voted for a bill to ban the sale and use of gas-powered leaf blowers.

=== Taxes ===
In May 2019, Jawando said he supported expanding the county's property tax credit for owner-occupied residences.

During the 2020 legislative session, Jawando testified in support of a bill that would allow counties to implement a progressive income tax. He also proposed a bill to suspend the county's carryout bag tax during the COVID-19 pandemic; the bill was withdrawn in April 2020, after he spoke with representatives from local labor unions and environmental groups.

In June 2020, Jawando introduced a resolution to declare racism a public health crisis. The Montgomery County Council unanimously voted for the resolution.

In April 2023, Jawando introduced a bill to increase the county recordation tax by over a dollar for each $500 of the sales price.

=== Transportation ===
Jawando opposed Governor Larry Hogan's plan to widen Interstate 270 and the Capital Beltway, saying in December 2019 that the plans would "do nothing to reduce miles travelled or tailpipe emissions" and that its express toll lanes would "only be available to the wealthiest residents".

== Personal life ==
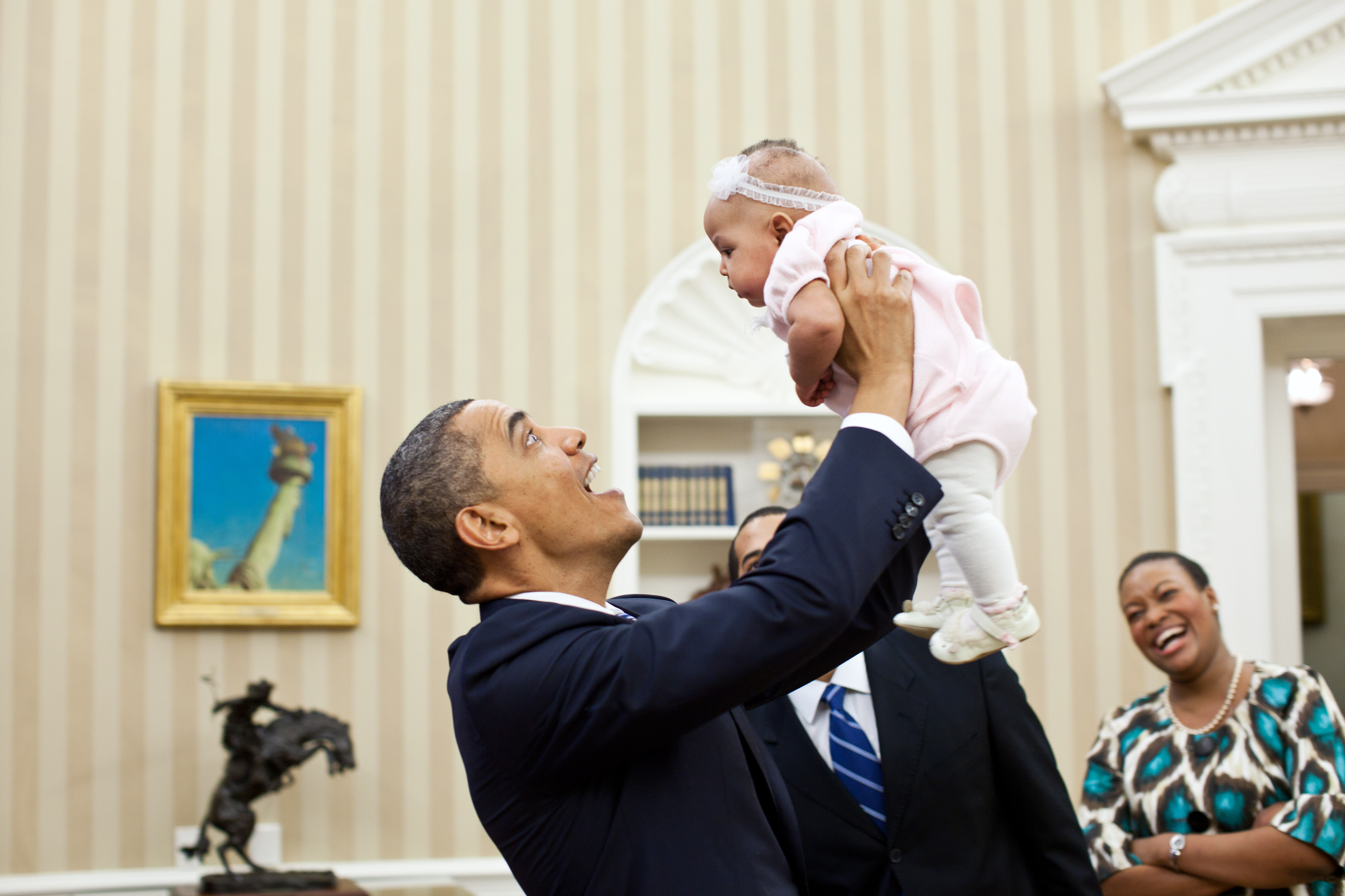
President Barack Obama holds up Jawando's four-month old child, 2011

Jawando met his future wife, Michele Lawrence, in 2004 at the Chi-Cha Lounge in Washington, D.C. They were engaged nine months later. As of January 2023, Michele is senior vice president for programs of the Omidyar Network. Together, they have four children and live in Sandy Spring, Maryland.

Outside of politics, Jawando is a choir singer at the Reid Temple A.M.E. Church in Silver Spring.

In November 2021, Jawando missed a court hearing he had requested to contest two traffic citations. Jawando's chief of staff stated that he paid the fines before his license was to be suspended in response to the absence.

On September 7, 2026, Jawando was hospitalized at George Washington University Hospital after suffering a heart attack during a basketball game, during which doctors successfully placed a stent. He made his in-person return to the Montgomery County Council on September 29.

== Electoral history ==
Maryland House of Delegates District 20 Democratic primary election, 2014
Party	Candidate	Votes	%
Democratic	Sheila E. Hixson (incumbent)	9,135	24.5
Democratic	David Moon	6,959	18.7
Democratic	William C. Smith Jr.	6,006	16.1
Democratic	Will Jawando	5,620	15.1
Democratic	Darian Unger	4,296	11.5
Democratic	Jonathan Shurberg	2,997	8.0
Democratic	Justin W. Chappell	1,076	2.9
Democratic	D'Juan Hopewell	778	2.1
Democratic	George Zokle	397	1.1

Maryland's 8th congressional district Democratic primary election, 2016
Party	Candidate	Votes	%
Democratic	Jamie Raskin	43,776	33.6
Democratic	David Trone	35,400	27.1
Democratic	Kathleen Matthews	31,186	23.9
Democratic	Ana Sol Gutierrez	7,185	5.5
Democratic	William Jawando	6,058	4.6
Democratic	Kumar P. Barve	3,149	2.4
Democratic	David M. Anderson	1,511	1.2
Democratic	Joel Martin Rubin	1,426	1.1
Democratic	Dan Bolling	712	0.5

Montgomery County Council At-Large Democratic primary election, 2018
Party	Candidate	Votes	%
Democratic	Hans Riemer (incumbent)	54,584	12.2
Democratic	Will Jawando	43,154	9.6
Democratic	Evan Glass	35,600	8.0
Democratic	Gabe Albornoz	33,050	7.4
Democratic	Marilyn Balcombe	28,067	6.3
Democratic	Chris Wilhelm	26,453	5.9
Democratic	Brandy H. M. Brooks	26,214	5.9
Democratic	Ashwani Jain	19,367	4.3
Democratic	Hoan Dang	16,911	3.8
Democratic	Bill Conway	14,815	3.3
Democratic	Danielle Meitiv	14,808	3.3
Democratic	Jill Ortman Fouse	14,704	3.3
Democratic	Charles E. Barkley	10,468	2.3
Democratic	Loretta Jean Garcia	10,280	2.3
Democratic	Shruti Bhatnagar	9,390	2.1
Democratic	Cherri L. Branson	9,263	2.1
Democratic	Mohammad Siddique	9,060	2.0
Democratic	Melissa McKenna	8,035	1.8
Democratic	Seth Grimes	6,716	1.5
Democratic	Graciela Rivera-Oven	6,682	1.5
Democratic	Rosemary O. Arkoian	6,578	1.5
Democratic	Lorna Phillips Forde	6,436	1.4
Democratic	Michele Riley	6,216	1.4
Democratic	Steve Solomon	5,666	1.3
Democratic	Neil H. Greenberger	5,607	1.3
Democratic	Paul S. Geller	3,854	0.9
Democratic	Richard Gottfried	3,035	0.7
Democratic	David V. Lipscomb	2,464	0.6
Democratic	Jarrett Smith	2,390	0.5
Democratic	Darwin Romero	2,300	0.5
Democratic	Tom R. Falcinelli, Jr.	2,207	0.5
Democratic	Ron Colbert	1,675	0.4
Democratic	Craig Carozza-Caviness	1,589	0.4

Montgomery County Council At-Large election, 2018
Party	Candidate	Votes	%
Democratic	Evan Glass	276,908	19.3
Democratic	Gabe Albornoz	270,904	18.9
Democratic	Will Jawando	268,131	18.7
Democratic	Hans Riemer (incumbent)	262,682	18.3
Republican	Robert Dyer	87,971	6.1
Republican	Shelly Skolnick	81,181	5.7
Republican	Penny Musser	79,012	5.5
Republican	Chris P. Fiotes, Jr.	76,227	5.3
Green	Tim Willard	30,461	2.1
Write-in		1,254	0.1

Montgomery County Council At-Large election, 2022
Party	Candidate	Votes	%
Democratic	Evan Glass (incumbent)	238,001	20.2
Democratic	Laurie-Anne Sayles	235,186	19.9
Democratic	Gabe Albornoz (incumbent)	232,561	19.7
Democratic	Will Jawando (incumbent)	229,826	19.5
Republican	Dwight Patel	71,182	6.0
Republican	Christopher Fiotes	70,575	6.0
Republican	Lenard Lieber	66,798	5.7
Green	Dan Robinson	33,355	2.8
Write-in		1,254	0.1
