= Marc Elrich =

American politician (born 1949)

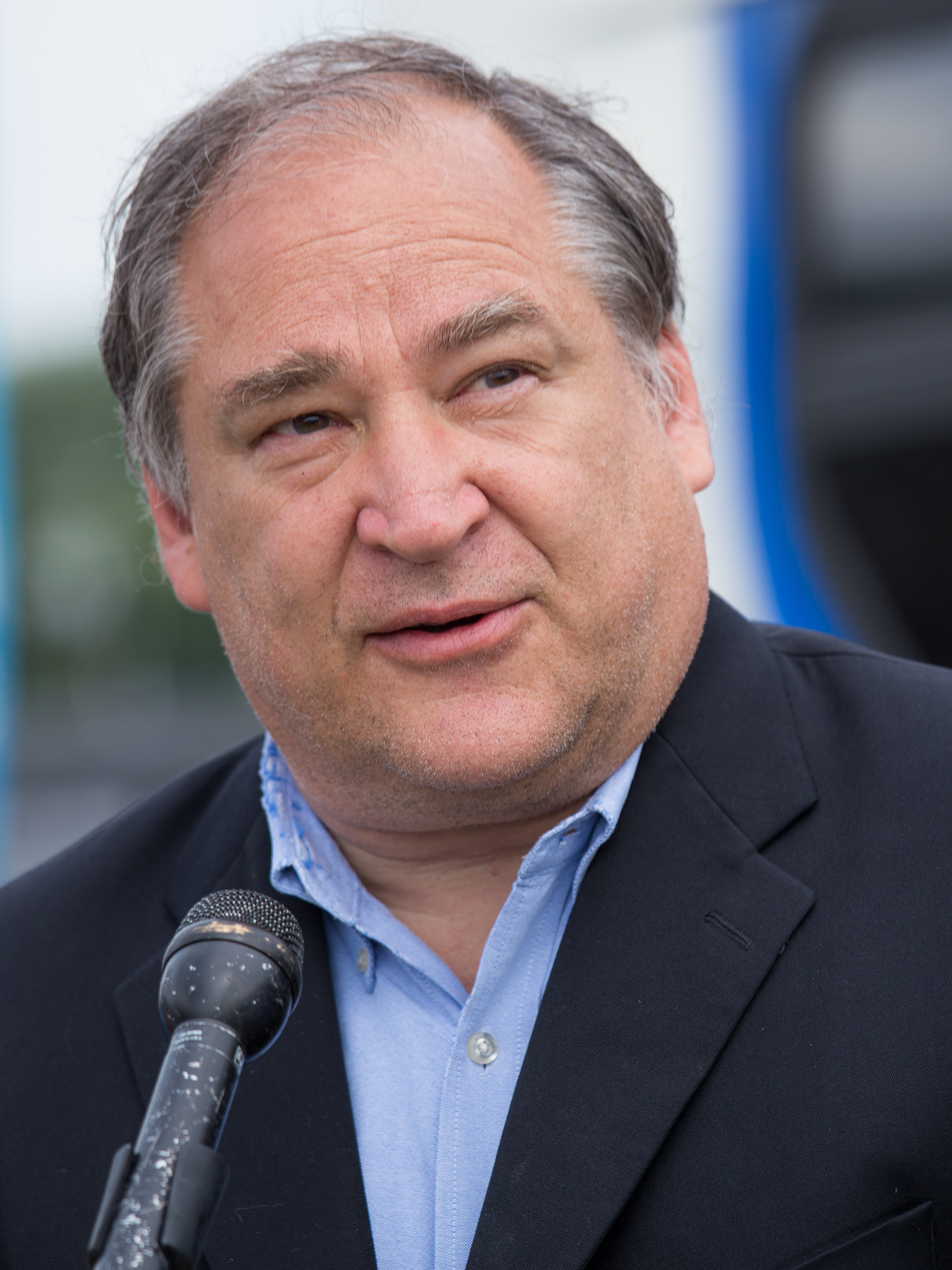
- Elrich in 2014

7th Executive of Montgomery County
- Incumbent
- Assumed office December 3, 2018
- Preceded by: Ike Leggett

Member of the Montgomery County Council from the at-large district
- Assuming office December 7, 2026
- Succeeding: Shebra Evans; Evan Glass; Will Jawando
- In office December 4, 2006 – December 3, 2018
- Preceded by: Steven Silverman; Michael Subin
- Succeeded by: Gabe Albornoz; Evan Glass; Will Jawando

Personal details
- Born: November 2, 1949 (age 77) Washington, D.C., U.S.
- Party: Democratic
- Other political affiliations: Democratic Socialists of America
- Children: 4
- Education: University of Maryland, College Park (BA); Johns Hopkins University (MA)

Marc B. Elrich (born November 2, 1949) is an American politician who is an at-large member-elect of the Montgomery County Council. A member of the Democratic Party and the Democratic Socialists of America, he has served as the county executive of Montgomery County, Maryland, since 2018, and previously served as an at-large member of the Montgomery County Council from 2006 to 2018.

Born in Washington, D.C., and raised in Silver Spring, Maryland, Elrich graduated from the University of Maryland, College Park and Johns Hopkins University, afterwards working as a teacher at Rolling Terrance Elementary School for 17 years. He served as a member of the Takoma Park City Council from 1987 to 2006, afterwards serving on the Montgomery County Council from 2006 to 2018. Elrich was first elected as Montgomery County Executive in 2018 and reelected in 2022. During his tenure, Elrich opposed efforts to build more affordable housing in Montgomery County.

In 2026, after voters approved a referendum limiting county executives to two consecutive terms, Elrich was elected to serve as an at-large member the Montgomery County Council.

== Early life and career ==
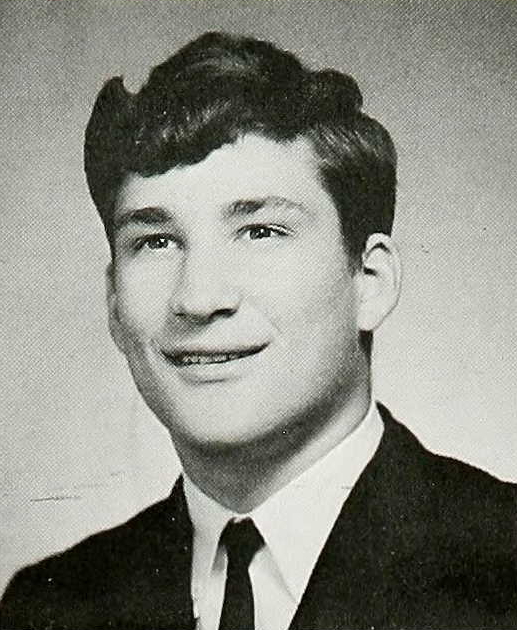
Elrich in the Albert Einstein High School yearbook, 1967

Marc Elrich was born in Washington, D.C., near Takoma Park. His father was a postal worker and his mother was a waitress. When he was ten, his family moved to Silver Spring. In 1963, he went to hear Martin Luther King Jr. speak at the March on Washington. He attended Albert Einstein High School in Kensington and the University of Maryland, where he was a member of the Students for a Democratic Society. He worked as a manager in the automotive department at Montgomery Ward before getting a master's degree in teaching from Johns Hopkins University.

Elrich taught 4th and 5th grade for 17 years at Rolling Terrace Elementary. He served on the Takoma Park City Council from 1987 to 2006. Early in his career he was arrested at an anti-apartheid rally.

Elrich is a member of the Democratic Socialists of America, and has identified as socialist since he attended college.

== Political career ==
=== Montgomery County Council ===
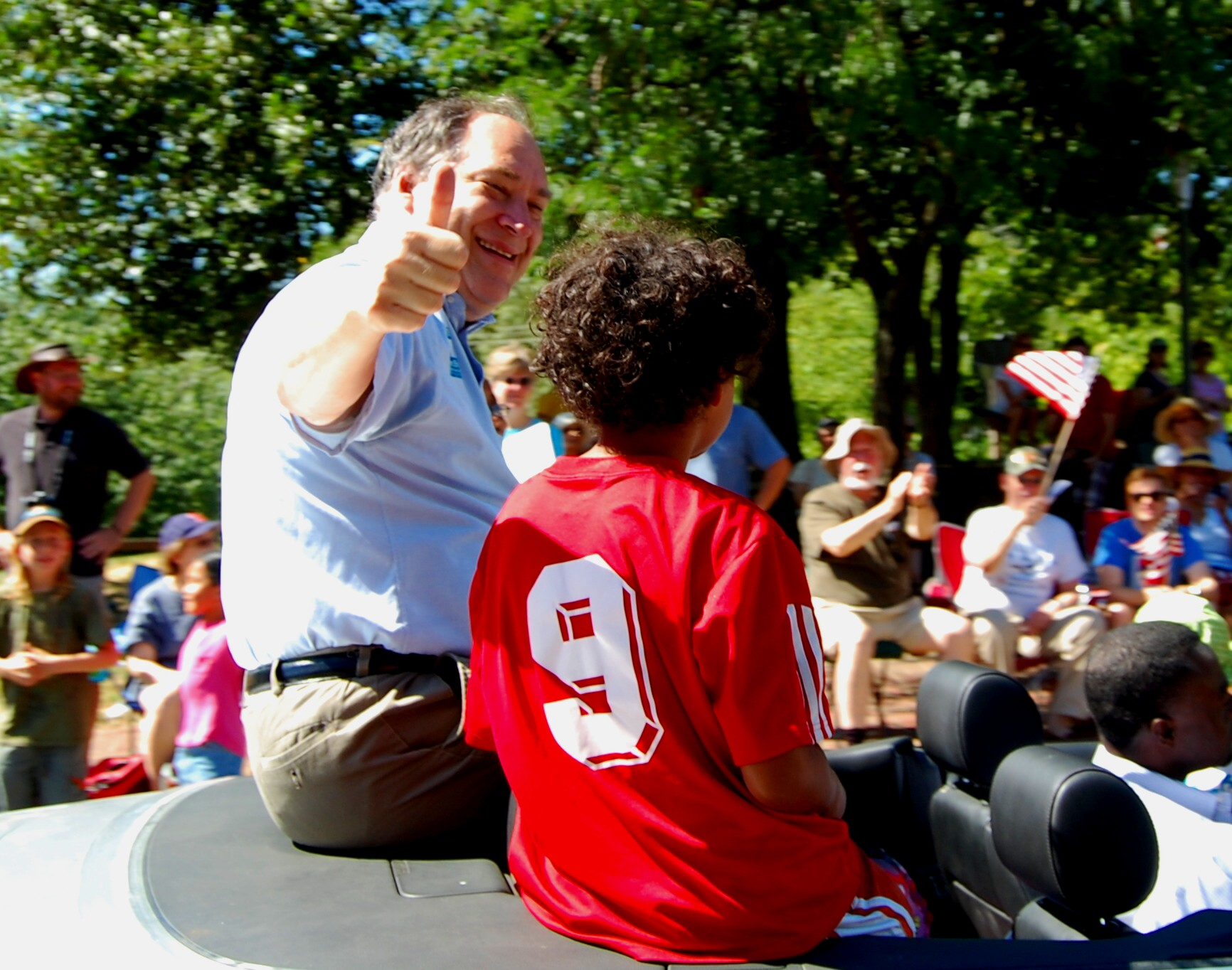
Elrich at a Fourth of July event, 2010

Elrich ran for the county council four times before getting elected in 2006. Since that time, he has served three terms. He was elected with the most votes of any candidate in 2010 and 2014. The Washington Post endorsed his candidacy in 2010 and 2014, stating that he was viewed as somewhat anti-business, but advocated a business-beneficial transit system and had a strong focus on efficiency and the development and planning process.

He worked to have environmental concerns addressed in the Clarksburg Master Plan and he spearheaded the effort to protect Tenmile Creek. The amendment that was passed requires development to supply environmental protections. He considered protecting the stream one of his highest environmental concerns at the time. He supported one bill protecting the tree canopy and sponsored another protecting street trees. Both were voted into law. He advocated for the elimination of cosmetic use of pesticides on private lawns because of their cancer-causing chemicals helping the county become the first locality in the country to do so and was considered a key co-sponsor of the legislation. He advocated against the use of artificial playing turfs that contain lead and other cancer-causing ingredients and sponsored a resolution banning crumb rubber turfs. He voted for the Montgomery county five-cent bag tax to fund environmental cleanup efforts. He was lead sponsor of a bill to require large gas stations to be at least 500 feet (150 m) from schools and parks.

In 2013, Elrich was the lead sponsor of legislation to increase the county's minimum wage, which raised it to $11.50 per hour. Elrich twice was the lead sponsor of legislation to increase the minimum wage to $15 per hour in Montgomery County. In January 2017, a bill passed in the Council and was vetoed by then County Executive Ike Legget. In November 2017, a second bill passed and was signed into law, making Montgomery County the first county in Maryland with a $15 per hour minimum wage. At the time of the bill's passage, the State of Maryland's minimum wage was $9.25 per hour.

=== Montgomery County Executive ===
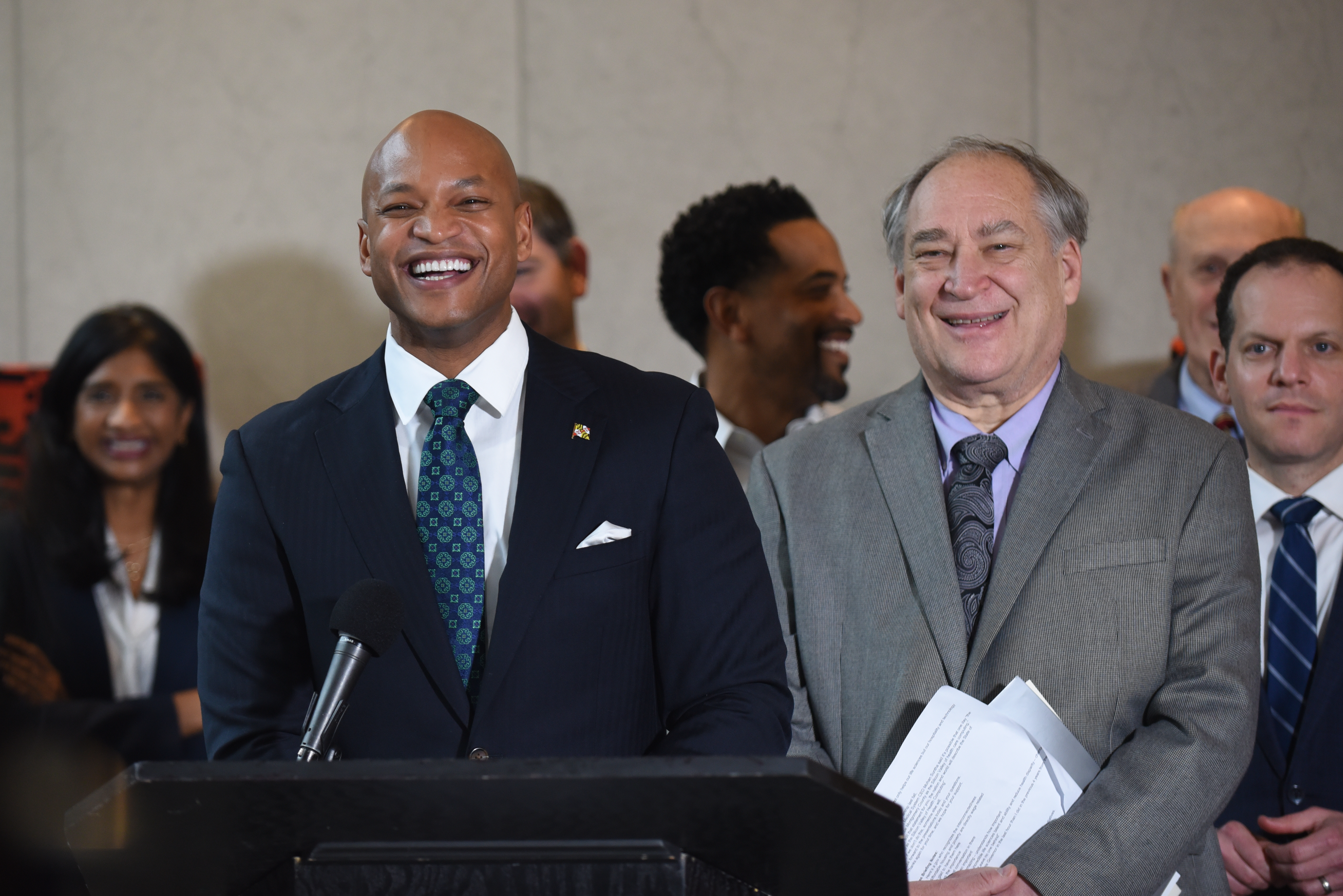
Elrich with Maryland Governor Wes Moore at the Montgomery County UM3 conference in North Bethesda, February 17, 2023

In 2017, Elrich declared his candidacy for county executive. He participated in public financing. The largest allowed contribution is $150. He did not accept money from developers or land use attorneys.

In 2019, Elrich banned Montgomery County police stations from displaying thin blue line flags. Acknowledging that the flag was a symbol of "support" to some and a symbol of "divisiveness" to others, he drew criticism from Governor Larry Hogan for the policy.

In 2019, The Washington Post editorial board called Elrich's decision to block construction of communication towers in Montgomery County a "victory for NIMBYism."

==== Positions on housing and development ====
In 2013, Elrich was the lone vote to oppose a plan to preserve affordable housing along the Purple Line light rail corridor. In 2017, Elrich was criticized for describing the council's plan to allow denser housing construction around the stations of the planned 16-mile (26 km) Purple Line as "ethnic cleansing". He said he was sorry if his language was offensive, but he defended his comment saying that this is not just a Montgomery County problem but a nationwide problem and a "well-known fact" of what happens when rail lines take over communities.

During his tenure, Elrich has said he has tried to preserve affordable housing. Elrich has opposed market-rate housing construction, and higher density near public transit stations. He has opposed allowing duplexes, fourplexes and sixplexes in some neighborhoods that are exclusively zoned for single-family housing. In 2019, Elrich opposed a nonbinding council resolution to build 10,000 more housing units (most of them affordable housing) by 2030, saying that the county cannot afford to build that much affordable housing. He has cast doubt on projections by the Metropolitan Washington Council of Governments on the need for more middle-income and low-income housing. In 2019, Elrich said that he rejected the concept of missing middle housing, and said that Montgomery County did not lack housing for middle earners.

In 2019, he opposed a zoning change that allowed homeowners on single-family zoning plots to build accessory dwelling units, saying that it would "fundamentally alter" neighborhood character and not lead to more affordable housing – the zoning change was approved unanimously by the council. In 2019, he said he would prevent tearing down affordable housing to "build housing for millennials." In 2020, Elrich vetoed a bill giving tax breaks to developers who built high-rise buildings on top of Metro stations, but the council overrode his veto. Elrich has frequently called for higher taxes on real estate developers.

Housing activists have characterized Elrich as a NIMBY.

Elrich voted against the White Flint Mall II sector plan because Elrich stated that the plan would have created 6,000 residential units located too far from a Metro station. He voted against the Bethesda Master Plan because it failed to consider the effect the increased density would have on roads and schools. He voted against the Lyttonsville Sector Plan because he stated that it would increase housing costs and force residents to move out, as well as the Chevy Chase Lake Sector Plan. He opposed a proposal to sell land adjacent to the White Oak Food and Drug Administration campus because local roads and infrastructure were not equipped to handle additional traffic and students. In 1995, he joined with community members and fought against a proposed mega mall in downtown Silver Spring.

In June 2026, Elrich released an executive order to place a six-month moratorium on data center permits.

=== 2026 Montgomery County Council election ===
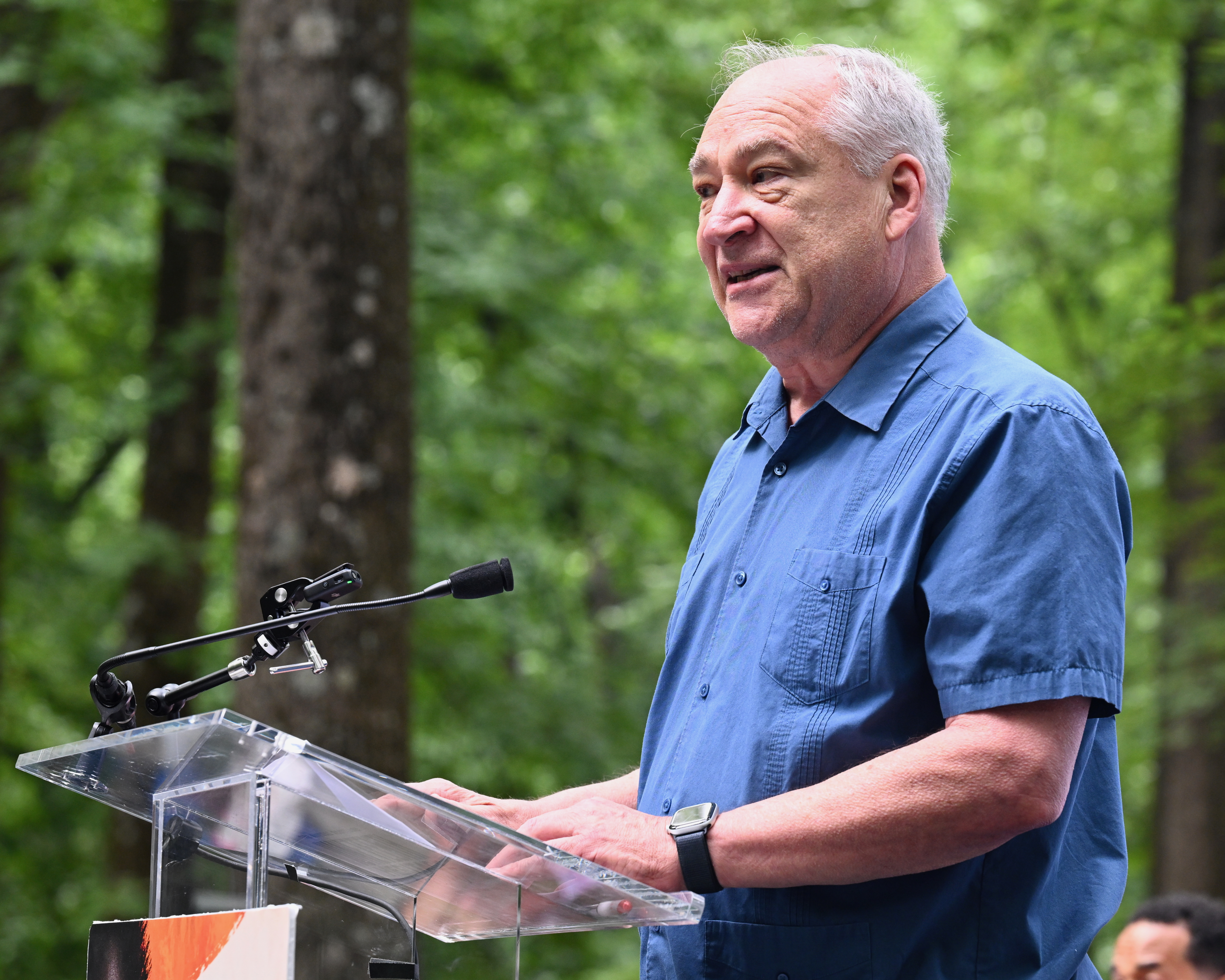
Elrich speaks at the annual Scotland Juneteenth Heritage Festival, 2026

During the 2024 elections, Montgomery County voters approved a referendum backed by the Montgomery County Republican Party to limit the county executive to two consecutive terms, blocking Elrich from running for a third term. On November 18, 2024, Elrich announced that he would run for an at-large seat on the Montgomery County Council in 2026.

== Personal life ==
Elrich has four children. Two were foster children, including a son who has Down syndrome. He has lived in Takoma Park for most of his life. He is Jewish.

== 2018 elections ==
=== Primary election results ===
The Democratic primary election was held on June 26, 2018.

Democratic primary results
Party	Candidate	Votes	%
Democratic	Marc Elrich	37,532	29.02
Democratic	David Blair	37,455	28.96
Democratic	Rose Krasnow	19,644	15.19
Democratic	Roger Berliner	16,710	12.92
Democratic	George L. Levanthal	13,318	10.30
Democratic	Bill Frick	4,687	3.62
Majority		77	0.06
Total votes		129,346	100.00

=== General election results ===
The general election was held on November 6, 2018.

Montgomery County Executive election, 2018
Party	Candidate	Votes	%
Democratic	Marc Elrich	225,900	64.3%
Independent	Nancy Floreen	67,402	19.2%
Republican	Robin Ficker	57,489	16.4%
Write-ins		356	0.1%
Majority		158,498	45.1%
Total votes		351,150	100.0%

== 2022 elections ==
=== Primary election results ===
The Montgomery County executive primary election was held on July 19, 2022. On August 6, Elrich declared victory with a 42 vote lead over Blair, but Blair released a statement saying he would request a recount pursuant to Maryland law. Elrich ended up winning the recount by 32 votes.

Democratic primary results
Party	Candidate	Votes	%
Democratic	Marc Elrich	55,504	39.20
Democratic	David Blair	55,472	39.18
Democratic	Hans Riemer	28,193	19.91
Democratic	Peter James	2,429	1.72
Total votes		141,598	100.00

=== General election results ===
The general election was held on Tuesday, November 8, 2022. Elrich defeated Montgomery County GOP chairman Reardon Sullivan.

Montgomery County Executive election, 2022
Party	Candidate	Votes	%	±%
Democratic	Marc Elrich (incumbent)	251,897	75.11%	+10.37
Republican	Reardon Sullivan	81,410	24.27%	+8.06
Write-in		2,083	0.62%	+0.52
Total votes		335,390	100.00%	
Democratic hold				
