= Agbegnigan Amouzou =

Soccer coach and former player

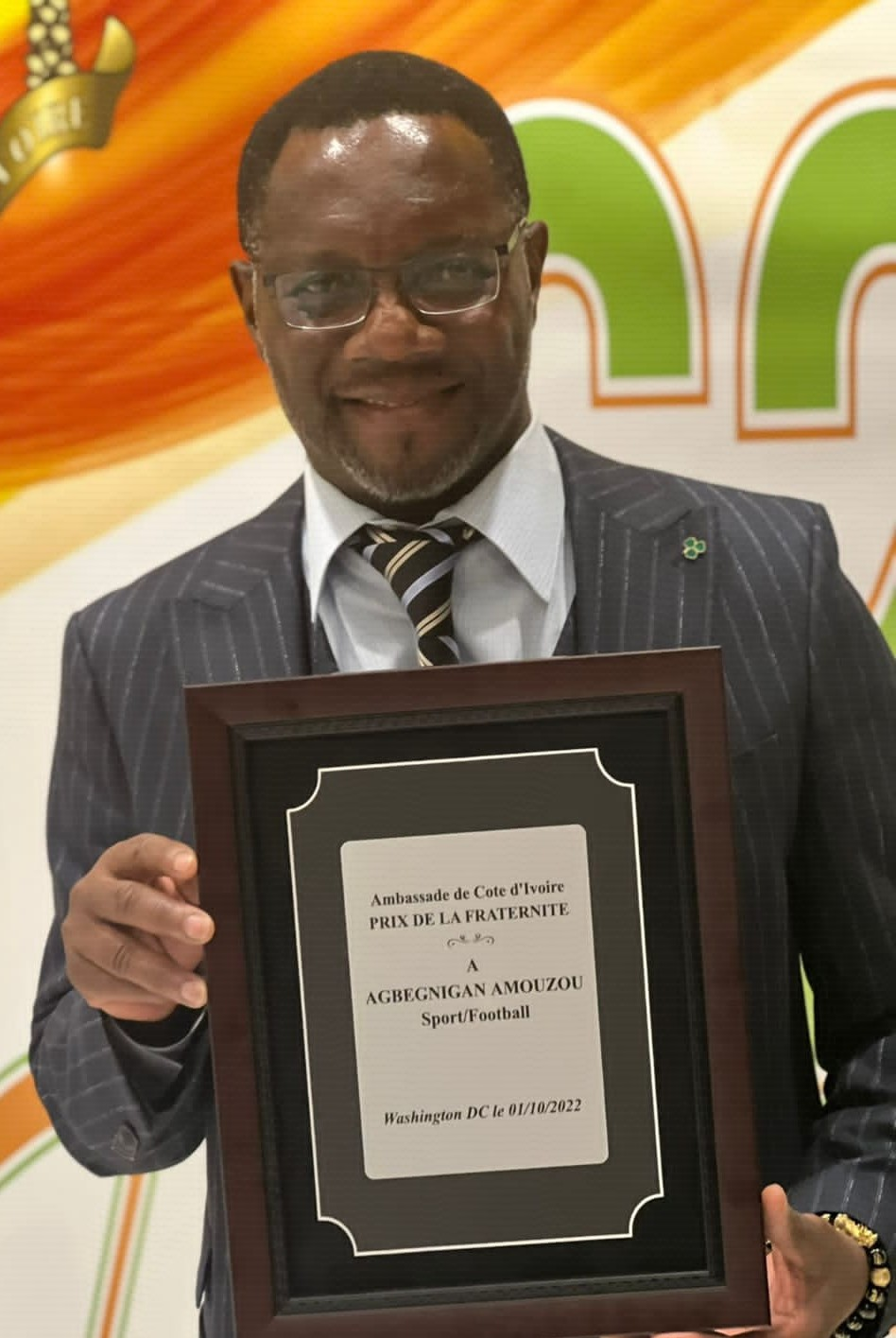
- Agbegnigan at an award ceremony in the U.S (2022).

Personal information
- Full name: Agbegnigan Amouzou
- Date of birth: 20 May 1967 (age 59)
- Place of birth: Lomé, Togo

Team information
- Current team: ESYDA (coach)

Agbegnigan Amouzou (born 20 May 1967), also known as "Coach Fofo", is a former professional soccer player from Togo. He began his soccer career in his home country Togo and represented the Togolese national team in the 1986 World Cup. His playing career ended in France in 1998. Transitioning from his successful playing days, Coach Fofo has continued to work as a youth soccer coach.

== Coaching career ==
After retiring from professional soccer, Agbegnigan Amouzou transitioned into coaching. In 2002, he moved to the United States, where he obtained various coaching certifications and started making a significant impact on the local soccer scene. He founded the Elite Soccer Youth Development Academy (ESYDA) in Maryland, a non-profit organization dedicated to youth development through soccer. The academy focuses on teaching leadership, discipline, and educational success.

== Awards and recognitions ==
Coach Fofo has been recognized for his contributions to the community, both on and off the soccer field. He has been actively involved with numerous soccer clubs in the Maryland metropolitan area. His efforts have been acknowledged with awards such as the 2013 IMPACT Silver Spring Social Momentum Award and the 2022 Ivory Coast Embassy in the United States, and the Prix de la Fraternité (Sports/Football) for his impact as an African diaspora member. In November 2023, Agbegnigan Amouzou received a new recognition in Maryland from Montgomery County Executive, Marc Elrich.
