= Steve Silverman =

Steve Silverman may refer to:

- Steven Silverman (born 1954), lawyer, Director of the Montgomery County, MD Department of Economic Development, 2009-2014
- Stephen M. Silverman (born 1951), entertainment journalist and nonfiction writer
