= Ike Leggett =

American politician

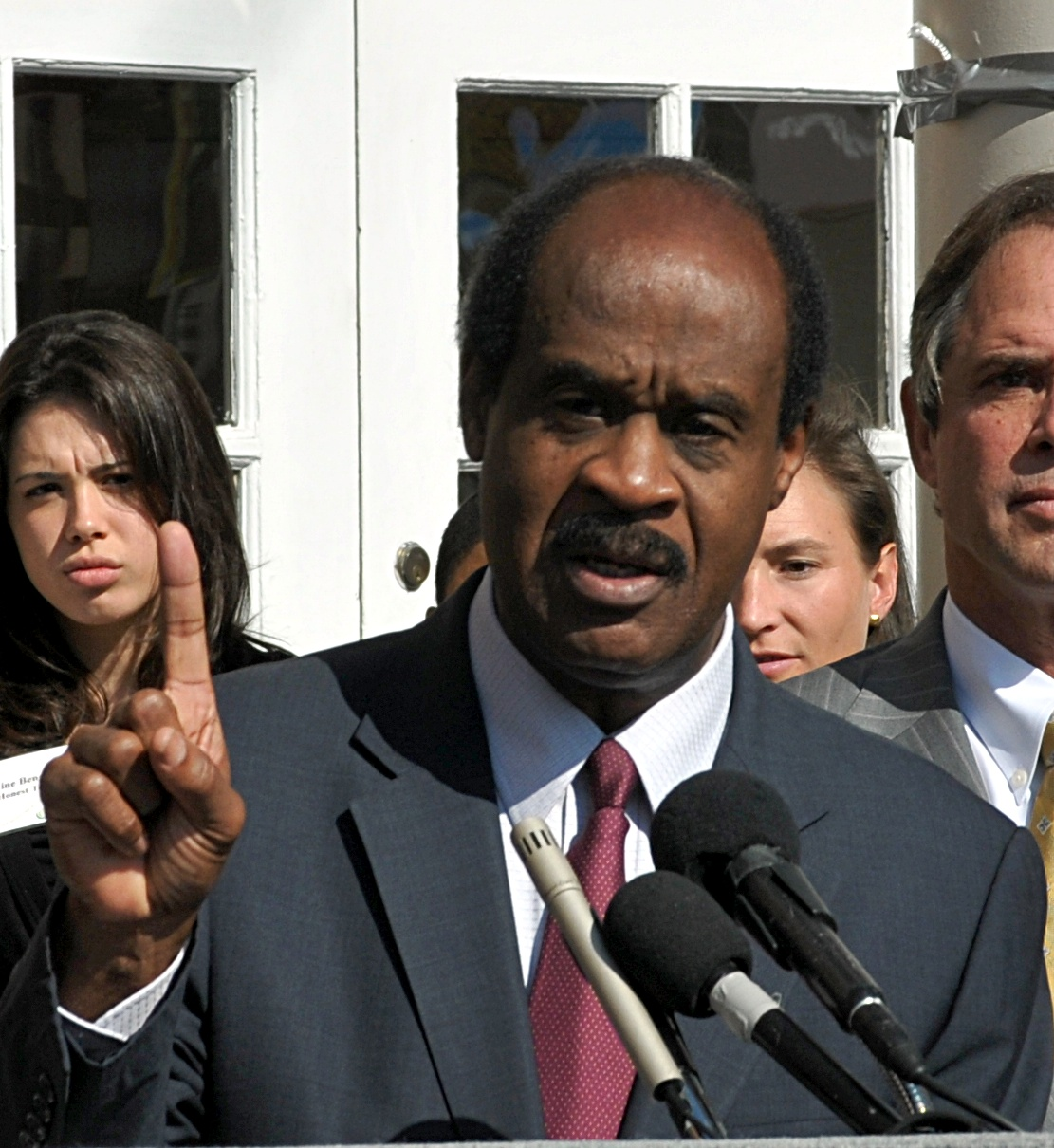
- Leggett at a ribbon cutting ceremony in October 2009

6th Montgomery County Executive
- In office December 4, 2006 – December 3, 2018
- Preceded by: Doug Duncan
- Succeeded by: Marc Elrich

Chair of the Maryland Democratic Party
- In office 2002–2004
- Preceded by: Terry Lierman
- Succeeded by: Wayne Rogers

Member of the Montgomery County Council from the at-large district
- In office 1986–2002

Personal details
- Born: Isiah Leggett; July 25, 1944 (age 82) Deweyville, Texas, U.S.
- Party: Democratic
- Spouse: Catherine
- Children: Yaminah
- Education: Southern University (BA); Howard University (MA, JD); George Washington University (L.M)
- Occupation: Lawyer, politician, law professor, public official
- Awards: Bronze Star Medal; Vietnam Service Medal; Vietnam Campaign Medal

Military service
- Allegiance: United States of America
- Branch/service: United States Army
- Years of service: 1967–1971
- Rank: Captain
- Battles/wars: Vietnam War
- Ike Leggett's voice Ike Leggett on the history of African Americans in Montgomery County politics Recorded February 18, 2022

Isiah "Ike" Leggett (born July 25, 1944) is an American politician from the U.S. state of Maryland and former executive of Montgomery County, Maryland. He is a member of the Democratic Party.

Born in Deweyville, Texas, Leggett attended Southern University in Baton Rouge, Louisiana, and, after serving in the Vietnam War with the U.S. Army, earned a J.D. degree from Howard University in Washington, D.C. In 1986, he became the first African-American elected to the county council in Montgomery County, Maryland, and served on the council through 2002.

For two years, Leggett served as the chairman of the Maryland Democratic Party before leaving that position to run for office once again. Leggett was elected county executive of Montgomery County in 2006, the first African-American to hold that office.

== Early life and education ==
Leggett was born on July 25, 1944, in Deweyville, Texas, and grew up with eleven siblings in Alexandria, Louisiana. In Alexandria, he played football for Peabody Magnet High School. He attended Southern University in Baton Rouge, working through school as a groundskeeper in a work-study program and graduating in 1967. In his time as an undergraduate, he was a student leader in the civil rights movement and twice met Martin Luther King Jr. He led the on-campus civil rights movement while at the same time commanding the Southern University Reserve Officers' Training Corps (ROTC) unit. He was elected president of his class during his senior year and is a member of Alpha Phi Alpha fraternity, the first intercollegiate fraternity established for African-Americans. In 1968, Leggett served as a captain in the United States Army during the Vietnam War, first in combat with a military advisory unit attached to the Army of the Republic of Vietnam and then as a public affairs officer with the 7th Support Battalion/199th Light Infantry Brigade. He was awarded the Bronze Star for Service. In 1974, he received Master of Arts and Juris Doctor degrees from Howard University in Washington, D.C., graduating first in his law school class, followed soon after by a Master of Laws degree from George Washington University. He returned to Howard as a professor in their law school in 1976 and continued teaching at the law school through his election as county executive in 2006, except for a stint as a White House Fellow under President Jimmy Carter in 1977.

== Career ==
Leggett's first participation in county government was as an appointed member of the Montgomery County Human Relations Committee, on which he served from 1979 to 1986. He was later named chair of the committee. In 1986, he was elected as an at-large member of the Montgomery County Council, becoming the first African-American ever to serve on the council. To this day, only one other African-American has been elected to county government office at large. He was re-elected to the seat three more times, and served three one-year terms as council president. During his time on the council, he chaired the council's transportation and environment committee and played a role in passage of a county living wage law and a public smoking ban. In 1992, a former county council aide of Leggett's accused him of sexual harassment in a widely publicized case, but the accusation was dismissed by a jury. In 2002, Leggett declined to run for re-election to the county council. He was widely viewed as a potential running mate for Democratic nominee Kathleen Kennedy Townsend in that year's gubernatorial race. However, Townsend chose Admiral Charles R. Larson instead. Townsend and Larson lost in November when Maryland elected Robert Ehrlich to be its first Republican governor in 40 years and Lieutenant Governor Michael S. Steele as its first African-American statewide elected official. When his term on the council was completed in December of that year, Leggett was elected as chairman of the Maryland Democratic Party. Leggett's chairmanship was seen by some Democratic activists as important to maintaining the African-American base of the Maryland Democratic Party and rebuilding the party's strength following the 2002 gubernatorial loss.

=== 2006 campaign for county executive ===
Following the election of 2004, Maryland politicians started announcing their intentions for the 2006 elections. Among them was three-term county executive Doug Duncan, who was in the early stages of a run for governor. In December 2004, Leggett left his position as chair of the Maryland Democratic Party to begin a campaign to replace Duncan as Montgomery County executive. In the Democratic primary election, Leggett squared off against a former colleague from the council, Steve Silverman. Leggett and Silverman engaged in a long series of debates beginning almost a year before the election. But despite being outspent by Silverman by more than five to one, Leggett won the Democratic nomination for executive by 61.3 percent to 35.5 percent in the primary election on September 12, 2006. He then faced Republican nominee Chuck Floyd and independent anti-tax advocate Robin Ficker in the general election. Leggett easily won the November election with 68 percent of the vote to Floyd's 22 percent and 10 percent for Ficker. He carried 239 of the county's 241 voting precincts.

=== First term as county executive ===
In the early days of his administration, Leggett took the lead on a number of controversial issues. To help alleviate transportation funding difficulties and move County transit projects forward, he proposed a statewide gas tax increase, a position he first articulated in his race for county executive. This proposal, which happened in the midst of a state budget crunch and in response to high levels of traffic congestion in the county, was supported by the county council but largely ignored by incoming governor Martin O'Malley. Leggett continued to advocate for the increase throughout his term.

Leggett dealt with the major local issue of a hiring site for day laborers from the city of Gaithersburg and the surrounding upper county area. During the term of Leggett's predecessor Doug Duncan, Gaithersburg had struggled to find space within the city limits that the county could lease for use as a location where the day laborers could wait for employers. The owners of virtually all of the more than 30 sites considered by the city government had refused to grant a lease for this purpose, and in the one case where the property owner was willing to consider the use, the county's efforts to lease the property fell through after the property owner backed out. The debate became caught up in a larger national debate about the role of illegal immigrants in American society. Leggett located a site for day laborer center on county-owned land with his first several months in office. Despite opposition from anti-immigrant voices, the center has served hundreds of workers and employers without incident.

=== Second term as county executive ===
Leggett was unopposed in the 2010 Democratic Party primary for county executive. In the general election, he was opposed by Republican Party candidate Douglas Rosenfeld. In the November balloting, Leggett won reelection with 66 percent of the vote to 34 percent for Rosenfeld, carrying 227 of the county's 252 precincts.

=== Third term as county executive ===
Leggett won the Democratic nomination for a third term, gaining 45 percent of the vote to 33 percent for former county executive Doug Duncan and 22 percent for councilmember Phil Andrews, and winning 80 percent of county precincts. In the fall general election Leggett defeated the Republican candidate James Shalleck by 65-35 percent, winning 212 of 245 voting precincts. Leggett declared before the passage of term limits in the county in 2016, that he would not run for re-election.

Leggett was elected as president of the Maryland Association of Counties in January 2015. In January 2017, he vetoed a bill which would have gradually raised the county minimum wage to $15 an hour by 2020.

== Personal life ==
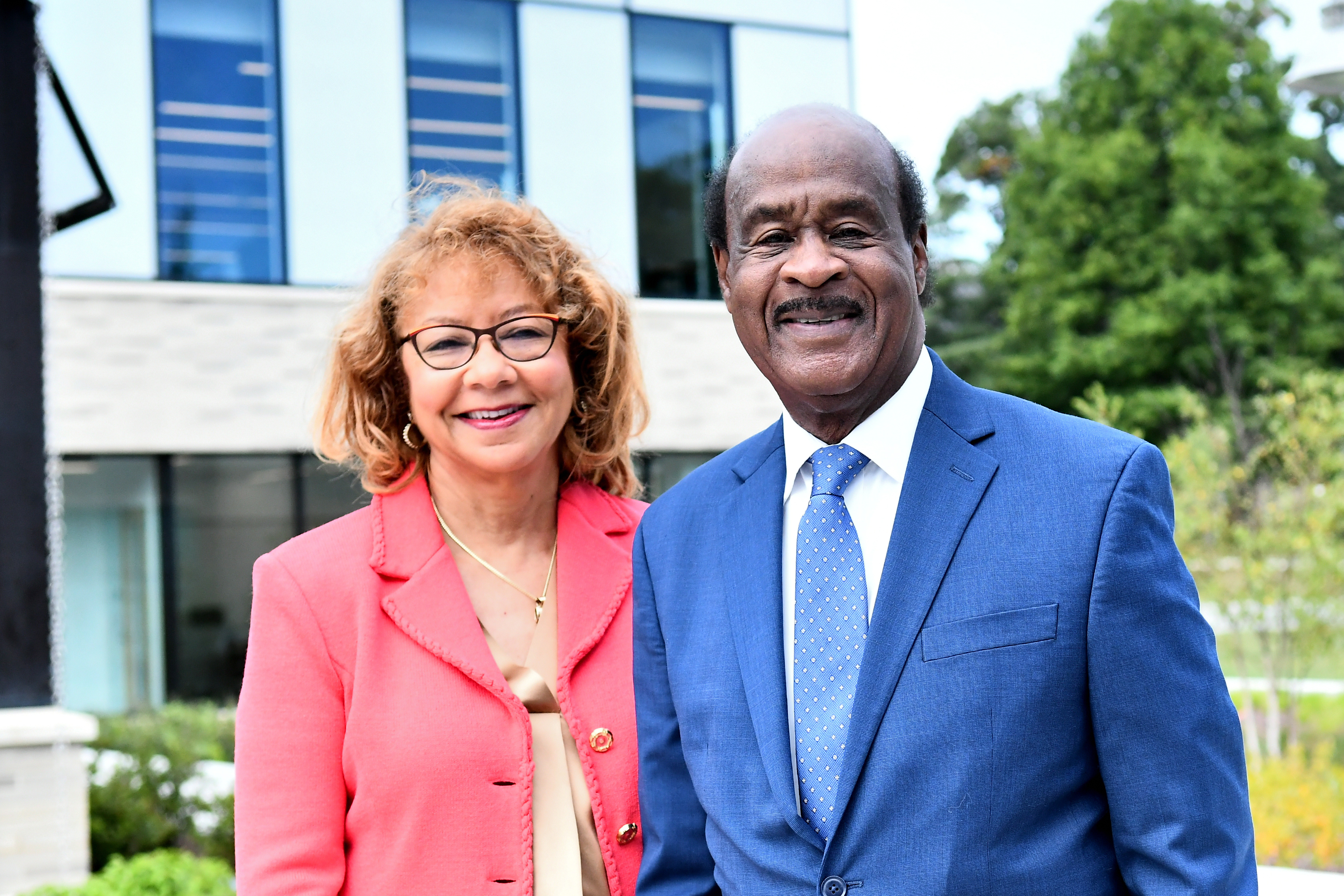
Leggett and his wife Catherine in 2024

Leggett is currently married to his second wife, Catherine.

Leggett and his wife are longtime philanthropic supporters of Montgomery College, with Catherine receiving an honorary degree in 2019. In September 2024, the college dedicated its Math and Science Building to Catherine and Isiah.

Political offices
| Preceded by Doug Duncan | Executive of Montgomery County, Maryland; 2006–2018 | Succeeded by Marc Elrich |
