= Howard A. Denis =

American politician

Member of the Montgomery County Council from the 1st district
- In office May 1, 2000 – December 4, 2006
- Preceded by: Betty Ann Krahnke
- Succeeded by: Roger Berliner

Member of the Maryland Senate from the 16th district
- In office January 4, 1977 – January 11, 1995
- Preceded by: Newton Steers
- Succeeded by: Brian Frosh

Personal details
- Born: November 21, 1939 (age 86)
- Party: Republican
- Spouse: Babette
- Children: 1
- Education: Georgetown University (AB, LLB)

Howard A. Denis (born November 21, 1939) is an American politician who served in the Maryland Senate from the 16th district from 1977 to 1995. In addition to serving in the Senate, he previously served on the Montgomery County Council from 2000 to 2006. In 1977, he was appointed to the Senate after Newton Steers was elected to Congress. In 1994, Denis ran for Lieutenant Governor of Maryland. However, he lost the Republican primary election to Paul Rappaport. In 2000, Denis ran for a special election in district 1 on the Montgomery County Council. He won that election and succeeded incumbent, Betty Ann Krahnke, who resigned. He was elected to a full term in 2002, but lost reelection in 2006.

Denis received his undergraduate and LLB degrees from Georgetown University.
