= Roger Berliner =

American politician (born 1951)

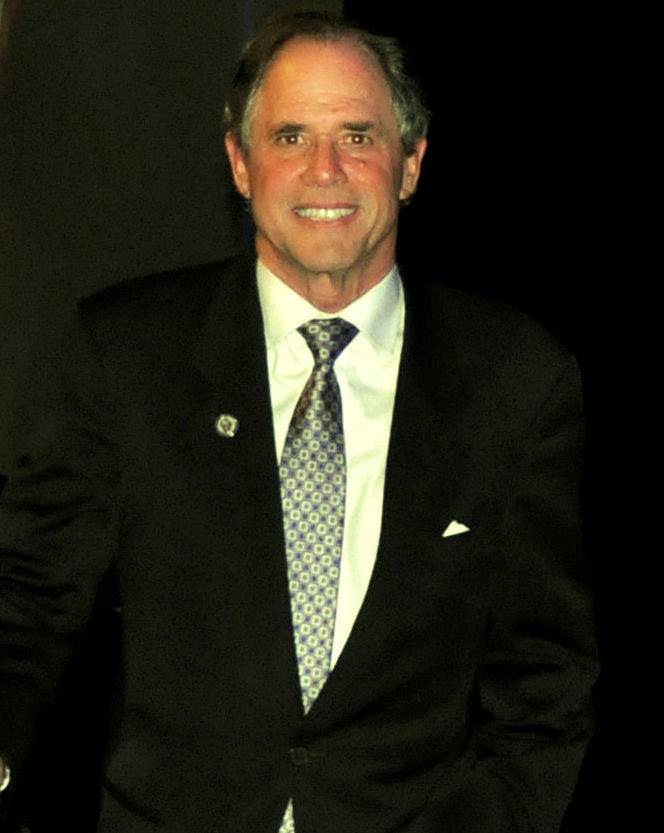

Member of the Montgomery County Council from District 1
- In office December 4, 2006 – 2018
- Preceded by: Howard A. Denis
- Succeeded by: Andrew Friedson

Personal details
- Born: February 12, 1951 (age 75) Cincinnati, Ohio, U.S.
- Party: Democratic
- Occupation: Attorney, Public official

Roger Berliner (born February 12, 1951) is a former member of the Montgomery County Council from 2006 to 2018. He represented District 1, which includes parts of Poolesville, Potomac, Bethesda, and Chevy Chase.

== Early years ==
Berliner was born in Cincinnati, Ohio, on February 12, 1951.

Berliner earned his Bachelor of Arts degree from Dartmouth College and a Juris Doctor from the McGeorge School of Law of the University of the Pacific.

Berliner was an attorney specializing in energy law and a partner for Manatt, Phelps & Phillips LLP. Some of the clients he represented included Canadian gas producers, the Government of Guam, and Nevada Power Company. On behalf of his client Pacific Gas and Electric, Berliner sent a petition to the Maryland Public Service Commission proposing to give customers the option of paying an additional four dollars per month to fund the planting of trees to reduce carbon dioxide in the atmosphere.

Berliner is the president of Berliner Law PLLC.

== Early political career and activism ==
Berliner served as legislative director for United States Senator Howard Metzenbaum of Ohio. He served as senior policy advisor for Congressman Henry Waxman of California. Berliner worked as director of Congressional liaison for the Carter administration.

Berliner was the Maryland coordinator for Bill Bradley's presidential campaign in 1999.

== Montgomery County Council ==
=== 2000 election ===
On January 11, 2000, Betty Ann Krahnke announced that she would resign from representing District 1 on the Montgomery County Council. Krahnke had been battling Lou Gehrig's disease for the preceding 18 months, and she was unable to walk or speak. Krahnke said she would leave office after a special election would be held to fill her seat. Krahnke had represented District 1 since the council was changed in 1990 to include district seats.

Berliner announced that we would run for the seat on the council. Tony Puca also ran for the seat. Puca was a life insurance agent who was known for volunteer work with elders and people with developmental disabilities. Ilene Solomon, a special education teacher, also ran for the Democratic nomination. Howard A. Denis, former state senator; Casey Aiken, a real estate attorney; Sharon Constantine, a local activist; Scott Dyer, a computer engineer; and Mary Kane, an attorney.

Berliner supported transportation improvements including building the Intercounty Connector. Baptiste preferred improving transportation without building the Purple Line and Intercounty Connector.

Incumbent Krahnke endorsed Democrat Patricia Baptiste and donated her remaining campaign funds to Baptiste's campaign, which alarmed local Republican party officials.

Baptiste won the Democratic primary by 17 percentage points. Denis won the Republican primary and went on to win in the general election.

=== 2006 election ===
In January 2006, Berliner announced he would run to represent District 1 on the Council again. In his announcement, Berliner said he would increase regulation and oversight of development, reduce traffic, and modernize public schools. Berliner proposed mandatory sustainable building standards for government buildings. He supported an unimplemented law giving a tax credit for purchasing hybrid vehicles and a tax surcharge for purchasing vehicles with low fuel efficiency.

Duchy Trachtenberg considered running for the District 1 seat, but Trachtenberg ended up running for an at-large seat instead.

Berliner ran against incumbent Howard A. Denis. Neither faced opposition in the primary election.

Berliner said that, as a Democrat, he could do more for his constituents than Denis, the only incumbent Republican. Berliner said that Denis' sway in the council was diminished because of his party affiliation, and that residents would be better represented by a Democratic Council member. Berliner criticized Denis for being a populist, rather than someone with consistent principles. Berliner criticized Denis for hiding the fact that he had sought to be a delegate for President George W. Bush in 2004, while Berliner had helped John Kerry's presidential campaign in Florida.

Berliner criticized Denis' vote to lift a tax on developers that was intended to pay for new roads and schools to ease the impact of development. Berliner also characterized Clarksburg's development problems as a failure by Denis. Denis said he had advocated for anti-developer bills, such as one to prevent developers from destroying large trees to build mansions.

The editorial board of The Washington Post endorsed Denis' reelection. The editorial board complimented Denis' hard work on the council, although it disagreed with his stance against the Purple Line.

Denis received the endorsement of Neighbors for a Better Montgomery, an organization advocating slower growth. Denis was also proud to his successful passage of legislation to restrict residents from erecting mansions on small residential lots. Berliner won the general election, receiving 56 percent of the vote.

=== First term ===
Berliner took the oath of office on December 4, 2006.

The Council considered instituting a moratorium on subdivision developments. The proposal would have stalled 72 projects that were under consideration. Berliner voted against the moratorium.

Responding to the practice of demolishing small, older homes and building larger homes in their place, Berliner helped create a task force to evaluate and propose solutions. The task force was composed of residents, representatives of the home building industry, an architect, and a real estate agent. Berliner introduced the task force's proposed bill, which reduced the size of homes allowed on small lots, changed the building heights allowed, and changed neighborhood notification procedures.

Asked whether he would support building another bridge over the Potomac River in Montgomery County, Berliner said he would not.

Berliner sponsored a proposal to ban fences and other structures on property near the C&O Canal National Historical Park. The proposal was intended so that the park's visitors would not have to see a large wall next to the park. Berliner also supported a proposed ordinance that would require the county's approval before the removal of a tree from a residential lots.

Berliner supported a proposed bill to require people employing domestic workers to provide written contracts describing working conditions, hours, and pay to employees working at least 20 hours a week. The laws regarding overtime and pay frequency that apply to other types of employees would also apply to domestic workers. Workers who live in their employer's house would need to be given a private room for sleeping with a door that can be locked as well as access to a kitchen, a bathroom, and laundry facilities.

In December 2008, the Council unanimously elected Berliner to a one-year term as the council's next vice president. Berliner's term ended in August 2009, when Councilmember Valerie Ervin was elected vice president of the council.

In January 2009, the Maryland/D.C./Virginia Solar Energy Industries Association awarded its annual Solar Champions of the Year Award to Berliner. The award was in recognition of legislation Berliner supported that would allow property tax credits for installation of solar panels. In 2010, Berliner proposed a carbon dioxide tax on major polluters in the county. He proposed a tax of five dollars per ton in excess of one million tons per year. At the time, only a coal-fired power plant in Dickerson exceeded one million tons of carbon dioxide. The power plant was the source of twenty-five percent of the county's carbon dioxide emissions. Berliner said the $15 million that the bill would raise could give tax credits to residents who install energy-efficiency products in their homes. The bill passed the council. The power plant company sued the county, saying the tax targeted it.

In 2009, Berliner supported giving people the option of paying for parking meters using a cell phone.

Berliner supported a bill that would require the county's contractors and subcontractors to provide benefits to spouses and registered domestic partners of their employees, without regard to gender.

Berliner voted in favor of a bill to give a tax credit to local small businesses engaged in the research, development, or commercialization of innovative and proprietary technology that comprises, interacts with, or analyzes biological material.

Berliner criticized the county's government's deal with Live Nation for the Fillmore Silver Spring. The deal gave Live Nation a special exemption from zoning and design rules, the County paid for most increased construction costs, and $80,000 in annual tax breaks. Berliner thought the money spent on the deal should not have taken priority when the county was also cutting critical services.

The Council elected Berliner to the position of vice president of the Council on December 3, 2008. His term ended on December 2, 2009, when Valerie Ervin was elected to the position of vice president.

=== 2010 election ===
In 2010, Berliner ran for reelection. He was challenged in the Democratic primary by community activist Ilaya Hopkins of Bethesda.

Berliner told The Washington Post that most urgent problem facing his constituents was the county government's budget. Berliner said the county's budget problems were caused by too much development too quickly. He supported the cuts that the council had already made and that he had voted for.

Hopkins blamed the county's fiscal problems on Berliner's irresponsibility on the council. Hopkins also criticized Berliner for inaction after electricity outages.

Berliner won the Democratic primary with 75 percent of the vote.

In the general election, Berliner was challenged by Republican Rob Vricella of Chevy Chase Village.

Rob Vricella predicted that the council would balance the county government's budget by increasing taxes. Vricella said the county's most urgent problem was the county's fiscal health. Vricella said that Montgomery County's tax rates were stunting economic growth and leading to job losses. He said the key was to reduce the county government's spending.

The editorial board of The Washington Post endorsed Berliner's candidacy in the general election. Former Council member Howard Denis endorsed Vricella's candidacy.

Berliner won the general election with 68 percent of the vote.

=== Second term ===
After electricity outages following a snowstorm, Berliner criticized Pepco's performance, saying that Pepco's shareholders have benefited while residents have not. Berliner said Pepco had allowed its power system to degrade, leading to unacceptably unreliable electricity service. When Pepco asked the council for expanded authority to trim trees on private property, Berliner said that excessive power outages were due to Pepco's perpetual lack of maintenance on its system, not overgrown trees.

Berliner co-sponsored legislation that would require county permits for any work done in the county right-of-way that affects roadside trees. The Department of Permitting Services would make sure that roadside trees would be saved if possible. Berliner also supported a bill to require property owners who apply for a sediment control permit to plant trees.

In May 2011, the Council voted to institute a five-cent tax on plastic and paper bags provided at most retail stores. Paper bags from restaurants, bags holding prescription drugs, dry-cleaning bags, and bags for perishable and bulk items were exempted from the tax. The tax revenue funds improvements in the water quality of streams and reductions in the impact of stormwater runoff. Berliner voted in favor of the tax.

In 2011, Berliner voted in favor of giving Westfield Corporation $4 million to pay for construction costs related to Costco's move to Westfield Wheaton.

Peterson Companies proposed to build a retail, office, and hotel project on 100 acres (0.40 km^{2}) east of Interstate 270 in Clarksburg. Located near the site was Ten Mile Creek, one of the last unpolluted creeks in Montgomery County. The Council listened to scientific testimony that the runoff from the development would pollute the clean creek. There was also a study that the development could damage the viability of Clarksburg Town Center, which had been planned to be built nearby. Berliner joined with the majority of the council to vote to limit the size of the development by about half.

The Council elected Berliner to the position of vice president of the Council in December 2010. He served in that position until December 2011, when the Council elected Nancy Navarro to the position. The Council elected Berliner to the position of president of the Council on December 6, 2011. He served as president until the Council elected Nancy Navarro to the position on December 5, 2012.

=== 2014 election ===
Berliner ran for a third term on the council. Duchy Trachtenberg challenged Berliner in the Democratic primary. A family therapist by profession, Trachtenberg had been a president of the Maryland chapter of the National Organization for Women and an at-large Council member from 2006 to 2010.

An engineering firm connected to a proposed development in Clarksburg criticized Berliner's vote to limit development in Clarksburg to reduce pollution of Ten Mile Creek. Berliner defended the vote, saying it was appropriate and that he was proud of his record of supporting development elsewhere such as in White Flint.

Berliner's reelection was endorsed by the Sierra Club and Service Employees International Union Local 500. Trachtenberg's candidacy was endorsed by Democracy for America, Metropolitan Washington Council AFL–CIO and Fraternal Order of Police Lodge 35.

Berliner won the Democratic primary with 79 percent of the vote.

In the general election, Republican Jim Kirkland challenged Berliner. Kirkland was a part-time yard worker. Kirkland supported relaxing of enforcement of drunk driving laws because they hurt businesses and discourage social drinking. Kirkland said that the county's enforcement of building code violations was part of a plan to drive out working class residents.

After The Washington Post received an email from Kirkland with anti-Semitic slurs, the Montgomery County Republican Party dropped its endorsement of Kirkland's candidacy and deleted his name from its website. Asked by a reporter about the email, Kirkland said he stood by his email's content. Kirkland defended the email saying he had sent it to The Washington Post before he had begun campaigning and that he had not used any anti-Semitic language since campaigning.

Berliner won with 68 percent of the vote.

=== Third term ===
Berliner co-sponsored a bill to prohibit the use of electronic cigarettes in public places where traditional tobacco smoking is prohibited. The bill also required child-resistant packaging for liquid nicotine containers sold in retail outlets.

Berliner sponsored a bill to create a green bank that would provide low-cost financing for residential and commercial solar electricity projects and energy-efficiency improvements. The green bank would receive its initial fundraising from revenue from the merger settlement with Pepco-Exelon.

Berliner voted for a Council resolution that asked the Maryland General Assembly to reform the county's liquor control system. The resolution asked the state to lift Montgomery County Department of Liquor Control's monopoly on selling liquor in the county. Berliner said the poor performance by the Department of Liquor Control's poor performance was the reason he supported the resolution.

Berliner voted against a bill to ban the use of certain pesticides on county-owned and private lawns.

Berliner cosponsored a bill to allow people age 65 and older, with individual or combined gross incomes of $80,000 or less, to defer increases on property taxes on their principal residence until they sell their home. The $80,000 threshold was chosen to make sure approximately half of the senior citizens living in the county would qualify.

=== 2018 election ===
Berliner ran for Montgomery County Executive in 2018. Berliner lost the Democratic primary election, coming in fourth place out of six candidates on the ballot.

== Electoral history ==
=== 2000 ===
2000 primary election, Montgomery County Council, District 1
| Party | Candidate | Votes | % |
|---|---|---|---|
| Democratic | Patricia S. Baptiste | 13,697 | 53 |
| Democratic | Roger Berliner | 8,505 | 36 |
| Democratic | Ilene S. Solomon | 1,455 | 6 |
| Democratic | Tony Puca | 1,264 | 5 |

=== 2006 ===
2006 primary election, Montgomery County Council, District 1
| Party | Candidate | Votes | % |
|---|---|---|---|
| Democratic | Roger Berliner | 17,284 | 100 |

2006 general election, Montgomery County Council, District 1
| Party | Candidate | Votes | % |
|---|---|---|---|
| Democratic | Roger Berliner | 41,518 | 56 |
| Republican | Howard A. Denis (incumbent) | 32,615 | 44 |
| | write-ins | 56 | 0 |

=== 2010 ===
2010 primary election, Montgomery County Council, District 1
| Party | Candidate | Votes | % |
|---|---|---|---|
| Democratic | Roger Berliner | 14,951 | 75 |
| Democratic | Ilaya Hopkins | 4,874 | 25 |

2010 general election, Montgomery County Council, District 1
| Party | Candidate | Votes | % |
|---|---|---|---|
| Democratic | Roger Berliner | 46,156 | 68 |
| Republican | Rob Vricella | 21,702 | 32 |
| | write-ins | 94 | 0 |

=== 2014 ===
2014 primary election, Montgomery County Council, District 1
| Party | Candidate | Votes | % |
|---|---|---|---|
| Democratic | Roger Berliner | 18,000 | 79 |
| Democratic | Duchy Trachtenberg | 4,922 | 21 |

2014 general election, Montgomery County Council, District 1
| Party | Candidate | Votes | % |
|---|---|---|---|
| Democratic | Roger Berliner | 45,301 | 68 |
| Republican | Jim Kirkland | 20,780 | 31 |

Political offices
| Preceded by Howard A. Denis | Montgomery County Council; District 1 December 4, 2006 – December 1, 2018 | Succeeded by Andrew Friedson |
