= Doug Duncan =

American politician from Maryland

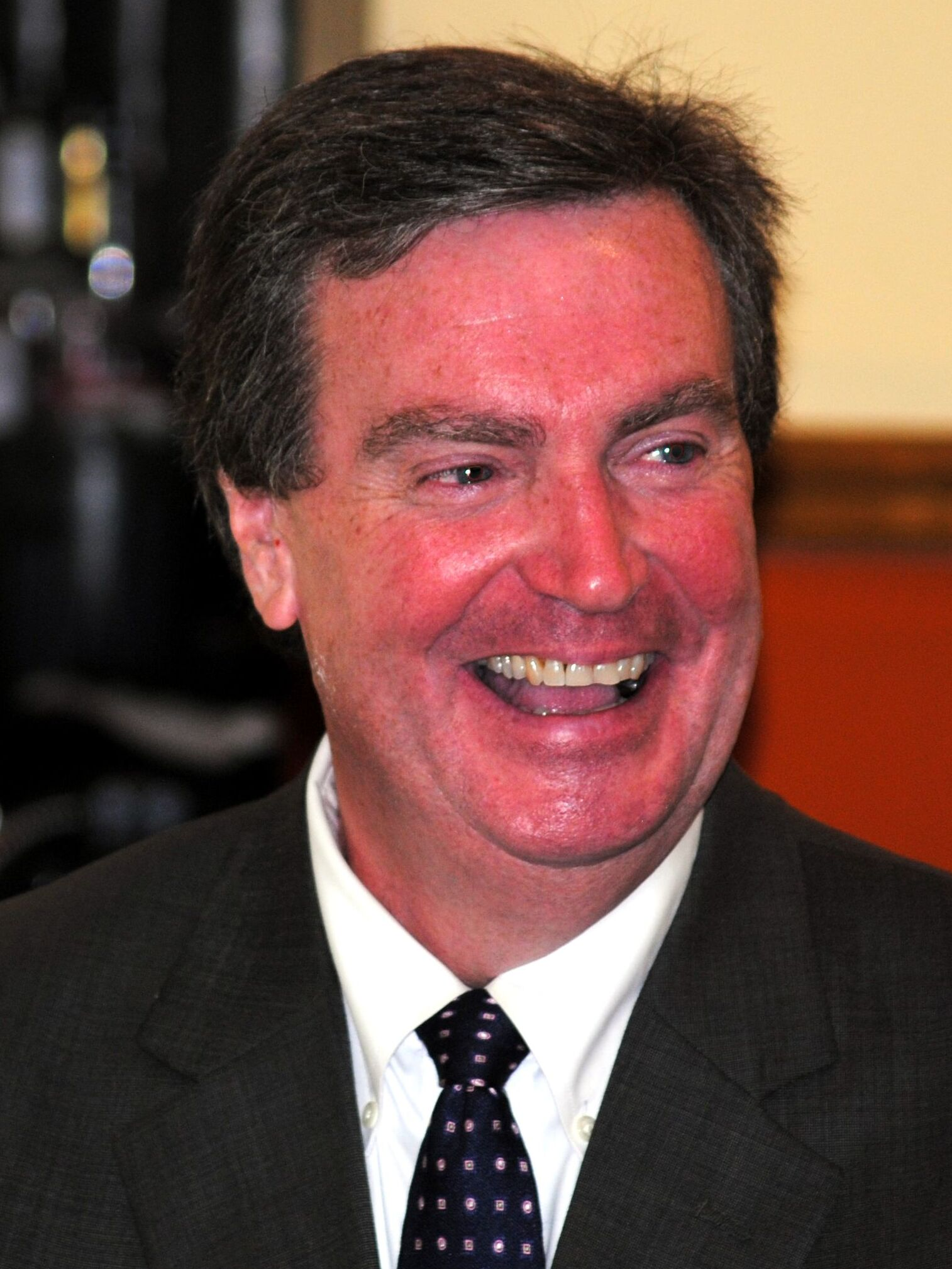
- Duncan in 2014

5th Montgomery County Executive
- In office December 5, 1994 – December 4, 2006
- Preceded by: Neal Potter
- Succeeded by: Ike Leggett

Mayor of Rockville
- In office 1987–1993
- Preceded by: Steven VanGrack
- Succeeded by: James Coyle

Member of the Rockville City Council
- In office 1982–1987

Personal details
- Born: Douglas Michael Duncan; October 25, 1955 (age 71) Rockville, Maryland, U.S.
- Party: Democratic
- Spouse: Barbara Duncan (m. 1980)
- Children: 5
- Education: Columbia University; St. John's College High School
- Occupation: President & CEO at Leadership Greater Washington; Public official Former politician Former Vice President for Administrative Affairs at the University of Maryland, College Park
- Website: lgwdc.org

Douglas Michael Duncan (born October 25, 1955) is a former American politician from Maryland who served as Rockville City Councilman, Rockville Mayor, Montgomery County Executive, and candidate for Governor of Maryland. He is a member of the Democratic Party. Duncan currently serves as president and CEO of Leadership Greater Washington, a position he has held since 2014.

== Early life and education ==
Duncan was born on October 25, 1955. The fifth of 13 children, Duncan grew up in the Twinbrook section of Rockville, Maryland, a working-class neighborhood, home to federal employees, teachers, police officers and firefighters. His father worked for the NSA and later worked for the Montgomery County Public Schools as a volunteer tutor and ESOL teacher. His mother worked for the Montgomery County Circuit Court as a courtroom clerk from 1973 to 1999.

Duncan attended St. John's College High School in Washington, D.C., graduating in 1973. He graduated from Columbia University in three years, in 1976, earning a bachelor's degree with a double focus in psychology and political science. Upon graduating, Doug worked for Montgomery County's criminal justice commission, and then spent 13 years in the private sector working in the telecommunications industry for AT&T.

Duncan got his start in politics at an early age, going door-to-door with his mother for John F. Kennedy's presidential campaign, and was the only one of his 12 siblings to follow in his mother's Democratic-activist footsteps.

== Career ==
=== City of Rockville Council ===
Duncan's first full-time experience in politics was as a field director for Charlie Gilchrist's campaign for Montgomery County Executive in 1978, which Gilchrist won by a margin of better than 3-to-2. Deciding to run for political office himself, Duncan ran for and was elected to Rockville City Council in 1982 at the age of 26. He would be re-elected twice to that position. In 1984, Duncan called for the resignation of then-Mayor John Freeland, who had taken a job with a city developer, claiming it was a rank conflict of interest. Freeland resigned that year.

=== City of Rockville Mayor ===
After serving three terms as Rockville City Councilman, Duncan ran for Mayor of Rockville in 1987, beating incumbent Steven VanGrack. During his six years as Mayor, Doug started the process of redevelopment in downtown Rockville, which included tearing down the Rockville Mall. That project would serve as inspiration for his revitalization of downtown Silver Spring years later as Montgomery County Executive. Accomplishments under the Duncan administration include building Wootton Parkway and Gude Drive bridge. One of his proudest accomplishments was starting Hometown Holidays, Rockville's annual Memorial Day weekend festival.

=== Montgomery County Executive ===
Duncan successfully ran for Montgomery County Executive in 1994, defeating Councilman Bruce Adams by nine percentage points in the Democratic Primary and earning 63% of the vote against Steve Abrams in the general election. Duncan would go on to be re-elected twice for a then unprecedented three terms as County Executive. During Duncan's tenure as County Executive, he focused on improving educational excellence, strengthening environmental protections, fighting poverty and urban blight, and positioning Montgomery County as an international biotechnology leader and economic engine for Maryland all while managing a multi-billion dollar annual budget.

The Washington Post described his governing style as "county leadership that knows when to quit mulling and start moving." Due to his long tenure and influence, media observers later described him as "Montgomery's dominant political figure for over a decade."

Duncan's focus on education included increasing investments in higher education opportunities for county residents, leading to the expansion of Montgomery College's Rockville, Takoma Park, and Germantown campuses. Duncan's advocacy for Montgomery College helped lead to the planning and development of many new initiatives and institutes including the college's High Technology and Science center, Humanities Institute, Information Technology Institute and Health and Science Center. Duncan also played a role in creating the Universities at Shady Grove Center and encouraging the growth of the Johns Hopkins University Shady Grove Campus.

Duncan was County Executive during the DC sniper attacks, seven of which occurred in Montgomery County in October 2002.

Some of Duncan's top accomplishments during his three terms in office were the revitalization of downtown Silver Spring, including the relocation of Discovery's world headquarters and the opening of the AFI Silver Theatre and Culture Center, the building of Strathmore, a cultural and artistic venue and institution, the Maryland Soccer Plex, gaining the approval for building of the Intercounty Connector, and becoming the first county ever in the United States to implement an earned income tax credit.

Amongst his many awards and accolades during his tenure, one of the most notable was being named Washingtonian of the Year in 2002.

=== Race for Maryland Governor ===
In 2005, Duncan announced his candidacy for the Democratic Party's nomination to challenge incumbent Governor Robert Ehrlich in the 2006 Maryland gubernatorial election. His main rival in the Democratic primary election was Baltimore Mayor Martin J. O'Malley. He announced his campaign with a bus tour through each of Maryland's 23 counties and Baltimore City.

During the campaign, Duncan trailed O'Malley and Ehrlich in fundraising. Education became a defining issue in the race: while schools in Duncan's home jurisdiction of Montgomery County had a good reputation, a judge had ordered a state takeover of Baltimore's troubled special education programs in 2005. Duncan began airing television ads in May 2006, relatively early in the campaign season; his poll numbers began to rise in the following weeks.

On June 22, 2006, Duncan unexpectedly dropped out of the race citing a diagnosis of clinical depression. During the brief announcement of his withdrawal, he said that he had at first thought he was simply experiencing physical and mental fatigue associated with campaigning, but that the symptoms had progressed beyond simple fatigue, and sought medical treatment which resulted in the depression diagnosis. He cited a family history of the disease as a factor in the diagnosis, and a number of aides and political associates were quoted in the press saying that Duncan was noticeably unhappy in the period leading up to his withdrawal. During his withdrawal announcement, Duncan endorsed his Democratic primary opponent, Martin O'Malley, in the latter's race against incumbent Republican Governor Robert Ehrlich. At the time of the announcement, polls showed Duncan closing in on O'Malley even as his fundraising was beginning to decline. This weakness in fundraising had led to speculation that Duncan would drop out during the summer, even before the announcement of the depression diagnosis. Reports at the time suggested that his dropping out would have a significant effect on state politics, making it easier for O'Malley to unseat Ehrlich and lowering turnout in the Democratic primary, thereby affecting down ballot races as well. O'Malley won the election and became governor.

=== Clinical depression ===
Duncan was honored by a number of mental health groups for having publicly announced that he suffered from depression. The public nature of his declaration led to an increase in the number of calls to Montgomery County mental health agencies from people seeking mental health help. In the months after his withdrawal, he continued to seek counseling for a time and began a medical regiment to treat the depression. He continued to publicly discuss these treatments and his experiences with the disease, including speaking at a NIH Forum on it.

In an April 2009 Baltimore Sun article, Duncan proclaimed, "I'm living proof that treatment works."

=== University of Maryland and after ===
On March 22, 2007, Duncan was appointed Vice President of Administrative Affairs at the University of Maryland, College Park, effective April 4, making him the university's chief administrative and finance officer with authority over the university's human resources, comptroller, public safety, facilities and environmental management, and procurement. During his tenure, Duncan led the East Campus redevelopment project, designed as a mixed-use town center with graduate student housing along the Route 1 corridor. In association with the project, he also worked to improve relations between the university and the surrounding city of College Park. On October 15, 2008, after a seventeen-month tenure, Duncan announced his resignation from the University of Maryland.

After Maryland, Duncan was self-employed as a consultant advising various enterprises in Greater Washington D.C. Metro Region and beyond regarding economic development, technology and immigration issues. In 2010, Duncan was speculated as being in consideration for General Manager of WMATA, after John Catoe vacated the post, including receiving an endorsement from then Congressman, and now United States Senator Chris Van Hollen.

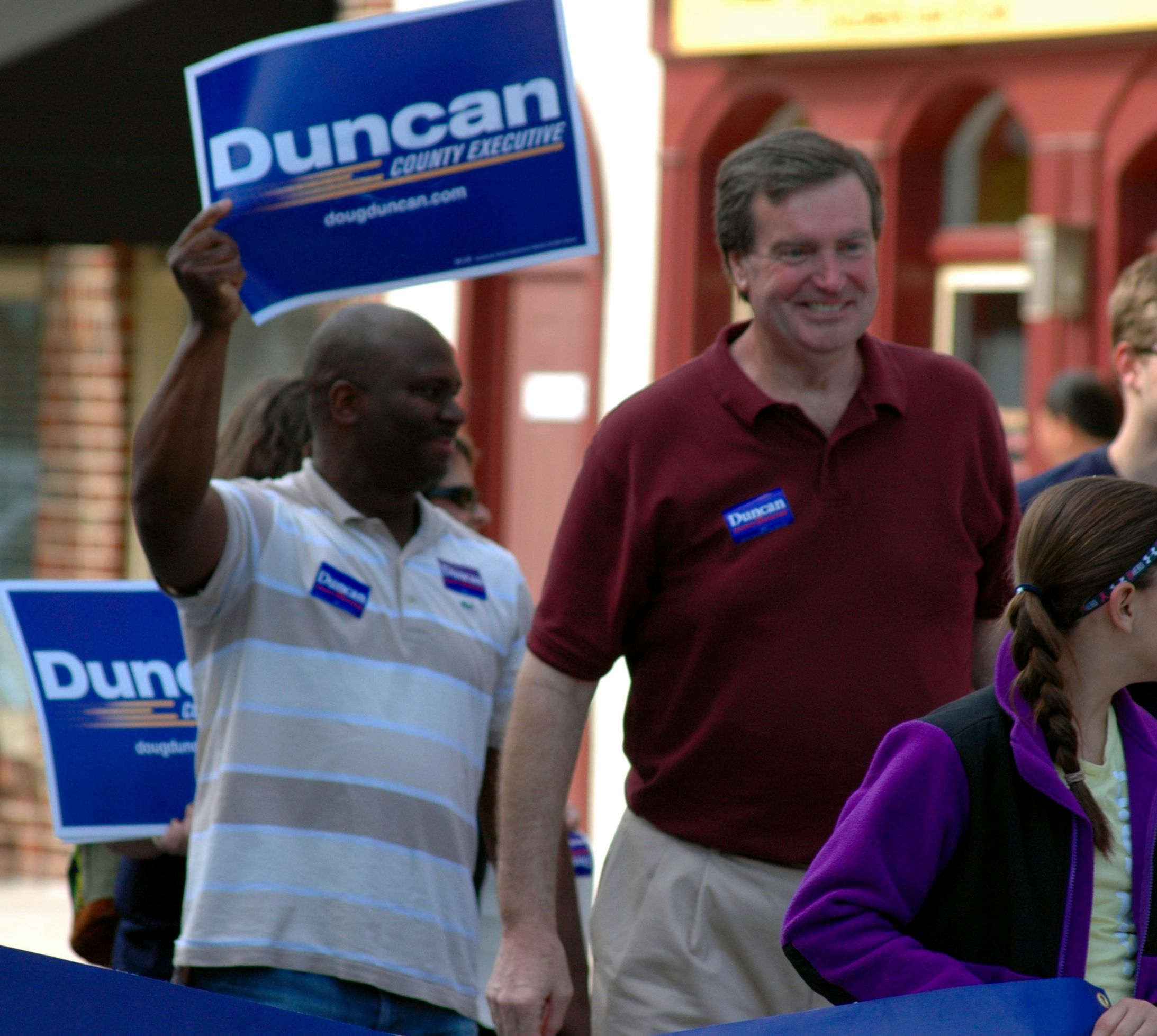
Duncan campaigning in the Kentlands Parade during 2014 election.

=== 2014 Race for Montgomery County Executive ===
In 2014, Duncan made his political comeback seeking to reclaim his old post at Montgomery County, Maryland Executive for a fourth term. Running on a platform of "Leadership In Action" with ideas of revitalizing downtown Wheaton, better attract and keep jobs and business with an improved procurement process and more "open for business" attitude, create express lanes on I-270, build a technology institute venture similar to that of Cornell and New York City, and provide gigabit internet speeds across the county. He lost in the Democratic primary on June 24 to incumbent Ike Leggett.

=== Leadership Greater Washington ===
Shortly after his campaign, Duncan was selected as president and CEO of Leadership Greater Washington, a non-profit organization with a mission to bring leaders together to make positive community impact in the Washington Metropolitan region. The vision for LGW is to help the Washington Metropolitan become a more dynamic and collaborative community with engaged leaders of diverse backgrounds, geographies, and sectors through dynamic, education and membership programs that promote dialogue and cooperation, enabling area leaders to find effective solutions to regional challenges. He still serves in this role today. In this new role, Duncan was named to Washington Business Journal's Power 100 for 2014 and 2015.

=== Continued involvement in politics ===
Despite being out of political office since 2006, Duncan has remained politically active in Maryland and the Washington region.

In 2012, Duncan endorsed then upstart and underdog John Delaney in his first bid for Congress; "Duncan's endorsement was the first of any consequence, and he backed up his support by cutting radio spots for Delaney and going door to door with him".

In 2014, Duncan was named to newly elected Maryland Governor Larry Hogan's transition team as well as that of newly elected District of Columbia Mayor Muriel Bowser.

In 2018, Duncan endorsed David Trone, who was elected to Congress later that year.

== Personal life ==
Duncan married wife, Barbara, on June 14, 1980, on the campus of Trinity College in Washington, D.C., where Barbara went to school. They met in 1978, as Barbara worked for Doug's mom, Ellie, at the Montgomery County Circuit Court. They live in Rockville, Maryland, and have five grown children and two grandchildren.

== In popular culture ==
- Duncan is portrayed by Jay O. Sanders in the 2003 film, D.C. Sniper: 23 Days of Fear.

Political offices
Preceded by Neal Potter	Montgomery County, Maryland Executive; 1994–2006	Succeeded by Ike Leggett
