= Steven Silverman =

American politician

Steve Silverman
- Born: April 25, 1954 (age 71); New Hampshire
- Education: George Washington University Law School, JD; American University, BA
- Website: www.ssgovrelations.com

Steven A. Silverman (born April 25, 1954 in New Hampshire), also known as Steve Silverman, is an American lobbyist, politician and lawyer. Until December 2014, he was Director of the Montgomery County Department of Economic Development.

Silverman was appointed by Montgomery County Executive Isiah Leggett as Director of the Montgomery County Department of Economic Development in April 2009. Just prior to his appointment, Silverman served as the Director of Aging, Health Care, and Special Projects, for Maryland's Attorney General's Office. Prior to that, he served as the Chief of that office's Consumer Protection Division.

Previously, Silverman was a politician and an at-large County Councilmember in Montgomery County, Maryland where he served two four-year terms. He chaired the Council's Planning, Housing, and Economic Development Committee and was twice chosen by his peers to serve as President of the Council.

Silverman, a liberal Democrat, ran in 2006 for Montgomery County Executive, a position being vacated by Doug Duncan, who did not seek re-election. Councilmember Silverman focused his campaign around the issues of relieving traffic congestion, improving education, and increasing affordable housing among many others.

Silverman lost the County Executive primary election, garnering 36% of the vote. Isiah "Ike" Leggett won the primary, receiving 61% of the vote. (Leggett later won the 2006 general election.) Candidate Robert Fustero (who had run for Governor of Maryland in 2002 but lost in the primary to Kathleen Kennedy Townsend) received 3% of the vote.

Silverman appeared in debates against Democratic Party candidate Isiah Leggett, and occasionally debated against independent candidate Robin Ficker or Republican candidate Chuck Floyd.

Silverman is widely recognized for his strong support of taxpayer-funded social services and low-priced housing. He has been instrumental in persuading the Montgomery County Council to fund CASA de Maryland, a group that runs day laborer centers and provides social services to immigrants.

He resigned from his position as Director of the Montgomery County Department of Economic Development in December 2014 to launch a government relations firm, SSGovRelations, LLC.

In 1998, he was the co-chairman of the Silver Spring Redevelopment Steering Committee (Silver Spring, Maryland). In the 1990s, he was an attorney at Silverman and Schild, LLP in Silver Spring, Maryland.
