= Hans Riemer (American politician) =

Maryland politician

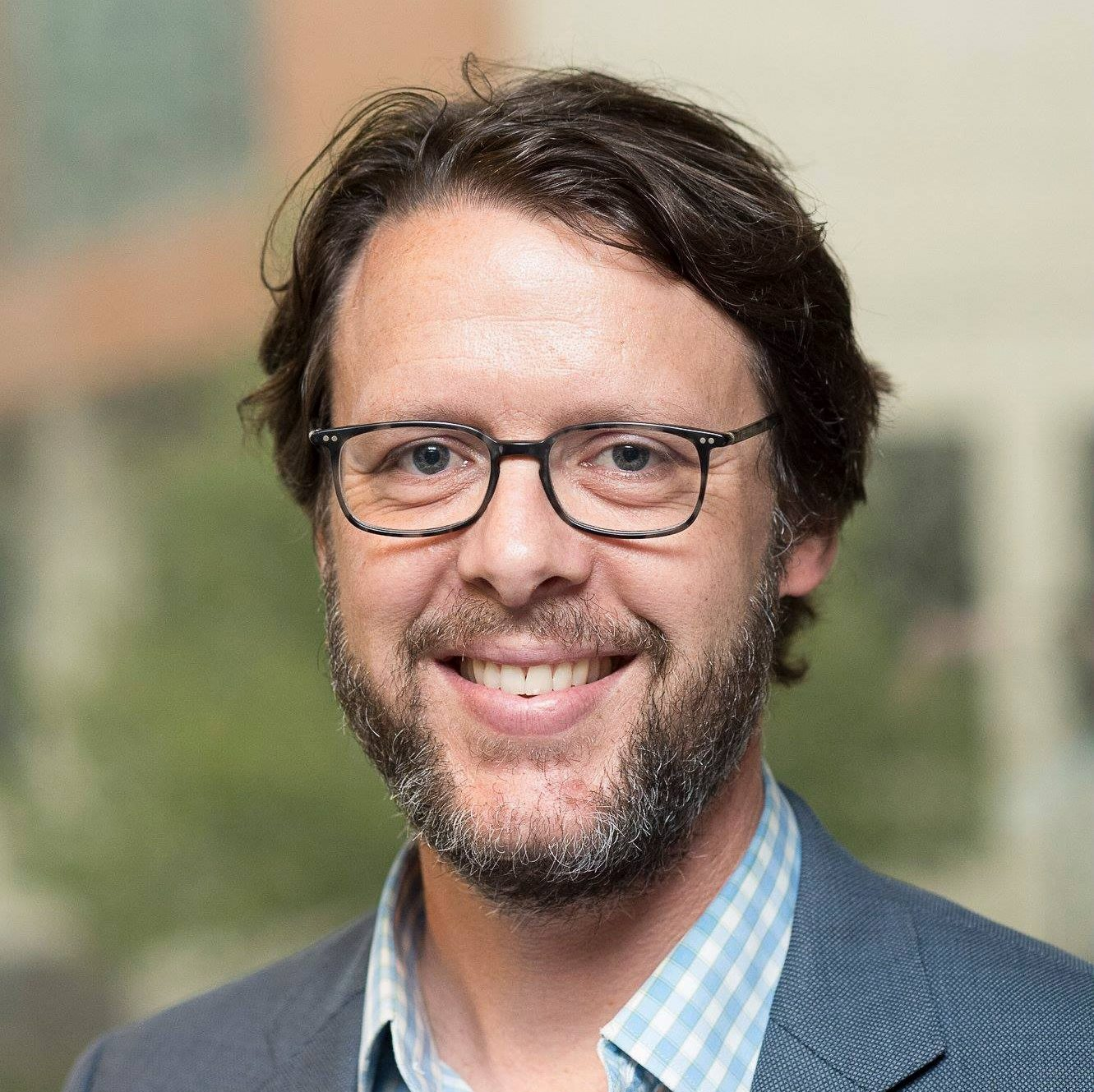
- Riemer in 2020

Member of the Montgomery County Council from the at-large district
- In office December 1, 2010 – December 5, 2022
- Preceded by: Duchy Trachtenberg
- Succeeded by: Laurie-Anne Sayles

Personal details
- Born: Hans Davis Riemer; September 5, 1972 (age 54) Oakland, California, U.S.
- Party: Democratic
- Spouse: Angela Riemer
- Education: University of California, Santa Cruz (BA)
- Occupation: Federal government loan processing clerk
- Profession: Non-profit executive

Hans Davis Riemer (born September 5, 1972) is an American non-profit executive, political activist, and author. He served as an at-large member of the Montgomery County Council in Maryland from 2010 to 2022. He unsuccessfully ran for Montgomery County executive in 2022, with a platform including affordable housing, environmental policy, and police reform.

== Early life and education ==
Riemer was born in Oakland, California, the son of Davis Riemer, an investment advisor, and Louise Rothman-Riemer, a long-time activist and the current president of the League of Women Voters in Oakland. Both Riemer's parents were politically active and often discussed community and national issues at home. He grew up in the Oakland Hills and attended UC Santa Cruz, graduating in 1995 with a Bachelor of Arts in Politics with honors.

"Hans has sort of been enveloped in political activism as long as he's been around," according to his mother, Louise Rothman-Riemer. She noted that when Hans was a toddler, she and her husband, both longtime ACLU activists, carted him to women's rights groups and Alameda County Board of Supervisors meetings: "I just backpacked him and took him everywhere I went."

== Career ==
After graduating from UC Santa Cruz in 1995, Riemer worked for the National Academy of Social Insurance, where he had interned during college. Then in 1995 he was hired as Public Policy Associate at the Save Our Security Coalition, under Arthur S. Flemming.

In 1996 he founded The 2030 Center, a non-profit policy organization focused on protecting Social Security, improving health care, and supporting progressive solutions for fiscal challenges at the federal level. The 2030 Center testified before Congressional committees, White House panels, and conducted activist campaigns. He then served as Senior Policy Analyst and Social Security Campaign Director for the Campaign for America's Future. In that role Riemer organized a national campaign to fight against the privatization of Social Security. President George W. Bush had indicated support for privatization and then appointed the 2001 President's Commission to Strengthen Social Security.

In 2004, Riemer started working for Rock the Vote as their political director. Credited with returning Marion Barry to power in Washington DC following his prison sentence, the organization helped nearly one million people, largely young voters, to register to vote in the 2004 election. Riemer led Rock the Vote's partnership with CNN to host a youth debate in the Democratic presidential primary. Riemer also ran the organization's campaign on the military draft, about which President Bush coined the phrase "on the Internets."

In 2008, Riemer joined the Obama presidential campaign, serving in Chicago as the National Youth Vote Director. His responsibilities included supporting the Campaign's operations in the early states (Iowa, New Hampshire) and working with student leaders to support the Students for Barack Obama network. Young voters were an important part of the Obama's early state voter coalition. After the Obama campaign, Riemer worked for AARP as a senior advisor on retirement security as well as community volunteerism.

Riemer ran for the District 5 seat of the county council in 2006, losing to Valerie Ervin. He successfully ran for an at-large seat in 2010, winning re-election in both 2014 and 2018. From 2014 to 2018, Riemer served as the council president. Riemer spoke publicly in favor of busing and school redistricting. A few months after his presidency concluded, the County announced a $100 million budget deficit. He currently serves as Chairman of the Metropolitan Washington Air Quality Committee and one of only two county officials nationally on the FCC Intergovernmental Advisory Committee. In the Montgomery County Council, he serves as the Lead for Digital Government as well as on the Committees for Planning, Housing, and Economic Development (PHED) and Government Operations & Fiscal Policy (GO).

In June 2021, he declared his candidacy for the position of County executive for Montgomery County. He conceded defeat in the July 2022 primary race.

== Personal life ==
Riemer lives in Takoma Park, Maryland and is married to Angela Riemer (née Walker), the Vice President and Senior Director of Federal Government Relations for Pfizer. They have two children together, Henry and Travis.

== Published works ==
- Riemer, Hans; Cuomo, Christopher (March–April 1997). "The Generation Gambit: The Right's Imaginary Rift Between Young and Old". Extra!. Fairness and Accuracy in Media (FAIR). Archived from the original on April 29, 2019.
- Riemer, Hans; Luna, Adam (Winter 1999). "The 2030 Center: An Intergenerational Agenda". Generations. 22 (4). Archived from the original on November 10, 2019 – via Questia.
