= List of Jamaican Americans =

This is a list of notable Jamaican Americans, including both original immigrants who obtained American citizenship and their American descendants.

== List ==
=== Academics ===
- Opal Palmer Adisa – Professor Emeritus at California College of the Arts
- Elizabeth Alexander – Wun Tsun Tam Mellon Professor in the Humanities in the Department of English and Comparative Literature, Columbia University. Chancellor Emeritus of the Academy of American Poets
- Deborah Archer – Jacob K. Javits Professor at New York University and Professor of Clinical Law at New York University School of Law
- Frederic G. Cassidy (1907-2000) – Professor of English at the University of Wisconsin-Madison. Founder of the Dictionary of American Regional English
- Susan Collins – Provost and Executive Vice President for Academic Affairs at University of Michigan. The Edward M. Gramlich Collegiate Professor of Public Policy and Professor of Economics
- Paul R. Cunningham – Dean Emeritus of the Brody School of Medicine at East Carolina University. The first African-American to serve as dean of the Brody School
- Trevor Dawes – Vice Provost for Libraries and Museums and May Morris University Librarian. President of the Association of College and Research Libraries
- Tashni-Ann Dubroy – Executive Vice President and Chief Operations Officer (COO) of Howard University
- Carol Lani Guinier (1950-2022) – Bennett Boskey Professor of Law at Harvard Law School. The first woman of colour appointed to a tenured professorship at Harvard law school
- Ewart Guinier (1910-1990) – founding chairman of Harvard University's Department of African and African-American Studies
- Donald J. Harris – Professor Emeritus at Stanford University, father of the 49th vice president of the United States, Kamala Harris
- Odette Harris – Professor of Neurosurgery at Stanford University and the Director of the Brain Injury Program for the Stanford University School of Medicine. America’s second Black female professor of neurosurgery
- Peter Blair Henry – Dean of New York University's Leonard N. Stern School of Business and William R. Berkley Professor of Economics and Business
- Jason D. Hill – Professor of Philosophy at DePaul University
- Robert A. Hill – Professor Emeritus of History and Research Professor at the University of California, Los Angeles (UCLA)
- William Jacob Holland (1848-1932) – Chancellor of the University of Pittsburgh and Director of the Carnegie Museums of Pittsburgh
- Jacqueline Hughes-Oliver – Professor of Statistics at North Carolina State University
- Gene Andrew Jarrett – Dean of the Faculty and William S. Tod Professor of English at Princeton University. Founding editor-in-chief of the Oxford Bibliographies module on African American Studies
- Marcia V. Keizs – former president of York College, City University of New York
- Heather Knight – former president of Pacific Union College.The first black president and first female president in Pacific Union College history. The first black female to lead a Seventh-day Adventist college in the United States
- Charles Wade Mills (1951-2021) – Professor at Graduate Center, CUNY and Northwestern University
- Melisa Murray – Professor of law at NYU
- Keith Anthony Morrison – Dean of the Tyler School of Art at Temple University in Philadelphia
- Colin A. Palmer (1944-2019) – Dodge Professor of History at Princeton University
- Orlando Patterson – The John Cowles Professor of Sociology at Harvard University
- Paul Ramphal – Adjunct Assistant Professor of Surgery at the University of North Carolina at Chapel Hill
- Donald Richards – Distinguished Professor Emeritus of Statistics at Pennsylvania State University
- Dorceta Taylor – Senior Associate Dean of Diversity, Equity, and Inclusion at Yale School of the Environment. Also Yale's Professor of Environmental Justice She was the first African American woman to earn a doctoral degree from Yale School of Forestry & Environmental Studies
- Ekwueme Michael Thelwell – founding chairman of the Department of African-American Studies at the University of Massachusetts Amherst
- Heather A. Williams – Geraldine R. Segal Professor of American Social Thought and Professor of Africana Studies at the University of Pennsylvania
- Henry Vernon Wong – Professor Emeritus at the University of Texas, Austin
- Peter Wayne Lewis – Professor Emeritus of Fine Art Painting at Massachusetts College of Art & Design

=== Actors ===
- Roxanne Beckford
- Tyson Beckford
- Harry Belafonte – Emmy, Oscar and Tony Awards winner; first black actor to win an Emmy
- Shari Belafonte
- Marsha Stephanie Blake
- Corbin Bleu – film/television actor and vocalist (High School Musical)
- Doug E. Doug
- Parisa Fitz-Henley
- Chip Fields
- Kim Fields
- Antonia Gentry
- Dulé Hill
- Grace Jones
- Robinne Lee
- Delroy Lindo
- Carl Lumbly
- Camille McDonald
- Alano Miller
- Wentworth Miller
- Shameik Moore
- Lewis Morrison (1844/5-1906) – Grandparent to Constance and Joan Bennett
- Olivia Olson
- Evan Parke
- Jada Pinkett Smith – Daytime Emmy Award winner
- Sheryl Lee Ralph – Primetime Emmy Award winner
- David Reivers
- Kevin Michael Richardson
- Antoinette Robertson
- Frank Silvera (1914-1970)
- Madge Sinclair (1938-1995) – Primetime Emmy Award winner
- Basil Wallace
- Kerry Washington – Primetime Emmy Award winner
- Susan Kelechi Watson
- Robert Wisdom

=== Business ===
- Trisha Bailey – entrepreneur, personal wealth estimated to exceed $700 million
- Richard Arthur Bogle (1835-1904) – Walla Walla's first black businessman. Co-founder of the Walla Walla Savings and Loan Association
- Ann-Marie Campbell – Executive Vice President, U.S. Stores & International Operations, The Home Depot
- Vincent "Randy" Chin (1937-2003) – founder of VP Records
- Susan Collins – President and CEO of the Federal Reserve Bank of Boston (from July 2022). The first black female to lead a regional Federal bank
- Emma Grede – CEO and co-founder (with Khloe Kardashian) of Good American. Founding partner of Skims.
- Golden Krust – founded in Jamaica by the Hawthorne family. Over 100 Golden Krust restaurants operate in the U.S
- Vincent HoSang – CEO and founder of Caribbean Food Delights and Royal Caribbean Bakery
- James Bruce Llewelly (1927-2010) – businessman, personal wealth estimated to exceed $160 million
- Pat McGrath – British Jamaican based in New York. Founder of Pat McGrath Labs which has as an estimated value of $1 billion
- Graham N Robinson – Senior Vice President and President of Stanley Industrial, Stanley Black & Decker
- Janice Savin Williams – Senior Principal and co-founder of The Williams Capital Group, L.P
- Jacky Wright – Chief Digital Officer and Corporate Vice President at Microsoft US
- Jo Cato – entrepreneur, founder, Periwinkle Group, Grab and Go Vending (Airport concession and retail stores)

=== Law ===
- Deborah Archer – President of the American Civil Liberties Union, first African American to hold the position. Civil rights lawyer
- Michelle Bernard – President and CEO of the Bernard Centre For Women, Politics & Public Policy. Lawyer and political analyst
- Renatha Francis – circuit judge
- Claudia L. Gordon – lawyer, first deaf black female attorney in the United States and the first deaf graduate of American University's law school
- Carol Lani Guinier (1950-2022) – civil rights lawyer
- Ewart Guinier (1910-1990) – lawyer and trades union leader
- Maya Harris – lawyer and public policy advocate. Sister of the 49th vice president of the United States, Kamala Harris
- Sheila Jackson Lee – lawyer and politician
- Leondra Kruger – Associate Justice of the Supreme Court of California. Acting Principal Deputy Solicitor General of the United States in the Obama administration
- David Patrick Rowe (1959-2018) – lawyer
- Jewel Scott – first Jamaican American judge in Georgia. First Jamaican American (female) appointed as a Judge of the Clayton County Superior Court. First woman and first Caribbean-American District Attorney for Clayton County.
- Alison Smith – lawyer, first black woman president of Florida's Broward County Bar Association
- James Lopez Watson (1922-2001) – judge of the United States Court of International Trade. First African-American to head a federal court in the American Deep South.
- James S. Watson (1882-1952) – one of the first two black Americans elected as a judge in the state of New York. The first justice of African descent to sit in judgment on white litigants and the first African American attorney nominated to the American Bar Association since 1912
- Barbara M. Watson (1918-1983) – lawyer and diplomat. First black person and the first woman to serve as an Assistant Secretary of State
- Damian Williams – lawyer, first African-American U.S. attorney for the Southern District of New York

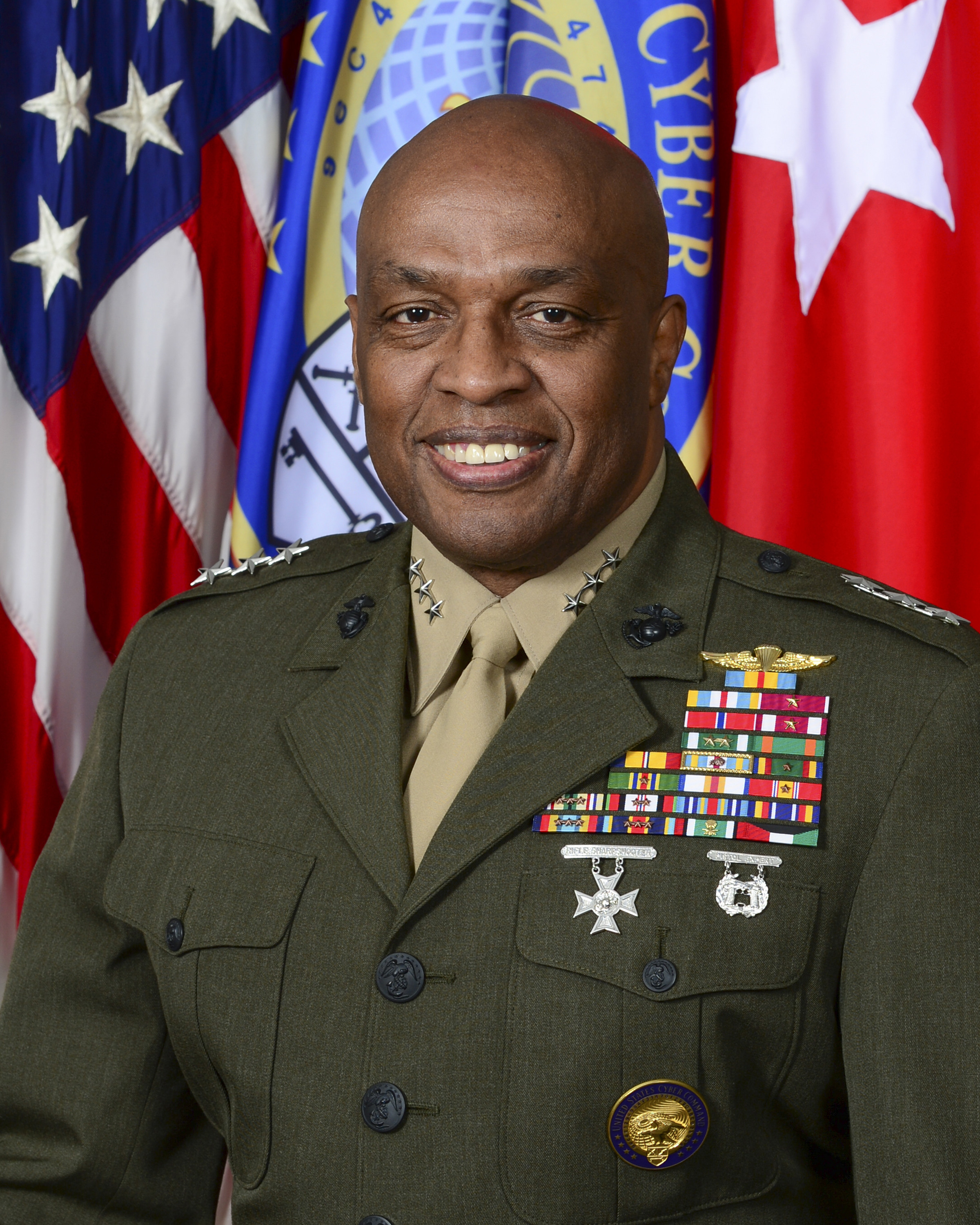
Vincent R. Stewart

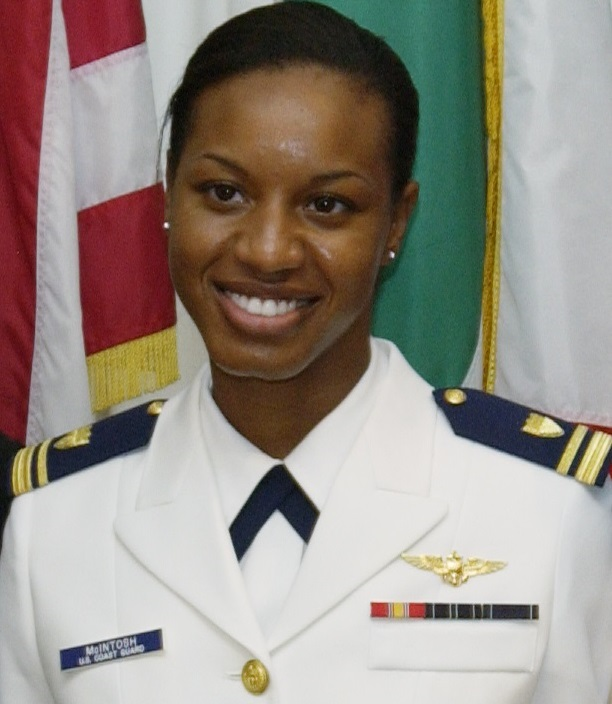
Jeanine Menze

=== Military ===
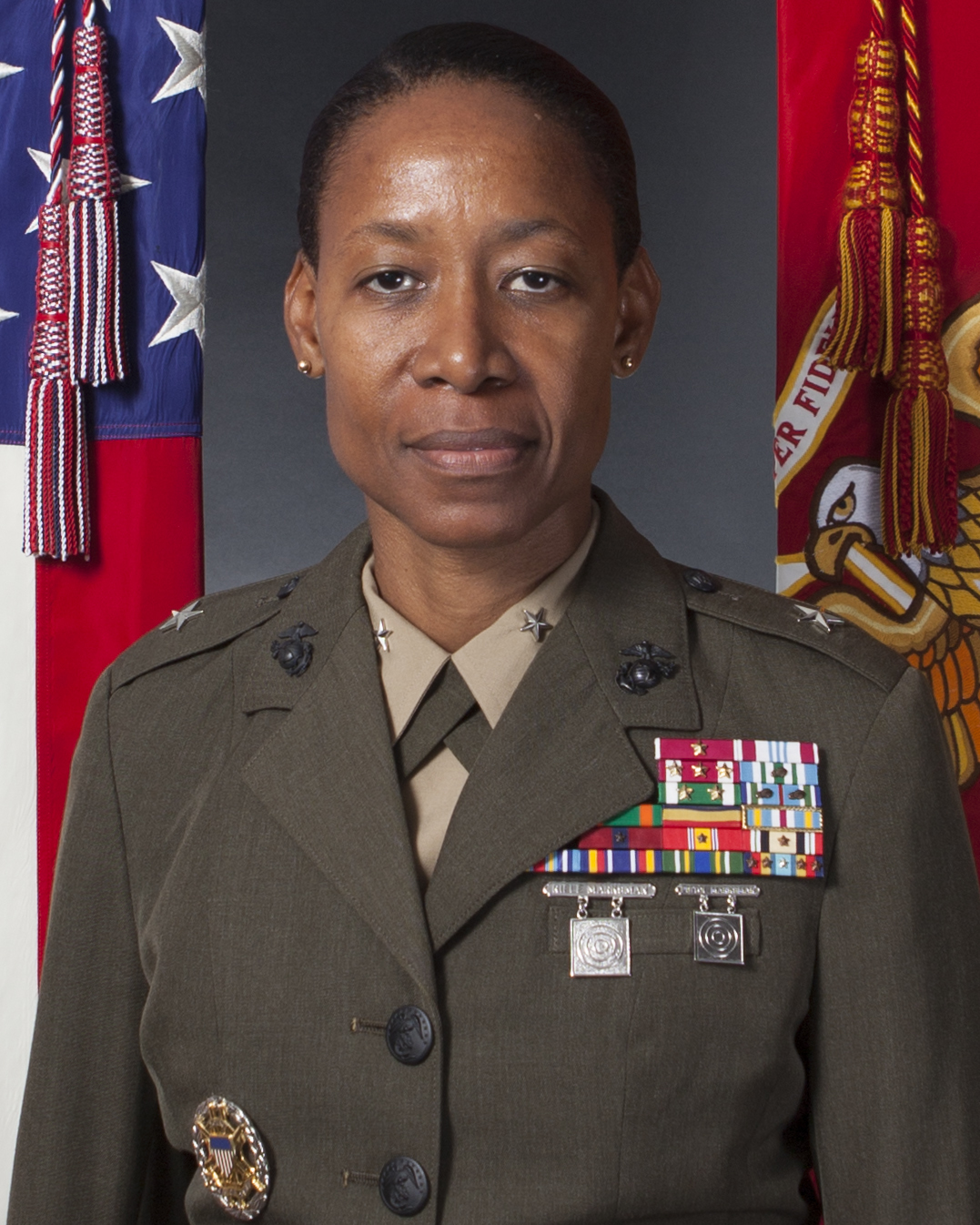
Lorna Mahlock

- Clifford Alexander Jr. – former Secretary of the Army, first African American to hold the position
- John Davis (1854-1903) – United States Navy sailor, recipient of the United States military's highest decoration, the Medal of Honor
- Lorna Mahlock – Brigadier General in the United States Marine Corps; first black female to hold the position
- Jeanine Menze – Commander and first black female aviator in the history of the U.S. Coast Guard
- Colin Luther Powell (1937-2021) – statesman and four-star general in the United States Army
- Vincent R. Stewart – first African American, first Jamaican American and first Marine to hold the position of Director of the DIA

=== Musicians ===
- Aaliyah (1979-2001)
- A-Plus
- Astro – rapper
- Joey Bada$$ – rapper
- Afrika Bambaataa
- Harry Belafonte – three-time Grammy Award winner
- Thom Bell – one of the creators of Philadelphia soul. Two-time Grammy Award winner
- Big Tigger
- Bushwick Bill (1966-2019)
- Busta Rhymes
- Bobby Shmurda
- Luther Campbell (Uncle Luke)
- Canibus
- Capital STEEZ (1993-2012)
- Chubb Rock
- Sandra Denton – Grammy Award winner
- Delroy Edwards
- Diana King
- Etana
- Chuck Fenda
- Flatbush Zombies
- Funkmaster Flex
- CJ Fly
- Heavy D (1967-2011)
- Hodgy Beats
- Grand Puba
- Iniko
- Tori Kelly – two-time Grammy Award winner
- Sean Kingston
- DJ Kool Herc
- KRS-One
- Alaine Laughton
- Masego
- Stephen Marley – eight-time Grammy Award winner
- Moi Renée (died 1997) – singer and performer, known for the 1992 house single "Miss Honey"
- Denroy Morgan (1945-2022)
- Gramps Morgan – member of Grammy Award-winning reggae band Morgan Heritage
- DJ Mustard
- Mýa – Grammy Award winner
- NLE Choppa
- Renee Neufville
- The Notorious B.I.G.(1972-1997) – rapper
- Olivia Longott
- Styles P
- Christopher "Kid" Reid
- Pretty Ricky
- Tarrus Riley
- Pete Rock
- Safaree Samuels
- Gil Scott-Heron (1949-2011) – Grammy Lifetime Achievement Award
- Shaggy – two-time Grammy Award winner
- Ski Mask the Slump God – rapper
- Pop Smoke – rapper
- Robb Banks
- Justine Skye
- Sleepy Hallow
- Ernie Smith
- Wifisfuneral – rapper
- Mike Smith
- Simi Sernaker
- Special Ed
- Lil Tecca – rapper
- Tyga – rapper
- will.i.am – rapper, member of the Black Eyed Peas
- XXXTentacion – rapper
- YFN Lucci – rapper
- Young M.A – rapper
- JPEGMafia
- Tevin Campbell – singer
- Toosii – singer
- Rowdy Rebel – rapper
- Rican Da Menace - rapper
- Slayr - rapper

=== Politics ===
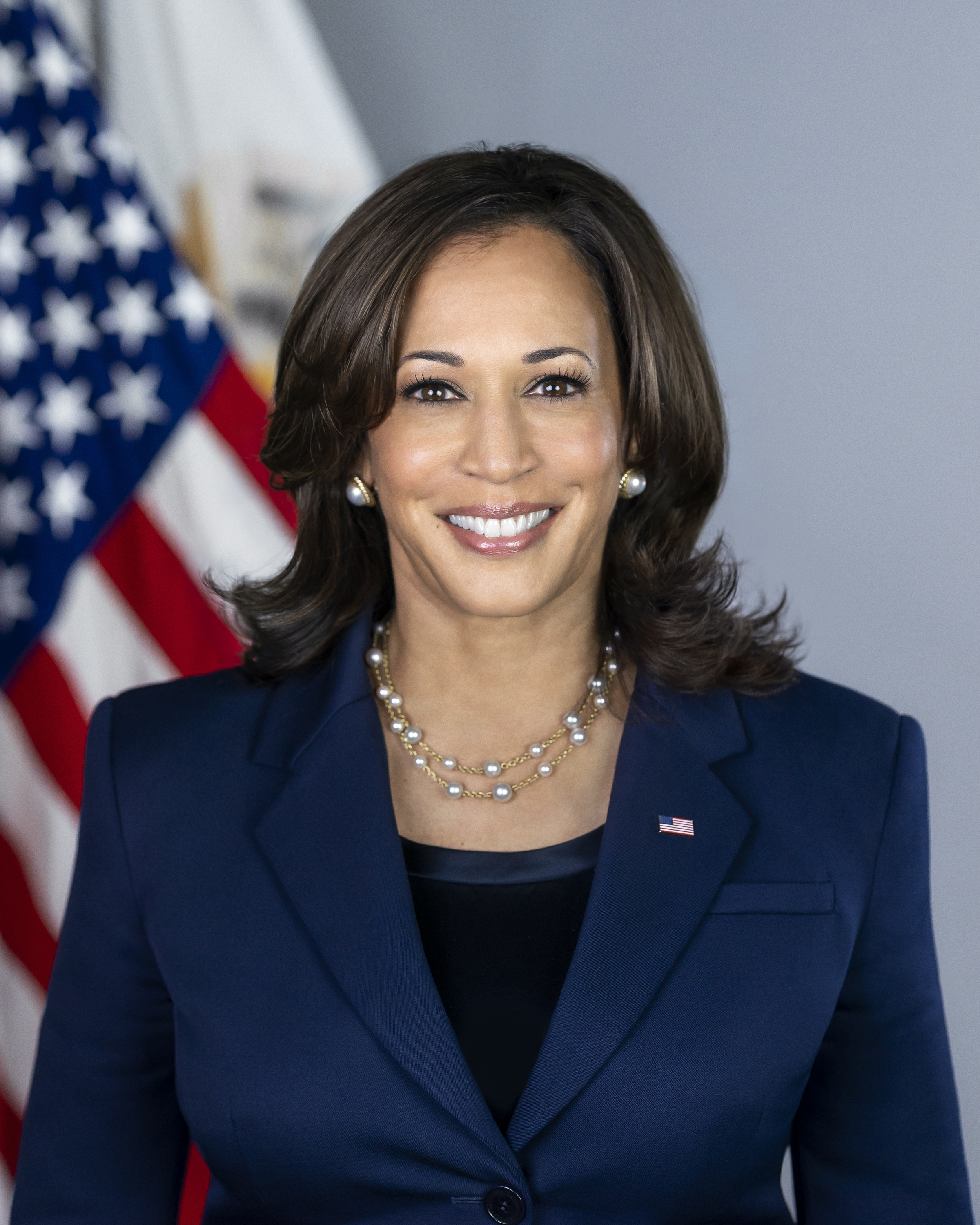
Kamala Harris

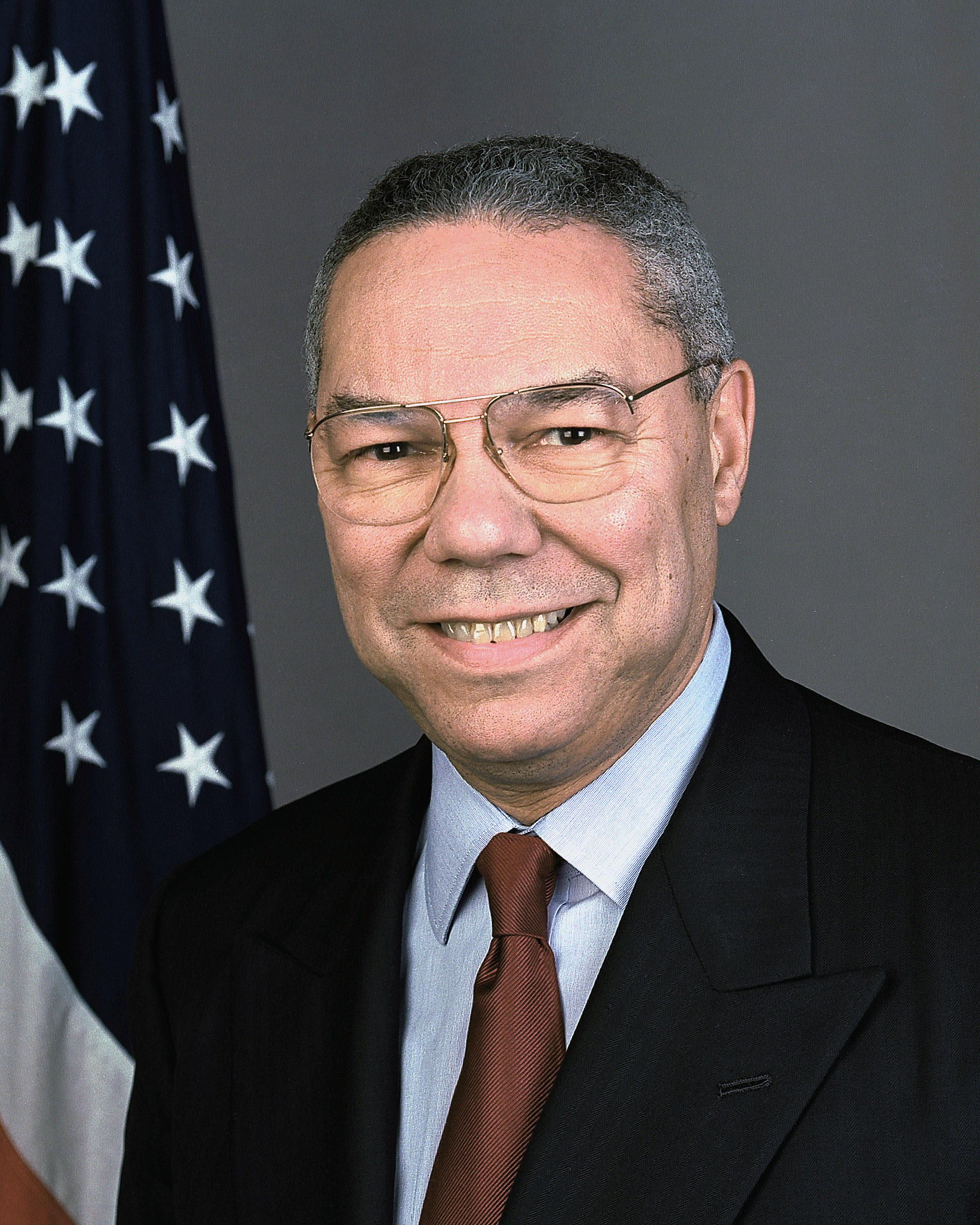
Colin Powell

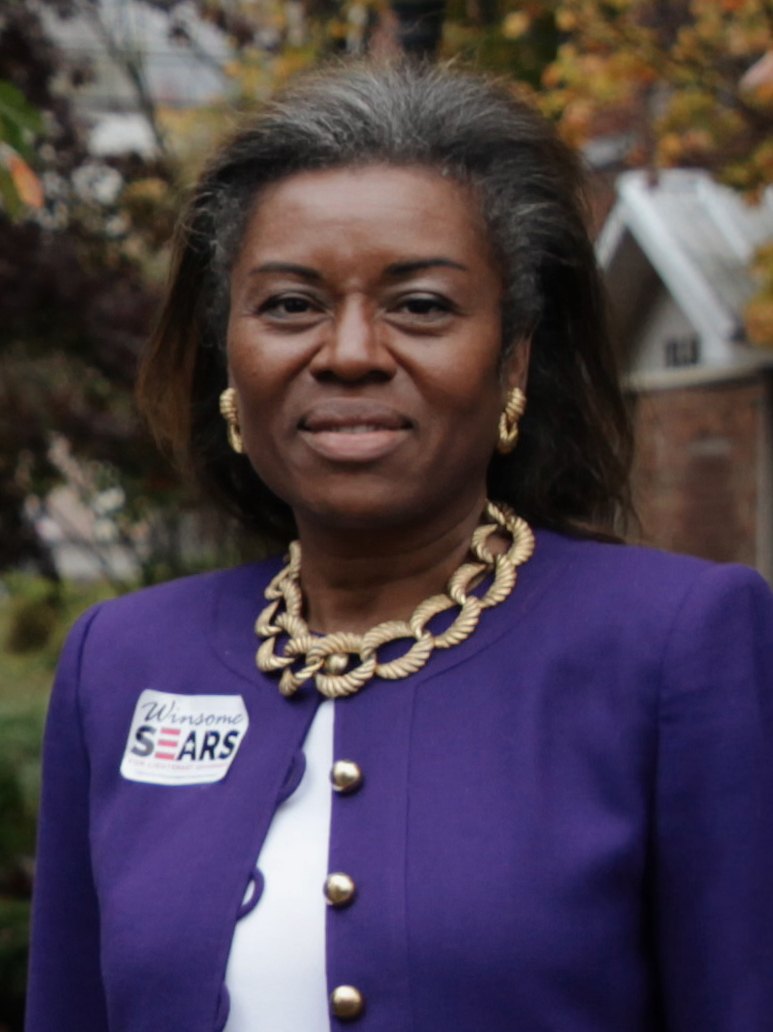
Winsome Earle-Sears

- Ronald Blackwood (1926–2017) – Mayor of Mount Vernon, New York (1985–1996), first elected black mayor in New York state
- Michael Blake – former vice chair of the Democratic National Committee (DNC)
- David Bowen – member of the Wisconsin State Assembly
- Anthony Brown – Democratic member of the U.S. House of Representatives
- Tanya Chutkan – judge of the United States District Court for the District of Columbia
- Kristen Clarke – Head of the U.S. Department of Justice Civil Rights Division, the first woman to hold the position
- Yvette Clarke – Democratic member of the U.S. House of Representatives
- Jacob De Cordova (1808–1868) – elected to the Texas House of Representatives. Founder of the Jamaica Gleaner
- Brian A. Cunningham – member of the New York State Assembly
- Alexander J. Dallas (1759–1817) – United States Secretary of the Treasury under President James Madison
- Jacob De Cordova – former member of the Texas House of Representatives
- Byron Donalds – Republican member of the U.S. House of Representatives
- Lisa Dunkley – member of the Florida House of Representatives
- Winsome Earle-Sears – former member of the Virginia House of Delegates. Lieutenant Governor of Virginia, the first female and woman of colour to hold the office
- Claudia L. Gordon – Associate director in the White House Office of Public Engagement. The first deaf person to work at the White House in a detailee capacity
- Denise D. Grant – City of Lauderhill Mayor
- Kamala Harris – Vice President of the United States; former U.S. Senator from California. The first African American vice president, the first female vice president and the highest-ranking female official in U.S. history
- Dale Holness – Broward County Commissioner and former Mayor of Broward County
- Sheila Jackson Lee – Democrat, U.S. representative for Texas's 18th congressional district
- Leondra Kruger – California Supreme Court Justice
- Donna McLeod – former member of the Georgia House of Representatives
- Wayne Messam – Mayor of Miramar, Florida
- Wes Moore – 63rd Governor of Maryland
- Shirley Nathan-Pulliam – former member of the Maryland State Senate and Maryland House of Delegates
- Anika Omphroy – member of the Florida House of Representatives
- Basil A. Paterson (1926–2014) – former Secretary of State of New York; father of David Paterson
- David Paterson – Governor of New York, the first African American to serve as governor of New York.
- N. Nick Perry – former U.S. Ambassador to Jamaica and member of the New York State Senate
- Colin Powell (1937–2021) – 65th United States Secretary of State, the first African American Secretary of State
- Michael Powell – former Chair of the Federal Communications Commission (FCC); son of Colin Powell
- Marcia Ranglin-Vassell – former member of the Rhode Island House of Representatives
- Kenneth Reeves – former Mayor of Cambridge, Massachusetts
- Pauline Rhodd-Cummings (1945–2002) – former member of the New York State Assembly, the first woman of Caribbean descent elected to the state Assembly
- Susan Rice – Director of the White House Domestic Policy Council
- Hazelle P. Rogers – Mayor of Lauderdale Lakes, Florida; former member of the Florida House of Representatives
- Edward A. Stevenson Sr. (1907–1980) – former member of the New York State Assembly, the first Caribbean American to serve in the Assembly
- Jheanelle Wilkins – member of the Maryland House of Delegates, the first black female ever elected to the district

=== Science and technology ===
- Evan Abel – endocrinologist, identified the link between adipose tissue glucose transporter (GLUT4) and insulin resistance
- Walt W. Braithwaite – engineer, led the development of computer-aided design/computer-aided manufacturing (CAD/CAM) systems at Boeing. Also made significant contributions to the development of the Initial Graphics Exchange Specification (IGES). Braithwaite's common data format and translators from Boeing were subsequently used as the basis for developing the IGES protocol.
- Nadine Burke Harris – California's first-ever Surgeon General. Pediatrician who linked traumatic childhood experiences and poor health
- Paul R. Cunningham – surgeon
- Ira Ferguson (1904–1992) – clinical psychologist
- Yvette Francis-McBarnette (1926–2016) – pioneering pediatrician, the first practitioner to use prophylactic antibiotics in the treatment of children with sickle cell. Second ever black woman to enrol at the Yale School of Medicine in 1946
- Neil Hanchard – physician and scientist, clinical investigator in the National Human Genome Research Institute
- Christopher Huie – Virgin Galactic astronaut and Senior Engineering Manager, Flight Sciences. Successfully completed Unity 25 space mission.
- Karen E. Nelson – microbiologist, published the first ever comprehensive human microbiome study
- Charles Palache (1869–1954) – mineralogist and crystallographer at Harvard University
- Robert Rashford – aerospace engineer and inventor, known for his work on spacecraft and the Hubble Space Telescope.
- Mercedes Richards (1955–2016) – pioneering scientist, the first astronomer to make images of the gravitational flow of gas between the stars in any interacting binary; the first to image the chromospheres and accretion disks in Algol binaries; the first in astronomy to apply the technique of tomography; the first astrophysicist to make theoretical hydrodynamic simulations of the Algol binary stars; the first astronomer to discover starspots on the cool star in an Algol binary and the first astrophysicist to apply novel distance correlation statistical methods to large astronomical databases
- John Thompson – computer programmer, invented the Lingo programming language used in Adobe Director

=== Sports ===
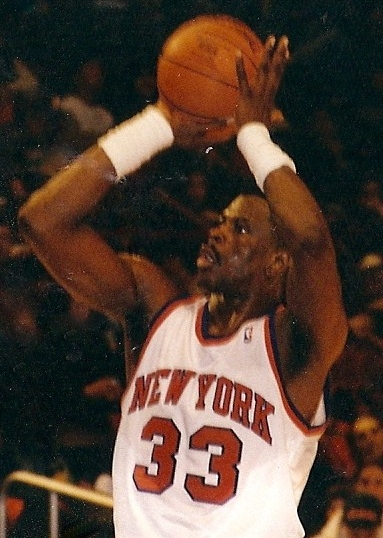
Patrick Ewing

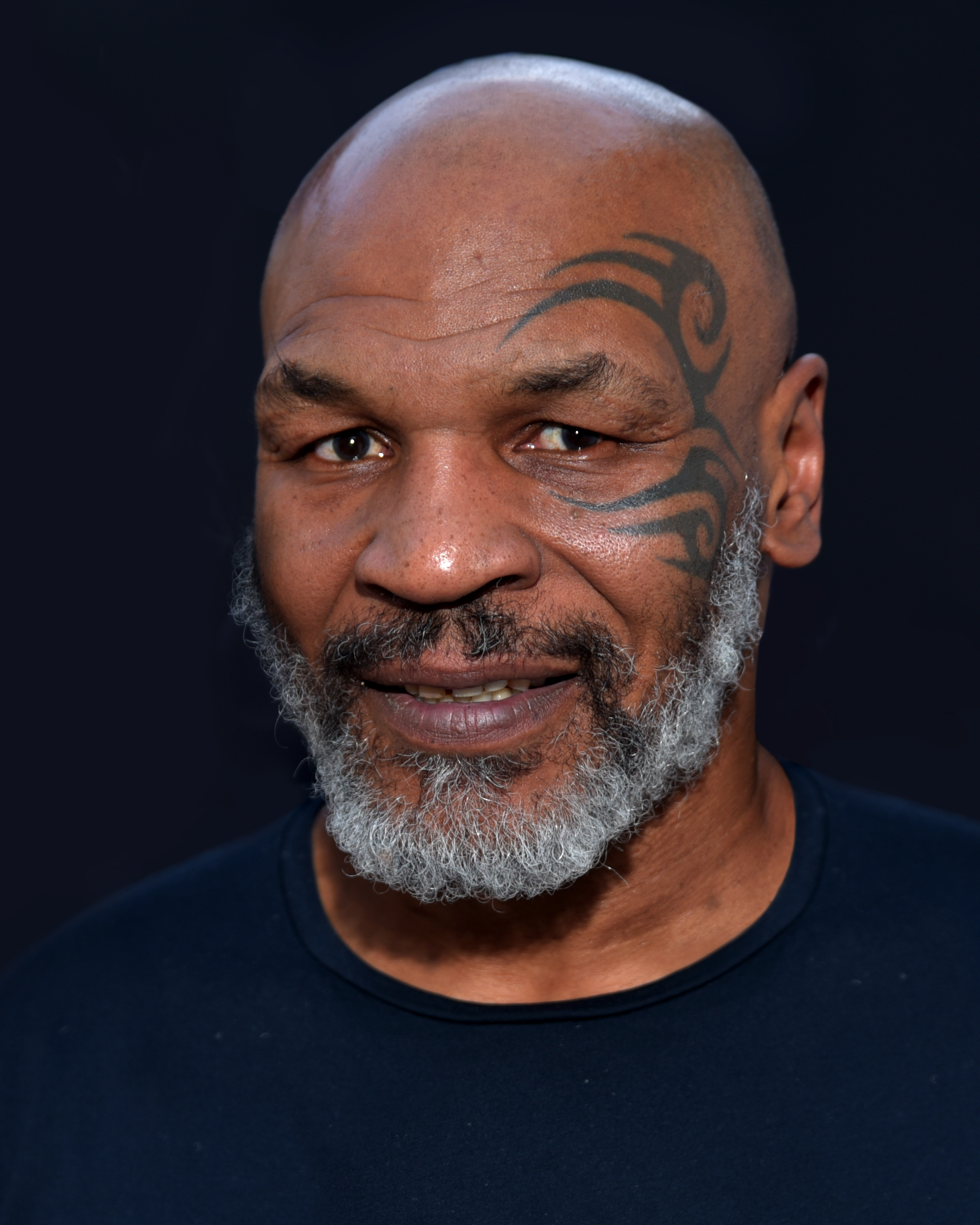
Mike Tyson

- Timroy Allen - cricketer
- Kyle Anderson - NBA basketball player
- Alicia Ashley - boxer, former WBC female world super bantamweight champion
- Corey Ballentine - football player
- Barrington Bartley - cricketer
- Claudine Beckford - cricketer
- Shaun Bridgmohan - jockey
- C. B. Bucknor - umpire in Major League Baseball
- Jade Cargill - professional wrestler and fitness model
- Patrick Chung - retired NFL football player
- Jeff Cunningham - former professional soccer player
- Chili Davis - baseball player, first ballplayer born in Jamaica to appear in an MLB game
- Kenrick Dennis(1966-2003) - cricketer
- Andre Drummond - NBA basketball player
- Patrick Ewing - retired basketball player who played with the New York Knicks
- Sandra Farmer-Patrick - athlete
- Heather Foster - professional bodybuilder
- Colin Fowles (1953-1985) - soccer player
- Robin Fraser - soccer coach and former player
- Ian Fray - soccer player
- Tony Gonzalez - retired NFL football player
- Ben Gordon - British-born Charlotte Bobcats basketball player
- Uriah Hall - professional mixed martial artist and former kickboxer
- Kwame Harris - footballer
- Sek Henry - basketball player
- Roy Hibbert - NBA basketball player
- Danielle Hunter - NFL football player
- Elmore Hutchinson - cricketer
- Kamara James (1984-2014) - Olympic fencer
- Andrew Kennedy - basketball player, 1996 Israeli Basketball Premier League MVP
- Big E Langston - professional wrestler, former WWE champion
- Brynton Lemar (born 1995) - American-born Jamaican basketball player for Hapoel Jerusalem of the Israeli Basketball Premier League
- Oscar Levis (1898–1983) – Negro league Jewish pitcher who was the first Jamaican-born player in a recognized major league
- Jonathan Lewis - soccer player
- Rajiv Maragh - jockey
- Floyd Mayweather Jr. - boxer, won world championships from super featherweight to light middleweight
- Justin Masterson - Major League baseball pitcher
- Joirdon Nicholas - Israeli Basketball Premier League player
- Matt Peart - footballer
- Norman Powell - NBA basketball player
- Suziann Reid - sprinter
- Sanya Richards-Ross - Olympic and World championship winning sprinter
- Sydney Schneider - footballer
- Errol Spence - championship winning professional boxer
- Aljamain Sterling - mixed martial arts fighter, UFC Bantamweight Champion
- Isaiah Stewart - NBA basketball player
- Ndamukong Suh - NFL football player
- Mike Tyson - retired boxer, former heavyweight champion
- Olivier Vernon - NFL football player
- Devon White - Major League Baseball player
- Tristan Thompson - basketball player
- Allyssa Lyn "Lacey" Lane - professional wrestler
- Tina Charles - basketball player, WBNA

=== Writers, poets and journalists ===
- Opal Palmer Adisa – award-winning writer, poet, performance artist
- Gil Bailey (1936-2020) – radio broadcaster, known as the "Godfather of Caribbean/Reggae Radio"
- Michelle Bernard – journalist, author
- Ruschell Boone (1975-2023) – Emmy award-winning journalist
- Colin Channer – writer
- Staceyann Chin – award-winning spoken-word poet and activist
- Michel du Cille (1956-2014) – Pulitzer prize winning photojournalist
- Michelle Cliff (1946-2016) – poet and author
- Wilfred Adolphus Domingo (1889-1968) – writer, journalist and activist
- Stacy-Ann Gooden – broadcaster and model
- Lester Holt – TV news anchor. The first Black male solo anchor for a major network newscast
- Marlon James – author, Man Booker Prize winner
- June Jordan (1936-2002) – award-winning poet, author and activist
- Shara McCallum – award-winning poet
- Claude McKay (1890-1948) – writer and poet, central figure in the Harlem Renaissance
- Gil Noble (1932-2012) – Emmy award-winning TV reporter, anchor and interviewer
- Patricia Powell – award-winning writer
- Joel Augustus Rogers (1880/83-1966) – journalist, author and historian
- Al Roker – TV weather anchor
- Louis Simpson (1923-2012) – Pulitzer prize winning poet
- Stephen A. Smith – sports journalist
- Frederick de Sola Mendes (1850-1927) – author and editor
- Ekwueme Michael Thelwell – award-winning novelist and essayist
- Jenna Wolfe – journalist and personal trainer
- Fiona Zedde – fiction writer

=== Others ===
- Janeshia Adams-Ginyard – actress, stunt woman and professional wrestler
- Maurice Ashley – chess grandmaster
- King Bach – Internet personality, actor, composer, rapper and comedian
- Tyson Beckford – model and actor
- Cedella Booker (1926–2008) – singer, writer, mother of Bob Marley
- Amos H. Carnegie (1886–1978) – Baptist minister
- Desus Nice – comedian
- Louis Farrakhan – leader of the Nation of Islam
- Colin Ferguson – mass murderer
- Tanya Hamilton – film director and producer
- Donna Hylton – convict and author
- Barrington Irving – pilot who previously held the record for the youngest person to pilot a plane around the world solo. The first black person to accomplish this feat
- Peter Wayne Lewis – contemporary artist
- Isaac P. Mendes (1853–1904) – Jamaican-born rabbi who led Congregation Mickve Israel in Savannah, Georgia
- CJ Pearson – conservative contributor
- Angella Reid – White House Chief Usher, the first woman to hold the position
- Shawn Rhoden (1975–2021) – professional bodybuilder
- Ryan Shakes – social media personality, and actor
- Ted Shearer (1919–1992) – advertising art director and cartoonist
- Toni-Ann Singh – beauty queen who won Miss World 2019
- Alexis Skyy – reality television personality
- Marsha Thomason – British-born actress
- Dexter Williams – Miramar police chief

== See also ==
- List of Jamaicans
- List of Jamaican British people
- Jamaican Canadian
- Marcus Garvey
