= Jason Hill =

Jason Hill may refer to:

- Jason Hill (golfer) (born 1971), American professional golfer
- Jason Hill (American football) (born 1985), American football wide receiver
- Jason Hill (singer) (active 1998 and after), American singer and producer
- Jason Hill (rugby union) (born 1990), English-born Scottish rugby union player
- Jason Hill (gardener), pseudonym under which the physicist Dr. Frank Anthony Hampton wrote gardening books, see Edward Augustus Bowles
- Jason D. Hill, American professor of philosophy

== See also ==
- Hill (surname)
