= Ruth Lubic =

American nurse midwife (born 1927)

- Born: January 18, 1927 (age 99)
- Education: Hospital of the University of Pennsylvania, Teachers College, Columbia University
- Medical career
- Awards: Hattie Hemschemeyer Award; Gustav O. Lienhard Award; MacArthur Fellowship; Florence Nightingale Medal

Ruth Watson Lubic, CNM, EdD, FAAN, FACNM, (born January 18, 1927) is an American nurse-midwife and applied anthropologist who pioneered the role of nurse-midwives as primary care providers for women, particularly in maternity care. Lubic is considered to be one of the leaders of the nurse-midwifery movement in the United States.

Lubic holds an RN diploma (1955) from Hospital of the University of Pennsylvania, a certificate in nurse-midwifery (1962) from the Maternity Center Association (MCA), and a BS in nursing (1959), MA in medical/surgical nursing (1961), and EdD in Applied Anthropology (1979) from Teachers College, Columbia University. Lubic has also been awarded honorary doctorates from six universities.

Lubic co-founded two legally sanctioned, freestanding birth centers in New York City: the Childbearing Center (1975), which served middle-class families of Upper East Side Manhattan, and the Morris Heights Childbearing Center (1988), which served the lower-income families of the South Bronx. By focusing on providing safe and family-centered maternity care, education, and services, these birth centers served as effective alternatives to institutionalized obstetric care. In 1993, Lubic became the first nurse to receive the MacArthur Fellowship, the “Genius Grant,” which included a $375,000 prize. Lubic utilized the $375,000 grant to found her third birth center, the Family Health and Birth Center in the collaborative of the Developing Families Center in Washington, D.C. (2000), where the maternal and infant mortality rates were the highest in the United States. The Family Health and Birth Center has had a significant impact in Washington, D.C., as demonstrated by the decreased rates of cesarean sections, preterm births, and low birth weight newborns when compared to those of the city's. The center has also saved the city's health care system an estimated cost of over $1 million each year.

Lubic has been widely recognized for her work as a nurse-midwife. She was the 1983 recipient of the Hattie Hemschemeyer Award from the American College of Nurse-Midwives, the 2001 recipient of the Gustav O. Lienhard Award from the National Academy of Medicine, and one of the 2001 Living Legend honorees from the American Academy of Nursing. She is currently Founder and President Emerita of the Developing Families Center and Founder of the Family Health and Birth Center.

== Early life and education ==
Lubic was born in Bristol, Pennsylvania to John Russell Watson and Lillian Watson (née Kraft) and raised as the second of two daughters. John was a third-generation pharmacist who owned and managed Watson's Drug Store alongside his wife, and Lubic spent much of her childhood there assisting with everyday duties and chores. Following the death of her father in 1942, and with her older sister in college, Lubic managed the drugstore full-time with her mother while completing her schooling.

At age 25, Lubic began her education and training in a diploma nursing program in 1952 at the Hospital of the University of Pennsylvania, where she was elected student body president. That same year, she was introduced to William Lubic, a Columbia University and University of Pennsylvania Law School graduate and New York lawyer, whom she later married in 1955. Shortly after her marriage, Lubic graduated with her RN diploma and was recognized as the recipient of the Letitia White Award for Highest Academic Average and the Florence Nightingale Medal for Excellence in Nursing Practice.

Following her graduation, Lubic moved to New York and began working at the Memorial Hospital for Cancer and Allied Diseases (now the Memorial Sloan Kettering Cancer Center) as a staff nurse and, later, as a head nurse until 1958. Lubic continued her education concurrently through courses at Hunter College to work towards a bachelor's degree in nursing, which she pursued part-time for three years before resuming her education full-time at Teachers College (TC), Columbia University. She graduated with her bachelor's degree in nursing in 1959 and, after a short break during which she had her first child, Douglas Lubic, she received her master's degree in medical/surgical nursing in 1961 from TC.

== Nurse-midwifery career ==
Lubic's entrance into the field of nurse-midwifery began in 1959 with the birth of her son and her unconventional (for the time) delivery experience, which she considered to be one of the most pivotal moments in her life. Her obstetrician, Edward Cullee Mann, permitted Lubic's husband to remain in the labor-delivery room for the duration of her labor and birth; Mann gave both Lubic and her husband time to bond with the newborn immediately after the delivery without any healthcare staff present. Mann later encouraged Lubic to pursue a career as a nurse-midwife through the midwifery training program at Maternity Center Association (MCA). Lubic completed her certificate in nurse-midwifery in 1962.

After attaining her nurse-midwifery certificate, Lubic became a member of the American College of Nurse-Midwives (ACNM), where she was a program committee member in 1962, the chair of local chapters in 1963, the vice president from 1964 to 1966, and the president-elect in 1969. Collaborating with the ACNM president and board, Lubic, her husband, and Martin Ginsburg helped to establish the ACNM Foundation in 1967. In 1963, Lubic accepted a position with the MCA and worked as a parent educator and counselor until 1967. Influenced by her student experience working with lower-income Latino and African-American families, Lubic began working on her Doctor of Education degree in applied anthropology in 1967 at TC. This decision was also influenced by Lubic's friend, Lambros Comitas, an anthropologist at TC who emphasized to Lubic the importance of understanding how culture affected health and healthcare decision-making. Lubic completed her doctoral studies in 1970. Her dissertation, “Barriers and Conflict in Maternity Care Innovation,” was completed in 1979.

Another pivotal moment in Lubic's life and career began with her appointment as the General Director of the MCA in 1970, a position she would hold for 25 years until 1995. As General Director, Lubic championed for the provision of an alternative to the institutionalized, medical model of birth that was prevalent during the time. Lubic believed that more autonomous, family-centered maternity care and services provided by nurse-midwives could better meet the needs of low-risk expectant individuals and their families. Lubic advocated for the role of nurse-midwives as providers of prenatal care, birth, and postpartum care and believed that freestanding birth centers served as a safe, comprehensive, and less costly option to both hospital births and home births. The need to address and provide alternatives to institutionalized obstetric care also came during a time when the intersection of different sociocultural and sociopolitical movements of the 1970s, like the feminist and the women's health movements, greatly influenced perceptions of the medical model of health care. There was a general mistrust in physicians and hospital institutions and substantial criticism of and dissatisfaction with the lack of individualized and personalized care with hospital births.

In 1971, Lubic worked with the MCA, nurse-midwife Kitty Ernst, and obstetrician John Franklin to establish Booth Maternity Center in Philadelphia, Pennsylvania, which was previously known as the Booth Maternity Hospital. Booth Maternity Hospital was originally founded in 1962 and operated by The Salvation Army. Lubic continued her collaboration with the MCA and Ernst to create refresher-course, nurse-midwifery programs at Booth, the University of Mississippi, and the SUNY Downstate Medical Center.

Lubic's prominent role and work in the field of nurse-midwifery resulted in her election to the Institute of Medicine of the National Academy of Sciences as a member of the first class in 1971. In 1973, she was invited to join the first United States medical delegation to the People's Republic of China in 1973. She was the only woman and the only nurse in the delegation team.

Under the direction of Lubic and the MCA Board of Directors, the Childbearing Center (CbC) was established in 1975, becoming the first of the MCA's freestanding birth centers offering maternity care led by nurse-midwives. The center offered comprehensive and safe maternity care which included prenatal care and education, comfortable birthing rooms and spaces for laboring individuals, low medical intervention birthing practices, postnatal and infant care education, postpartum care, follow-up postpartum home visits, and policies that permitted the attendance of any support person for the laboring individual to ensure an emotionally and socially supportive birthing experience. The CbC was staffed with a multidisciplinary care team consisting of part-time obstetricians, part-time pediatricians, and full-time nurse-midwives; however, the majority of the care was provided primarily by nurse-midwives who were present on the staff at a ratio of 3 nurse-midwives to every 1 physician.

The center faced significant challenges after its establishment due to opposition from the medical community and difficulty acquiring Blue Cross and Medicaid reimbursements. Lubic herself became a central recipient of personal and professional criticism due to her advocacy for nurse-midwife-managed birth centers. Despite the challenges and controversy that accompanied the opening of the CbC, increasing support for freestanding birth centers nationwide coincided with a 1981 Federal Trade Commission report which determined that the CbC was safely and effectively providing maternity care for low-risk expectant individuals.

In 1983, Lubic collaborated again with Ernst to found the National Association of Childbearing Centers, previously the Cooperative Birth Center Network and now known as the American Association of Birth Centers. It provides operating information and certification programs for birth centers.

Because the CbC served primarily middle-class and some upper-class white families in Upper East Side Manhattan, Lubic aimed to bring the same model of more autonomous, low-cost, family-centered maternity care to low-income, marginalized communities. Lubic learned that providing safe and effective maternity care to low-income communities could help empower these families by providing the resources and access to services that would allow pregnant individuals to have greater agency in their health and maternity care. In 1988, in collaboration with the Morris Heights Health Center, Lubic and the MCA established the second MCA freestanding birth center, the Childbearing Center of Morris Heights in South Bronx. This center primarily served low-income, African-American and Puerto Rican families of the South Bronx, where the infant mortality rates were the second highest in the United States. To empower these families, Lubic advocated for the center to permit expectant individuals to have direct access to their patient charts and encouraged them to check their blood pressure and weight, test their urine for prenatal lab tests, and document the information/data in their own charts.

In 1993, Lubic was awarded the MacArthur Fellowship “Genius Grant,” which included a $375,000 prize to be disbursed as a $75,000 annual stipend over a period of five years. Lubic utilized the grant to start and fund work on her third freestanding birth center in 1994. To better commit to this project, Lubic left her position as MCA General Director in 1995. During this time, CbC stopped operations and closed down while the CbC of Morris Heights continued to provide services to families as the Women's Health and Birthing Pavilion and, now, as the Women's Health Pavilion (the birthing center is no longer operating).

Lubic moved to Washington, D.C., in 1994 to begin her work in Ward 5, where the maternal and infant mortality rates were the highest in the United States. To address these health disparities through a family-centered care model, Lubic founded her third birth center, the Family Health and Birth Center (FHBC), as part of the Developing Families Center (DFC) to provide care and resources to empower low-income families and promote community well-being. The DFC was established in 2000 as an “umbrella” organization with three non-profit partner organizations, the FHBC, the Healthy Babies Project, and the Nation's Capital Child and Family Development. The DFC offered a variety of comprehensive services and resources to provide access to primary care, maternity and newborn care, social services, childcare, and early childhood development services.

As a result of the DFC's work in Washington, D.C., birth outcomes have improved and the rates for preterm births, low birth weight newborns, and cesarean sections have decreased when compared to respective rates in D.C. The cost-effective services provided at the DFC has also contributed to a savings of $1,153,051 annually for the healthcare system.

Since 2010, the FHBC has operated as the Community of Hope Family Health and Birth Center and continues to provide nurse-midwife-led maternity care, well-woman care, and primary care as well as social services and early childhood development services, which were previously provided by the Healthy Babies Project and the Nation's Capital Child and Family Development and are now offered by the Edward C. Mazique Parent Child Center.

Lubic currently serves as founder and president emerita of the Developing Families Center and Founder of the Family Health and Birth Center. Lubic's papers can be found at the Barbara Bates Center for the Study of the History of Nursing, University of Pennsylvania, School of Nursing.

== Awards and recognition ==
- 1955: Letitia White Award for Highest Academic Average, School of Nursing at the Hospital of the University of Pennsylvania
- 1955: Florence Nightingale Medal for Excellence in Nursing Practice, School of Nursing at the Hospital of the University of Pennsylvania
- 1959: Election to Pi Lambda Theta, Academic Honor Society
- 1971: Elected Member, Institute of Medicine, National Academy of Sciences
- 1978: Election to Sigma Theta Tau, National Honor Society of Nursing
- 1978, Fellow, American Academy of Nursing
- 1980: Teachers College, Columbia University Nursing Hall of Fame Inductee and TC Achievement Award for Nursing Practice
- 1981: Jane Delano Distinguished Service Award, New York Counties Registered Nurses Association
- 1981: Rockefeller Public Service Award, Woodrow Wilson School of Public and International Affairs, Princeton University
- 1982: Fellow, American Association for the Advancement of Science
- 1983: Hattie Hemschemeyer Award, American College of Nurse-Midwives
- 1985: Doctor of Laws Honoris Causa, University of Pennsylvania
- 1986: Doctor of Science Honoris Causa, University of Medicine and Dentistry of New Jersey
- 1987: Fellow, Society for Applied Anthropology
- 1989: R. Louise McManus Award, Nursing Education Alumni Association of Teachers College, Columbia University
- 1991: Visiting Fellow, King Edward Memorial Hospital for Women, Perth, Australia
- 1991: Kate Hanna Harvey Visiting professor, France Payne Bolton School of Nursing, Case Western Reserve University
- 1992: Teachers College Distinguished Alumni Award
- 1992: Doctor of Humane Letters, Honoris Causa, The College of New Rochelle
- 1993: Doctor of Science, Honoris Causa, SUNY Health Sciences Center at Brooklyn
- 1993: Fellow, The John D. and Catherine T. MacArthur Foundation
- 1994: Doctor of Humane Letters, Honoris Causa, Pace University
- 1994: Honorary Recognition Award, American Nurses Association
- 1994: Lillian D. Wald Spirit of Nursing Award, Visiting Nurse Service of New York
- 1994-1995: Consultant, Division of Nursing, Bureau of Health Professions Health Resources and Services Administration, Public Health Service, United States Department of Health and Human Services
- 1995-1997: Expert Consultant, Office of Public Health and Science, United States Department of Health and Human Services
- 1996: Sigma Theta Tau Pace Setter
- 1997: MCA Award, Maternity Center Association
- 1999: Women of Distinction Award, National Association for Advancing Women in Higher Education
- 1999: Irving Harris Visiting Scholar, College of Nursing, University of Illinois
- 2001: Gustav O. Lienhard Award, National Academy of Medicine
- 2001: Special Recognition Award, Alumni Society of the School of Nursing of the Hospital of the University of Pennsylvania
- 2001: Election to Honorary Membership, Alpha Omega Alpha medical honor society
- 2001: Designation as a Living Legend, American Academy of Nursing
- 2003: Lillian D. Wald Award, Visiting Nurse Service of New York
- 2004: Centennial Medal, The College of New Rochelle 100th Anniversary Dinner Dance
- 2004: Hugh P. Davis Lectureship, Nell Hodgson Woodruff School of Nursing, Emory University
- 2005: Jamie E. Bolane Award for Lifetime Achievement, NACC Foundation (National Association of Childbearing Centers, now the American Association of Birth Centers)
- 2006: Martha May Eliot Award, American Public Health Association
- 2007: Invited Speaker House of Representatives Hearing on Infant Mortality
- 2008: Visionary Award, Morris Heights Health Center
- 2008: Chapter I Honorary Lifetime Chapter Membership, American College of Nurse-Midwives
- 2008: LEAP Award, Morris Heights Health Center
- 2009: Doctor of Science, Honoris Causa, University of Massachusetts College of Medicine at Worcester
- 2009: Irving Harris Visiting professor, Department of Women, Children and Family Health Sciences, School of Nursing, University of Illinois
- 2009: Edna L. Fritz Lecturer, College of Nursing, Ohio State University
- 2010: Foremother Lifetime Achievement Award, National Center for Health Research
- 2010: Senior Midwives Award, UNFPA (United Nations Population Fund) Symposium on Strengthening Midwifery
- 2011: Honorary Doctorate, Frontier Nursing University
- 2018: Urban Health Equity Champion, New York Academy of Medicine

== Selected publications ==
- Lubic, R.W. (1962). Nursing care after adrenalectomy or hypophysectomy. The American Journal of Nursing, 62(4), 84–86.
- Lubic, R.W. (1969). The Puerto Rican family. The Journal of Nurse-Midwifery & Women’s Health, 14(4), 104–110.
- Lubic, R.W. (1972). The nurse-midwife joins the obstetrical team. Journal of Midwifery & Women’s Health, 17(3), 73–77.
- Lubic, R.W. (1972). What the lay person expects of maternity care: Are we meeting these expectations? Journal of Obstetric, Gynecologic, & Neonatal Nursing, 1(1), 25–31.
- Lubic, R.W. (1974). If elitism is the answer, what is the question?. The Journal of Nurse-Midwifery & Women’s Health, 19(2), 9–11.
- Lubic, R.W. (1974). Myths about Nurse-Midwifery. The American Journal of Nursing, 74(2), 268–269.
- Lubic, R.W. (1974). Statement of Maternity Center Association before the House Committee on Ways and Means. The Journal of Nurse-Midwifery & Women’s Health, 19(3), 11–16.
- Lubic, R.W. (1975). Developing maternity services women will trust. The American Journal of Nursing, 75(10), 1685–1688.
- Lubic, R.W. (1976). Alternative patterns of nurse-midwifery care: I. The childbearing center. Journal of Nurse-Midwifery, 21(3), 24–25.
- Lubic, R.W., & Ernst, E.K. (1978). The childbearing center: an alternative to conventional care. Nursing Outlook, 26(12), 754–760.
- Lubic, R.W. (1979). Barriers and conflict in maternity care innovation. Ann Arbor, Michigan: University Microfilms International.
- Faison, J.B., Pisani, B.J., Douglas, R.G., Cranch, G.S., Lubic, R.W. (1979). The childbearing center: An alternative birth setting. Obstetrics and Gynecology, 54(4), 527–532.
- Lubic, R.W. (1979). The impact of technology on health care—The Childbearing Center: A case for technology's appropriate use. Journal of Midwifery & Women’s Health, 24(1), 6–10.
- Bennetts, A.B., & Lubic, R.W. (1982). The free-standing birth centre. The Lancet, 319(8268), 378–380.
- Lubic, R.W. (1982). Nurse-midwifery education—The second 50 years. Journal of Midwifery & Women’s Health, 27(5), 4–9.
- Lubic, R.W. (1983). Childbirthing centers: delivering more for less. The American Journal of Nursing, 83(7), 1053–1056.
- Lubic, R.W. (1985). Reimbursement for nursing practice: Lessons learned, experiences shared. Nursing & Health Care, 6(1), 22–25.
- Lubic. R.W. (1986). The proposed New York state legislation on midwifery. Journal of Midwifery & Women’s Health, 31(3), 150–152.
- Lubic, R.W., & Hawes, G.R. (1987). Childbearing: A book of choices. New York: McGraw-Hill.
- Lubic. R.W. (1988). Insights from life in the trenches. Nursing Outlook, 36(2), 62–65.
- Lubic. R. W. (1989). The midwife as an agent of change. Australian College of Midwives Incorporated Journal, 2(2), 6–7.
- Lubic, R.W. (1990). The alternative or the norm for the future?. Women and Birth, 3(2), 6–14.
- Lubic, R.W. (1997). Drive-by deliveries: A missed opportunity. Public Health Reports, 112(4), 284–287.
- Lubic, R.W. (1997). Principles for a successful professional life. Journal of Midwifery & Women’s Health, 42(1), 53–58.
- Lubic, R.W., & Flynn, C. (2010). The family health and birth center—A nurse-midwife-managed center in Washington, DC. Alternative Therapies in Health and Medicine, 16(5), 58–60.
