= Opal Palmer Adisa =

Jamaican and American novelist (born 1954)

- Born: 6 November 1954 (age 71) near Kingston, Jamaica
- Education: University of California at Berkeley; San Francisco State University; Hunter College
- Occupations: Writer; poet; university director
- Children: Shola Adisa-Farrar, Teju Adisa-Farrar, Jawara Adisa-Farrar
- Writing career
- Genres: Caribbean literature, creative writing, theatre
- Website: www.opalpalmeradisa.com

Opal Palmer Adisa (born 6 November 1954) is a Jamaican and American poet, novelist, performance artist and educator. Anthologized in more than 400 publications, she has been a regular performer of her work internationally. Professor Emeritus at California College of the Arts, Adisa is also the current Director of the Institute for Gender and Development Studies at the University of the West Indies, Mona Campus in Jamaica, where she currently resides.

== Early life ==
Adisa was raised ten miles outside Kingston, Jamaica, and attended school in the capital. In 1970 she went to study at Hunter College, New York, and in 1979 moved to the San Francisco Bay Area to pursue an MA in creative writing. As noted by David Katz, "Adisa’s work has been greatly informed by her childhood experience of life on a sugar estate in the Jamaican countryside, where her father worked as a chemist and her mother as a bookkeeper. It was in this setting that young Opal was introduced not only to the art of storytelling, but also, after her parents divorced, to the ceaseless oppression faced by women and the ongoing injustices heaped on the poor. Such formative experiences, coupled with her mother’s efforts to improve the lives of those around her, gave Adisa the desire to “give voice to the voiceless” at an early age."

== Work and writing ==
Opal Palmer Adisa has two master's degrees from San Francisco State University, and a PhD from the University of California at Berkeley. She has previously taught undergraduate and graduate courses at California College of the Arts, Stanford University, University of Berkeley, and San Francisco State University. From 1993 to 2017, Adisa taught writing and literature, and served as Chair of the Ethnic Studies/Cultural Diversity Program at the California College of Arts and Crafts in Oakland. In the spring of 2010, she was visiting professor and editor at the University of the Virgin Islands (UVI), St. Croix Campus, and for two years she edited The Caribbean Writer, UVI’s famous journal of Caribbean literature. In September 2017, she was appointed to the position of Director of the Institute for Gender and Development Studies at the University of the West Indies in Mona, Jamaica, where she currently resides. In 2018, Adisa was awarded Professor Emeritus status, in honor of her 25 years of contributions to California College of the Arts and in her field.

An important element of her poetry is the use of nation language, about which she has said: "I have to credit Louise Bennett for granting me permission, so to speak, to write in Nation Language, because it was her usage that allowed me to see the beauty of our language. Moreover, there are just some things that don’t have the same sense of intimacy or color if not said in Nation language.... I use nation language when it is the only way and the best way to get my point across, to say what I mean from the center of my navel. But I also use it, to interrupt and disrupt standard English as s reminder to myself that I have another tongue, but also to jolt readers to listen and read more carefully, to glean from the language the Caribbean sensibilities that I am always pushing, sometimes subtly, other times more forcefully. Nation language allows me to infuse the poem with all of the smells and colors of home."

== Artists residencies ==
- Writer-in-Residence, Binational Fulbright Institute, Cairo, Egypt, December–February 2007
- Writer-in-Residence, Sacatar Institute, Itaparica, Bahia, Brazil, December–March 2006
- Writer-in-Residence, McColl Center for Art + Innovation, Laurel Hill, NC, March 2001
- Writer-in-Residence, McColl Center for Art + Innovation, Charlotte, NC, September–December 2000
- Writer-in-Residence, Headlands Center for the Arts, Sausalito, CA, February–December 1996.

== Awards ==
- Council for a performance of "Daughters of Yam", with Devorah Major
- Pushcart Prize for the short story "Duppy Get Her", 1987
- PEN Oakland/Josephine Miles Literary Award for Tamarind and Mango Women, 1992
- Writer in Residence for Wadastick Artists & Scholars at Laurel Hill, North Carolina
- Writer in Residence for the McColl Center for Visual Art in Charlotte, NC
- Distinguished Writer for the Middle Atlantic Writers Association
- Creative Work Fund Grant for West Oakland Senior Citizen Oral History Project, San Francisco, CA
- Nominated International Woman of the Year International Biography Center, England
- Canute A. Brodhurst Prize for "The Brethren", in The Caribbean Writer, University of the Virgin Islands, St Croix
- Writer-in-Residence, Headlands Center for the Arts, Sausaulito, California
- Daily News Prize for best poems in The Caribbean Writer, University of the Virgin Islands, St Croix
- Master Folk Artist for Storytelling, California Arts Council
- Distinguished Bay Area Woman Writer Award/California Legislative Assembly Certificate of presented by the National Women's Political Caucus
- Master Folk Artist for Storytelling, California Arts Council
- Creative Work Fund Grant for West Oakland Senior Citizen Oral History Project, San Francisco, California
- Creative Artist Fellowship Award for Storytelling, Cultural Funding Program, City of Oakland

== Bibliography ==
=== Novels and short story collections ===
- Bake-Face and Other Guava Stories (1986), short story collection
- It Begins With Tears (1997), novel
- Until Judgement Comes (2007), short story collection
- Painting Away Regrets (2011), novel
- Love's Promise (2017), short story collection, including "The Living Roots" (2004)

=== Poetry collections ===
- Traveling Women (1989, with Devorah Major)
- Fierce Love (1992, including jazz recording with Devorah Major)
- Tamarind and Mango Women (1992)
- Leaf-of-Life (2000)
- The Tongue Is a Drum (2002, including jazz CD with Devorah Major)
- Caribbean Passion (2004)
- Eros Muse (2006)
- I Name Me Name (2008)
- Conscious Living (2009)
- Amour Verdinia (2009)
- What a Woman Is (2010, including paintings by Shyam Kamel)
- Incantations & Rites (2013, with Devorah Major)
- 4-Headed Woman (2013)

=== Children’s books ===
- Pina, The Many-Eyed Fruit (1985)
- Playing Is Our Work (2008)
- Look! A Moko Jumbie (2016)

=== Anthologies ===
- Disaster Matters: Disasters Matter, Edited by Yvonne Weekes, Wendy McMahon (House of Nehesi Publishers, 2021)
- Caribbean Erotic (2010, co-edited with Donna Aza Weir-Soley)

=== Other/Editor ===
- Interviewing the Caribbean: “Caribbean Life + Olympian Feats, Volume 3 part 2” (online journal), Spring 2018
- Interviewing the Caribbean: “Caribbean Life + Olympian Feats, Volume 3 part 1” (online journal), Winter 2017
- Interviewing the Caribbean: “Violence in the Caribbean, Volume 2” (online journal), Spring 2017
- Interviewing the Caribbean: “Violence in the Caribbean, Volume 1” (online journal), Fall 2016
- Interviewing the Caribbean: “Intellectual Property” (online journal), Fall 2015
- ProudFlesh, Riding The Waves of Caribbean Women (poetry, prose, essays and art) Issue 8, 2013
- The Caribbean Writer: Ayiti/Haiti, Volume 25 (journal of poetry, prose, personal narrative, interview and book reviews; translated into French), 2011
- The Caribbean Writer, Volume 24 (journal of poetry, prose and essays), 2010

== See also ==
- List of Jamaican Americans
- Jamaican literature
