= Joe Johns =

American journalist

- Born: Joseph Eduardo Johns
- Education: Marshall University (BA); American University (JD)
- Occupation(s): Lawyer, Journalist

Joseph Eduardo Johns is an American lawyer and journalist. He is the Senior Washington Correspondent for CNN, based in the Washington, D.C., bureau. He was promoted to the position in 2014. He previously worked as an NBC News Capitol Hill Correspondent for TODAY and other NBC programs. He worked for WRC-TV (NBC-4) in Washington, D.C. He also worked as an anchor for WSAZ-TV in 1980.

In an interview with Capitol Standard magazine in 2016, Johns said of the lessons he's learned in media: "Be skeptical of hype. People who tell big lies don’t back down, even when confronted with the truth."

Johns was a star discus thrower at West High School in Columbus, Ohio. He was a four-year scholarship track and field athlete at Marshall University and was inducted into the Marshall University Athletics Hall of Fame in 2003. He holds a bachelor of arts degree in political science from Marshall University in Huntington, West Virginia, where he graduated Omicron Delta Kappa, and a J.D. degree from American University in D.C.

Johns was married to former MSNBC analyst Michelle Bernard; the couple divorced in 2008.
