= Marcia V. Keizs =

Dr. Marcia V. Keizs, is the sixth President of York College, Jamaica, in the borough of Queens in New York City. She is a native of Kingston, Jamaica and has lived and worked in New York City since 1968.

After graduating from high school in Kingston, she attended the University of Manitoba in Winnipeg, Manitoba, Canada (B.A. 1967), and Teachers College, Columbia University (M.A. 1971). She holds an Ed.D. from Teachers College, Columbia University (1984) and a certificate in educational management from the Harvard Graduate School of Education (1995).

Keizs has pursued a career in higher education; first as a professor of English at Queensborough Community College/City University of New York (CUNY), where she taught the full range of course offerings, including Afro-American Literature. She was the assistant director in the acclaimed External Education Degree Program for the Homebound Student, which provides the opportunity for severely disabled students to earn a college degree without leaving home. From 1984 to 1988, Keizs worked at LaGuardia Community College/CUNY where she achieved the title of assistant dean for external affairs, labor relations, and personnel. From 1988 to 1994, Keizs was vice president and dean of student services at Queensborough Community College with a one-year stint as acting vice chancellor for student affairs of CUNY.

Keizs has also served as the acting president within the CUNY system. Her service included Borough of Manhattan Community College, September 1994 to August 1995, and York College, January 5, 1996 to August 1996.

Keizs served as the vice president of academic affairs at Bronx Community College/CUNY from October 1, 1997 to February 13, 2005. During her tenure as Bronx Community College vice president of academic affairs, Keizs strengthened the college’s academic programs by expanding new degree offerings to include Environmental Technology, Therapeutic Recreation, Warehouse Management, Pharmaceutical Manufacturing Technology, Earth Science, Criminal Justice, Security Management, and Certificate Programs to include Animal Care and Management and Licensed Practical Nurse (formerly a non-credit certificate program); improved existing curricula; revitalized the CORE and realigned remediation.

Keizs has attended and/or presented at national and international conferences, e.g. Co-presenter at First Annual International Conference for Community and Further Education Colleges, Bath, England, June 1998; Panelist: AAHE Conference on Education and Collaboration, Washington, DC, March, 1999; Presenter: AACC Pre-Convention workshop on Remediation; Presenter: AACC Politics of Remediation, Nashville Tennessee, April 1999; Presenter: League for Innovation, Phoenix, Arizona March 2003, Assessment & Accountability: The Bronx Community Model; Presenter: AACC Dallas, Texas, April 2003, Begging for Baselines: Creating a Culture of Assessment at BCC; Presenter: Brown vs Board of Education: The Community College Legacy, New York University Network Forum, New Orleans, 2004; attended (by invitation only) Conference on Remediation, Stanford University, spring 1998, Executive Leadership Conference, Cornell University, August 1999, among others. She has served as a commission member on the American Association Community of Colleges Commissions, Technology (past member) and Marketing (current member.)

In her former home community in the Wakefield section of the Bronx, where she lived for almost 20 years, Keizs developed an after-school program, initiated a civic organization, administered youth employment programs and served on the community board. Keizs has served on the boards of the National Council on Black American Affairs (Northeast), Teachers College Alumni Council and the Association of Black Women in Higher Education. She currently serves as Chair of The Board of the Morris Heights Health Center in the Bronx, Member of the Greenburgh Library Foundation and a member of the Vestry, St. Andrews Episcopal Church in Hartsdale. She is the founding editor of the New York Carib News and has published articles about Afro-American Literature. Keizs is also a member of the Greater Jamaica (New York) Development Corporation and part of the American Council on Education's Commission on Effective Leadership.

In 2019, after 14 years as the president of York College / CUNY Keizs stepped down as the President of York College
