= Jeanine Menze =

United States Coast Guard officer

Jeanine McIntosh-Menze
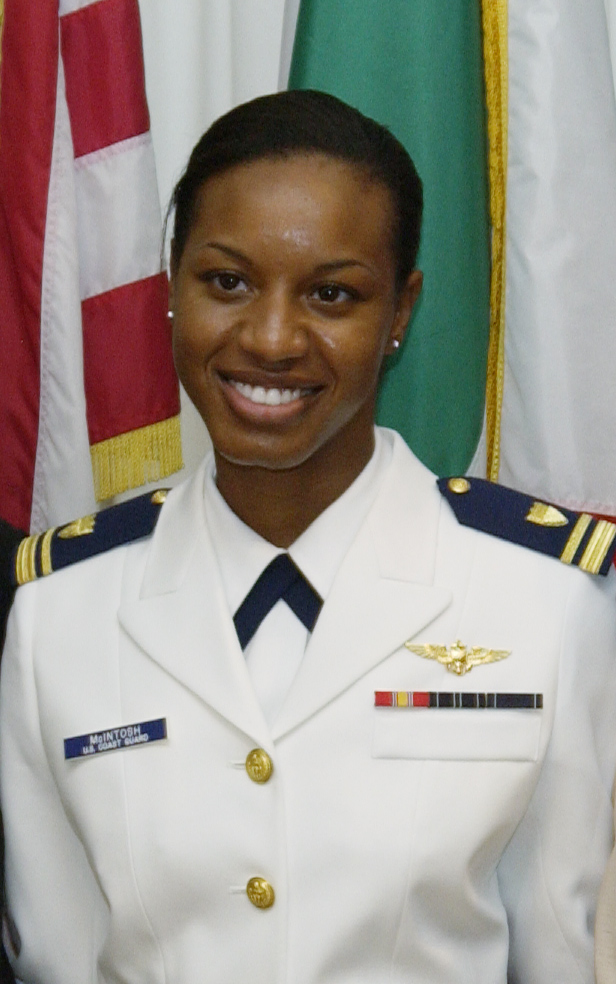
- Coast Guard LCDR Jeanine McIntosh (Lt. JG at the time of the photo)
- Born: Kingston, Jamaica
- Military career
- Service years: 2003 - present
- Rank: Commander

Jeanine McIntosh Menze is a United States Coast Guard officer. She holds the distinction of becoming the first black female in the U.S. Coast Guard to earn the Coast Guard Aviation designation.

At the time of her graduation, she was the first black female aviator in the history of the U.S. Coast Guard.

== Early life and education ==
McIntosh was born in Kingston, Jamaica. After graduating from Florida International University in 2001, she decided to pursue her dream of flying, taking flying lessons at North Perry Airport in Pembroke Pines (Broward County, Florida).

Menzie attended Vaz Preparatory School in Kingston, Jamaica. Her family moved to Canada before relocating to South Florida, where she graduated from Miami Killian High School in May 1997 and Florida International University in May 2001 with an international business degree. She also served as a flight instructor at Opa-locka Airport in Opa-locka, Florida.

== Career ==
Menze joined the U.S. Coast Guard in 2003 after graduation from the Coast Guard Officer Candidate School.

She began Coast Guard aviation training at Naval Air Station Corpus Christi, Texas in January 2005. She earned her aviator wings on June 24, 2005 and was assigned to fly HC-130 Hercules aircraft out of Air Station Barbers Point, Hawaii.

After graduation she served as a pilot of the HC-130 Hercules airplanes and flew rescue missions for the U.S. Coast Guard in New Orleans following Hurricane Katrina.

As of 2020, Menze holds the rank of Commander.
