= Trevor Dawes =

Jamaican-American librarian and educator

Trevor A. Dawes
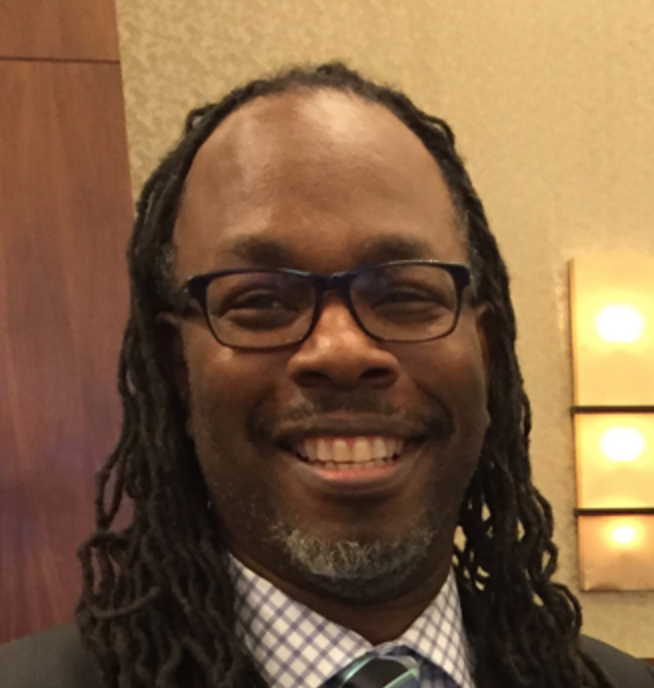
- Trevor A. Dawes
- Born: August 17, 1966 (age 60); Saint Catherine Parish, Jamaica
- Occupation: Librarian
- Employer: University of Delaware
- Known for: President of ACRL, 2013–2014; President of ARL, 2024
- Website: trevordawes.wordpress.com

Trevor A. Dawes is a Jamaican-born American librarian and educator. He is the vice provost for libraries and museums and May Morris University Librarian at the University of Delaware. He was honored as Academic/Research Librarian of the Year in 2026 by the Association of College and Research Libraries.

== Early life and education ==
Dawes was born in St. Catherine, Jamaica, to Louise and Charles Dawes. The family relocated to Brooklyn, New York, in 1980.

Dawes received a BA degree in sociology from Columbia University in 1990 and an MA in educational administration from Teachers College, Columbia University in 1994. He earned a MLS from Rutgers University–New Brunswick in 2001 and Ed.M in educational leadership from Teachers College, Columbia University the following year.

== Career ==
Dawes began his career in academic library management with positions at Columbia University and Princeton University prior to 2013.

=== Washington University in St. Louis ===
Dawes served as Associate University Librarian at Washington University in St. Louis from 2013 to 2016. During his tenure, the WUSTL Libraries helped create Documenting Ferguson (Washington University Libraries § Documenting Ferguson). This community-driven digital repository documents the unrest in Ferguson, Missouri after the murder of Michael Brown at the hands of police.

=== University of Delaware ===
Dawes is currently the Vice Provost for Libraries, Museums, and Press and May Morris University Librarian at the University of Delaware. Having served in this role since 2016, Dawes has overseen a significant period of change at the institution. During his tenure, responsibility for the University Museums and University of Delaware Press was formally added to his management portfolio and has been incorporated into a single organization.

Additionally, Dawes has been an adjunct professor at Drexel University College of Computing and Informatics and other institutions since 2006.

== Social and professional recognition ==
Dawes was named president of the Association of College and Research Libraries in July 2013 and served for one year. Prior to assuming the presidency, Dawes served as Vice President/President-Elect for one year and as Past President during Campion's term.

During his tenure as president, Dawes continued his work on equity, diversity, and inclusion. He also focused on increasing financial literacy and worked to expand discussions around how libraries add value to their institutions.

On June 16, 2021, Dawes was appointed as a commissioner to the Japan-U.S. Friendship Commission (JUSFC).

Dawes was elected the 2024 President of the Association of Research Libraries (ARL) on October 18, 2023. Dawes has been active in the organization and also serves on the board.
