= Ira Lunan Ferguson =

American novelist

- Ferguson in the 1940s
- Born: Ira Lunan Lamontanio Ferguson; January 27, 1904; St. George, Jamaica (British West Indies)
- Died: August 5, 1994 (aged 90); San Francisco, California
- Other name: Ira Lunan Lamontanio Ferguson
- Occupations: Author, psychologist
- Known for: Autobiographies

Ira Lunan Ferguson, B.A., B.Sc., M.A., M.Sc., Ph.D., LL.B. (born Ira Lunan Lamontanio Ferguson; January 27, 1904 – August 5, 1994) was an American psychologist and author of multiple autobiographies as well as several novels and many published essays and journal articles. He is perhaps best known for his autobiographical trilogy, I Dug Graves at Night to Attend College by Day (1968–70).

== Life and work ==
Ferguson was born in Jamaica, British West Indies, on January 27, 1904. In 1919, he was sent to the Wills Eye Hospital in Philadelphia for treatment and correction of his very poor eyesight. He was classified as "functionally blind," as his vision could be only partially corrected. Nevertheless, he said: "I always felt I was only half blind, and never considered myself handicapped." He lived in the United States for the remainder of his life.

He was married twice. He and his second wife, who was White, lived in Birmingham, Alabama, and attended the African-American 16th Street Baptist Church. After the infamous fire bombing of the church in September 1963, he and his wife decided to leave the South and settled in San Francisco, where there was less racial tension and interracial marriage was more accepted. He had an office on Clement Street in the Avenues, and his wife preceded him in death. He was a prolific author with a larger-than-life personality, and continued to study and write until his death on August 5, 1994.

== Works (list is not complete) ==
Autobiography

- I Dug Graves at Night to Attend College by Day: The Story of a West Indian Negro-American's First 30 Years in the United States: An Autobiography: Volume I, Brooklyn, NY: Theo. Gaus' Sons, Inc, 1968 (486 pp.)
- I Dug Graves at Night to Attend College by Day: My Later Years as a Naturalized West Indian-American: An Autobiography: Volume II, Brooklyn, NY : Theo. Gaus' Sons, Inc, 1969
- I Dug Graves at Night to Attend College by Day: Reflections: 50 Years of Life in America– Humor, Pathos, Rewards: An Autobiography: Volume III, San Francisco, CA: The Lunan-Ferguson Library, 1970 (296 pp.)
- Fantastic Experiences of a Half-Blind, and His Interracial Marriage: An Autobiography, San Francisco: Lunan-Ferguson Library, c1982 (494 pp.)

Fiction

- Ocee McRae. Texas., 1962
- Which One of You Is Interracial? And other stories: a delightful trilogy, 1969
- The Biography of G. Wash Carter, "White," a "laughogenic" satirical novel: the life story of a Mississippi Peckerwood whose short circuit logic kept him fantastically embroiled, 1969

Non-Fiction

- Health Education in Tuberculosis, With Particular Reference to the Negro Population, 1950
- The Mathematics of Dosages and Solutions for Nurses, Elizabeth (Betty) S. Ferguson with co-author Ira L. Ferguson, 1956
- Our Two Ocean Voyages- The Orient and Mediterranean/Morocco: A travelogue: Life aboard two luxury ocean liners, 1968
- Essay Lectures in Black Studies, ("text for college students, professionals, and adults. Includes a manual for Whites and manual for Blacks on how to treat one another"), 1972
- Don't Marry That Woman! The marriage book of the 20th century for women aged 16 to 90 ("how to get and hold a husband, and all a woman wants and needs to know") 1973
- 25 Good Reasons Why Men Should Marry ("With manual for husbands on how to treat a wife. Comprehensive, everything a man should know. For all men 21 to 100"), 1976
- Facing Reality, a Functional Blueprint for Living, 1977
- 83 Practical Philosophical Observations by an Octogenarian Psychologist, San Francisco: Lunan-Ferguson Library, 1985 (562 pp.)
- Happiness is Now Yours!: Speak the Speech, Doctor, Speak the Speech!, San Francisco: Lunan-Ferguson Library, 1988 (1045 pp.)
- Trigonometry in Action by Sarah Elizabeth Ferguson and Ira Lunan Ferguson, Portland, Me.: J.W. Walch, 1981 (239 pp.)
- Sociological-Philosophical Psychological Litany of Do's and Don'ts: A Most Original, Comprehensive, Valuable and Timely Guide for Safer, More Successful, Productive, Rewarding Living, 1991

== See also ==
- Naturalization
- Blindness
- Relationship counseling
- Jamaican diaspora
