= Michelle Bernard =

American journalist

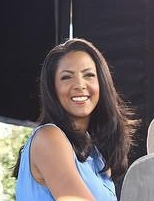
- Born: Michelle Denise Bernard; July 30, 1963 (age 63); Washington, D.C., U.S.
- Education: Georgetown University Law Center (JD); Howard University (BA)
- Occupations: Journalist, author, lawyer, columnist
- Political party: Independent
- Website: bernardcenter.org

Michelle Denise Bernard (born July 30, 1963, Washington, D.C.) is an American journalist, political analyst, lawyer, author, and President and CEO of the Bernard Center For Women, Politics & Public Policy.

== Education ==
Bernard graduated from Howard University with a B.A. in philosophy and a minor in political science. She has a Juris Doctor degree from Georgetown University Law Center.

== Early life and career ==
She was a partner at the lobbyist and law firm Patton Boggs. In 2000, she was a member of the Bush-Cheney Presidential Inaugural Committee. She was formerly President and CEO of Independent Women's Forum and Independent Women's Voice. She was the chair for the District of Columbia's Redevelopment Land Agency, which negotiated the public-private financing of the District's MCI Arena.

Bernard is frequently a political and legal analyst for MSNBC, Al Jazeera, CNN, NPR and The McLaughlin Group. She is a columnist for Roll Call; and also a contributor for 'The Seventy-Four',The Root, The Washington Post's "She the People," and the Huffington Post.

She is an Independent.

She is a member of the Board of Trustees of Hampton University and sits on the board of directors of the Coalition for Opportunity in Education and the executive board of the International Women's Forum of Washington, D.C. where she is the Leadership Foundation Liaison. Additionally, she is a member of the advisory board of the American Board for Certification of Teacher Excellence, and a speaker for the Washington Speaker's Bureau.

Her family heritage is Jamaican American, saying in an interview with Bill Steigerwald, "My parents are American citizens, but they come from Jamaica. I was raised with very American and Jamaican values. In our culture, we have a very strong sense of pride and of family honor and of self-reliance."

== Awards ==
- Bernard was granted the 2016 Howard University Distinguished Alumni Achievement Award in the Fields of Media, Journalism and Public Policy.
- Bernard was named the Spring 2015 Mary Louise Smith Chair in Women and Politics by Iowa State University on March 23, 2015.
- She received the Anvil of Freedom Award for Journalism and Democracy from the University of Denver's Estlow International Center for Journalism & New Media on January 23, 2015.
- Also, she was named in the November 2014 of Essence Magazine as a Rising Star in their Money & Power list.

== Personal life ==
Bernard was married to CNN correspondent Joe Johns until the couple divorced in 2008. Bernard remarried in 2014 and lives in Potomac, Maryland with her two children from her previous marriage. Her second husband, Keith Bell, died in 2019.

== Bibliography ==
- Bernard, Michelle D. (2013), Moving America Toward Justice: The Lawyers' Committee For Civil Rights Under Law, 1963-2013, The Donning Company Publishers. ISBN 978-1-57864-849-8
- Bernard, Michelle D. (2007), Women’s Progress: How Women Are Wealthier, Healthier, and More Independent Than Ever Before, Spence Pub. ISBN 1-890626-69-4
