= Robert Rashford =

American aerospace engineer

Robert Rashford (born 15 June 1957) is a Jamaican-born American aerospace engineer.

== Biography ==
Rashford was born in Kingston, Jamaica, on 15 June 1957. He moved to the United States in 1978, and has degrees from Temple University and the University of Maryland.

Rashford co-invented the world's first portable 3D non-destructive evaluation (NDE) system. This invention was used in the maintenance of the United States Government's Hubble Space Telescope. Rashford also invented a protective enclosure for use in transporting orbital replacement units (orus). Rashford designed and developed unique spacecraft support systems for the Upper Atmosphere Research Satellite (UARS) Airborne Support Equipment (UASE) at the Orbital Sciences Corporation (OSC). At General Electric, he designed and tested a variety of spacecraft for both commercial and military applications. At Bechtel Corporation, he designed a nuclear reactor support structure. He has designed numerous highly complex engineering systems that successfully flew onboard NASA's Manned Space Flight Programs.
