= Claudia L. Gordon =

American attorney

Claudia Gordon
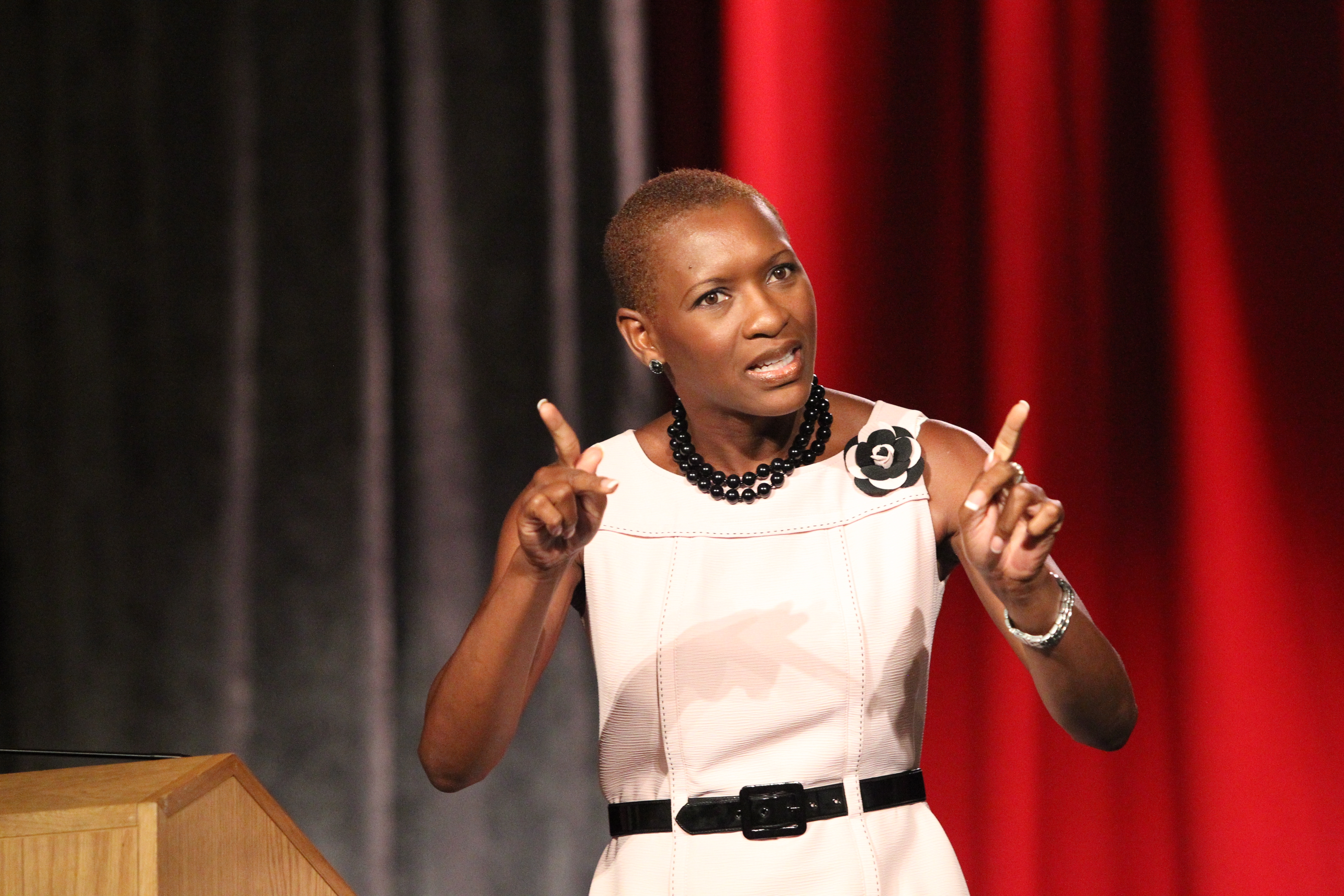
- Born: March 1972 (age 54); St. Mary, Jamaica
- Education: Howard University (BA); American University (JD)

Claudia L. Gordon (born March 1972) is the first deaf Black female attorney in the United States and the first deaf graduate of American University's law school. She currently serves as Senior Accessibility Strategy Partner at T-Mobile within its Diversity, Equity and Inclusion team. Prior to joining the telecom industry, Gordon held various roles in the public sector from 2002 to 2017—most notably as the associate director in the White House Office of Public Engagement, where she advised White House offices and senior officials including former President Barack Obama on disability issues. This political appointment made Gordon the first deaf person to work at the White House in a detailee capacity. She was appointed to the National Council on Disability in 2022, and served as Chair from 2024-2025.

== Early life ==
Gordon was born in St. Mary, Jamaica in March 1972.

She suddenly lost her sense of hearing at the age of eight. At the time, she was in the care of her aunt Mildred Taylor, a teacher. She took her to a clinic and healers, to no avail. The clinic nurse couldn't diagnose the pain in Gordon's middle ears, nor could the healers restore her hearing. Her family was then forced to take her out of primary school for almost two years since her school couldn't accommodate her needs as a deaf student. She was kept at home to do chores instead.

When Gordon was eleven, she immigrated to the United States and reunited with her mother, who was living in South Bronx, New York.

== Education ==
When she was eleven, Gordon attended a public school before enrolling at the Lexington School and Center for the Deaf in New York. At Lexington, she learned sign language for the first time and became the valedictorian of her junior and senior high school graduating classes. She was also active in sports, student organizations, and community activities. One of these activities is the mock trial sponsored by the American Bar Association. For three years, Gordon was a member of the only deaf mock trial team in New York and the only deaf high school to ever win the competition.

It was in high school when Gordon knew she wanted to be a lawyer, with the discrimination she experienced in Jamaica as her inspiration.

"By my junior year in high school, I made it known to all that I would go to law school and become an attorney. Many shrugged off my grand intention as wishful thinking. Some cited my deafness as an obstacle rendering it impractical if not impossible to pursue a law degree. Thanks to the values that were instilled in me during my formative years, I understood then that those voices of doubt neither dictated my worth nor my capacity. I want to contribute to a better society where there is more understanding and acceptance of people with disabilities and where the same opportunities are provided for all." - Gordon, Obama White House, 30 August 2010

In 1995, Gordon graduated with honors from Howard University. Along with her Bachelor of Arts degree in political science, she also earned a spot in The Patricia Roberts Harris Public Affairs Fellowship, Golden Key National Honor Society, and Political Science Honor Society.

In 2000, Gordon became the first deaf student to graduate from the American University, Washington College of Law. She was one of the only approximately fifty qualified deaf lawyers in the U.S. and Canada at the time. While at WCL, she was awarded the Myers Law Scholarship twice as well as the J. Franklin Bourne Scholarship.

== Career ==
=== 2000–2003: Non-profit organization ===
After law school, Gordon was awarded a two-year fellowship with Skadden Fellowship Foundation. With her fellowship project sponsored by the National Association of the Deaf, she "provided direct representation and advocacy for poor deaf persons, with a particular emphasis placed on outreach to members of minority groups".

=== 2002–2017: Government agencies ===
Gordon's career in the public sector started with the National Council on Disability, where she was a consulting attorney. After a year in service, she was appointed as an attorney advisor and later promoted to senior policy advisor for the United States Department of Homeland Security, Office for Civil Rights and Civil Liberties. She was instrumental in drafting and implementing an executive order on Individuals with Disabilities in Emergency Preparedness.

Notably, Gordon was deployed to Baton Rouge, Louisiana following Hurricane Katrina in 2005 where she served as the disability and elderly populations' civil rights subject matter expert at the Joint Field Office (JFO). While there she developed and executed technical assistance and training to JFO staff and coordinate resolutions of discrimination and accessibility issues.

Gordon became a member of the Obama Administration from 2009 to 2017. During the Presidency of Barack Obama, she served as the Special Assistant and subsequently as the Chief of Staff to the Office of Federal Contract Compliance Programs Director in the United States Department of Labor. She was also the associate director at the White House Office of Public Engagement.

Gordon was part of the Presidential Delegation of Barack Obama sent to Rio de Janeiro, Brazil for the Opening Ceremony of the 2016 Summer Paralympics.

=== 2017–present: Private sector and National Council on Disability ===
Before joining T-Mobile to lead strategies for disability-inclusive culture and accessible work environment, Gordon was a Senior Manager of Government and Compliance at Sprint.

On November 17, 2022, President Joe Biden appointed Gordon to the National Council on Disability. During her time at NCD, Gordon was designated by Chairman Andrés J. Gallegos, Esq as Vice Chair and served on NCD’s Executive Committee. After Gallegos died on December 1, 2023, and Gordon became Acting-Chair. Gordon became Chair of the Council on April 9, 2024.

== Awards and recognition ==
- Paul G. Hearne Leadership Award from the American Association of People with Disabilities (2003)
- Hurricane Response Award from the United States Secretary of Homeland Security (2005)
- Gold Medal Award from the Secretary of Homeland Security (2006)
- Deaf Person of the Year award from Deaf Life Magazine (2010)
- Amos Kendall Award (2011)
- The Root 100 honor from The Root (2014)
- Disability Rights Hero honor from Google + 72andSunny (2015)
- The Susan M. Daniels Disability Mentoring Hall of Fame from National Disability Mentoring Coalition (2016)

== Advocacy ==
Gordon has been active in both the black deaf community and the cross disability community. She was the national vice president of the National Black Deaf Advocates from 2002 to 2005. She has served on multiple boards, including American Association of People with Disabilities and Gallaudet University.

== Current board memberships ==
- National Council on Disability, Chairperson
- ACLU District of Columbia Board of Directors, Executive Committee
- DeafKidz International, Global Ambassador
- Centene National Disability Advisory Council
- Center for Democracy and Technology Project on Disability Rights & Algorithmic Fairness, Advisory Committee
- Flexibility, Advisor
- Lexington School and Center for the Deaf, Trustee

Gordon is a member of organizations, such as the Alpha chapter of Delta Sigma Theta sorority

== Public speaking ==
Gordon is a public speaker on a broad range of topics primarily pertaining to disability civil rights law, non-discrimination and equal access; grassroots leadership and advocacy; and disability, youth and women empowerment. Gordon shared her ongoing quest to create spaces in society for seldom-heard voices in her TEDx Talk: Owning Otherness.

== See also ==
- List of first women lawyers and judges in the United States
