= Paul R. Cunningham =

Surgeon and medical dean (born 1949)

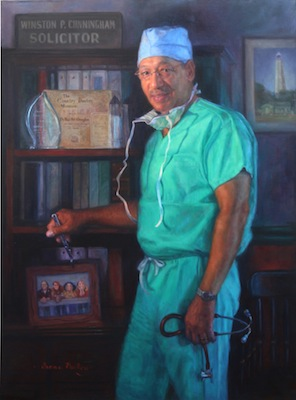
- Dr Paul R. Cunningham, Jamaican American surgeon (painting by Irene Bailey)
- Born: Paul Raymond Goldwyn Cunningham; July 28, 1949; Mandeville, Colony of Jamaica, British Empire
- Education: University of the West Indies
- Medical career
- Profession: Surgeon

Paul Raymond Goldwyn Cunningham (born 1949) is a Jamaican American surgeon and medical educator known for pioneering as one of the few African American medical Deans existing in the United States. Their number becomes even smaller when only considering non-minority Med schools. Cunningham was appointed Dean of The Brody School of Medicine at East Carolina University in 2008. (Greenville, North Carolina), where he became a tenured Professor of Surgery in 1989. He graduated as an MD from the University of the West Indies in 1972, and further specialized in surgery at the Mount Sinai Hospital and Medical Center (Manhattan). He practiced and taught surgery for several years at the Bertie-County and Pitt-County Memorial Hospitals (Windsor, and Greenville, NC) before joining academia. Cunningham has published numerous research articles in areas such as trauma, bariatric surgery, allograft and organ transplantation. In 2016 he was honored Dean Emeritus after serving Brody School of Medicine for 29 years, eight as dean. He is a current member (2025) of the North Carolina Medical Care Commission.

== Biography ==
Dean Paul Cunningham was born on July 28, 1949, in Mandeville, Jamaica, the son of Winston P Cunningham and Sylvia F Marsh. He grew up in Jamaica, where his grandfather was a veterinarian. He graduated from DeCarteret College High School in 1966. He is married to Sydney Keniston and has two biological children (Rachel Cunningham Filler and Lucinda Cunningham Lathan) and two children by marriage (Shawn Thornton and Tifanie Thornton Kingston).

== Career ==
After medical graduation in Jamaica in 1972, Cunningham completed his residency in Surgery at the Mount Sinai School of Medicine in 1979, and also worked as a surgeon at Bronx Veterans Administration Hospital and City Hospital at Elmhurst, all in New York City. Moving his practice to NC in 1981, he became vice-chief of medical staff at Bertie Memorial Hospital, where he began teaching ECU medical students. Cunningham joined the ECU faculty full time in 1984, became medical director of trauma the following year, and chief medical staff at Pitt County Memorial Hospital in 1991. For six years (2002–2008) Cunningham became Professor & Chair at the Department of Surgery of SUNY Upstate Medical University, Syracuse, New York. He returned to Greenville NC in 2008 to become Dean of The Brody School of Medicine and Senior Associate Vice Chancellor for Medical Affairs of East Carolina University, positions he presently holds.

When announcing his appointment as a Dean, ECU Chancellor Steve Ballard is quoted to have said: "Paul Cunningham is exactly the right choice to lead the Brody School of Medicine. He is a highly accomplished, widely respected physician. He is familiar with the school's mission and with the health care challenges facing this region and state, and he is a former chief of staff of our teaching hospital. Most importantly, Dr. Cunningham has the leadership skills and strength of character to assure excellence in the Brody school".

A list of Dean Cunningham´s appointments also includes:

- Assistant Director, Department of Surgery, Joint Disease North General Hospital, New York, 1979–1981
- Attending surgeon, Bertie County Memorial Hospital, Windsor, North Carolina, 1981–1984
- Attending surgeon Pitt County Memorial Hospital, 1984–2002
- Professor of Surgery, East Carolina University, 1993–2002
- Chief of Staff, Pitt County Memorial Hospital, 1991–1992
- Commissioned Major of the US Army, 1990 to 1998 (honorably discharged)
- President of the Eastern Association for the Surgery of Trauma in 2000
- Governor of the American College of Surgeons (current)

== Service ==
Cunningham serves on a number of community organizations, occupying the positions such as:

- Member of North Carolina Medical Care Commission.
- Member and past president of North Carolina Medical Review Board.
- Member and past President of the North Carolina Medical Society.
- Member of the Board of Directors at ECU Medical & Health Sciences Foundation.

== Honors ==
Cunningham has received awards such as:

- In 2013, the Presidential Award from the National Medical Association for his continued dedication to medical education.
- In 2016, he was named Dean Emeritus at East Carolina University.
- In 2017, the Order of the Long Leaf Pine by the Governor of North Carolina for his outstanding contribution to health care in the state.
- In 2018, the Jacobi Medallion from the Icahn School of Medicine at Mount Sinai.

== Memberships ==
Dean Cunningham has held numerous professional representations and memberships at different levels in the US. A list of current memberships includes:

- American Medical Association, 1979
- National Medical Association, 1983
- Association for Academic Surgery, 1985
- American College of Surgeons, 1986
- American Council on Transplantation, 1986
- Sigma Xi, The Scientific Research Society, 1986
- Pan American Trauma Society, 1988
- The Society of Critical Care Medicine, 1989
- The Society of Phi Kappa Phi, 1989
- Academy of Surgical Research, 1989
- Association for Surgical Education, 1990

== Research ==
Topics covered by Cunningham´s research articles include:

- Management of vascular trauma
- Clinical and experimental gastric bypass surgery
- Allografts and organ transplantation
