= E. Dale Abel =

American endocrinologist (born 1963)

Evan Dale Abel
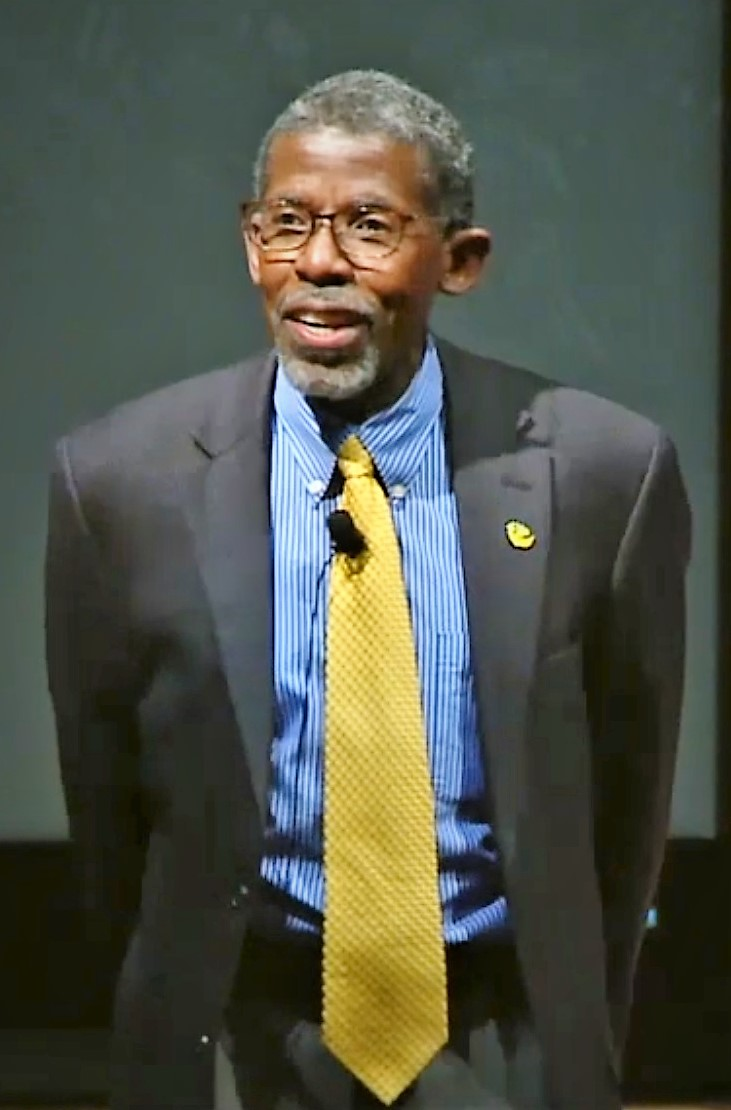
- Abel lecturing at the National Institutes of Health in 2018
- Born: 1963 (age 62–63)
- Education: University of the West Indies; University of Oxford
- Scientific career
- Workplaces: Northwestern University; University of Iowa; University of Utah
- Thesis: Insulin and blood pressure (1990)
- Website: Abel Lab

Evan Dale Abel (born 1963) is an American endocrinologist who serves as chair of the Department of Medicine at the David Geffen School of Medicine at UCLA, succeeding Alan Fogelman who stepped down after 29 years. His works on the molecular mechanisms that underpin cardiac failure in diabetes. He is a fellow of the American Heart Association and the American College of Physicians. He was elected a member of the National Academy of Sciences in 2022.

== Early life and education ==
Abel was born on February 4, 1963, in Jamaica, where he attended Wolmer's High School for Boys. He was encouraged by his parents to become a doctor, lawyer or engineer. He completed his undergraduate studies at the University of the West Indies, where he specialised in medicine. He completed his doctoral research in physiology at the University of Oxford. He was a medical intern in surgery and paediatrics at the University of the West Indies, before completing his residency in internal medicine at Northwestern University.

== Research and career ==
Abel started a clinical research fellowship in diabetes at Harvard Medical School in 1992. He then joined the faculty at Harvard, where he was appointed co-director of the fellowship programme at Beth Israel Deaconess Medical Center. He worked alongside Barbara Kahn, with whom he identified the relationship between adipose tissue glucose transporter (GLUT4) and insulin resistance. He was recruited to the faculty at the University of Utah in 2000, first as assistant professor and eventually as Professor of Medicine. Abel was supported by the National Institutes of Health to develop a mouse model of diabetes. He studied how glucose is delivered to cells. He made use of conditional gene targeting to induce genetic defects that resulted in heart muscle cells being incapable of taking up glucose.

In 2013 Abel moved to the University of Iowa as chair of the Department of Internal Medicine. His works on the molecular mechanisms that underpin cardiac failure in diabetes. He has investigated how diabetes impacts the formation of blood clots, with the increased glucose uptake of platelets in diabetic mice promoting overactivation and excess clotting.

In 2022 Abel moved to the University of California, Los Angeles as chair of the Department of Medicine in the David Geffen School of Medicine at UCLA.

Outside of his research, Abel has served since 2012 as a principal investigator for the Endocrine Society's FLARE (Future Leaders Advancing Research in Endocrinology) initiative, a program designed to support scientists from historically underrepresented groups in establishing research careers

== Awards and honors ==
- 1986: Rhodes Scholarship at the University of Oxford
- 1996: Harvard Medical School Eleanor and Miles Shore, 50th Anniversary Scholars in Medicine Fellowship
- 1999: Harvard Medical School Excellence in Teaching Award
- 2001: American Thyroid Association Van Meter Award
- 2001: David W. Haack Memorial Award in Cardiovascular Research
- 2003: Established Investigator of the American Heart Association
- 2012: Meharry Medical College James Pulliam Memorial Lectureship
- 2012: Endocrine Society Gerald D. Aurbach Award Lecture
- 2013: Elected fellow of the American Heart Association
- 2015: University of Tennessee Health Science Center the Max Miller Lecture
- 2015: Elected to the National Academy of Medicine
- 2018: NIH Director's Astute Clinician Lecture
- 2018: African American Museum of Iowa History Makers Award
- 2020: Selected as president-elect of the Association of Professors of Medicine
- 2020: Named by Cell Press as one of the most inspirational Black scientists in the United States
- 2023: Fred Conrad Koch Lifetime Achievement Award, the Endocrine Society's highest award, for his significant impact on endocrinology
- 2023: Awarded with an Honorary Doctor of Science Degree by his alma mater, the University of the West Indies

== Selected publications ==
- Boudina, Sihem; Abel, E. Dale (2007-06-26). "Diabetic Cardiomyopathy Revisited". Circulation. 115 (25): 3213–3223. doi:10.1161/circulationaha.106.679597. ISSN 0009-7322. PMID 17592090.
- Abel, E. Dale; Peroni, Odile; Kim, Jason K.; Kim, Young-Bum; Boss, Olivier; Hadro, Ed; Minnemann, Timo; Shulman, Gerald I.; Kahn, Barbara B. (2001). "Adipose-selective targeting of the GLUT4 gene impairs insulin action in muscle and liver". Nature. 409 (6821): 729–733. Bibcode:2001Natur.409..729A. doi:10.1038/35055575. ISSN 1476-4687. PMID 11217863. S2CID 4405220.
- Boudina, Sihem; Abel, Evan Dale (2010). "Diabetic cardiomyopathy, causes and effects". Reviews in Endocrine and Metabolic Disorders. 11 (1): 31–39. doi:10.1007/s11154-010-9131-7. ISSN 1389-9155. PMC 2914514. PMID 20180026.
