= Amos H. Carnegie =

Jamaican-American Baptist minister

Reverend Amos Hubert Carnegie was a Jamaican-American Baptist minister who traveled throughout the eastern United States in the early and middle 20th century and financed several schools, hospitals and foundations.

== Overview ==
Rev Carnegie was a preacher in the US in the 1930s. He funded institutions for black people during the Jim Crow era and was also the founder and director of the National Hospital Foundation Inc. The influence of Carnegie and the hospital movement are cited in the text and bibliography of The Papers of Martin Luther King, Jr: Advocate of the social gospel.

Carnegie's autobiography, entitled Faith Moves Mountains is available online for free.

== Birth ==
Amos H. Carnegie, Sr. was born on a farm in the Alison district, Manchester Parish, Jamaica, British West Indies in April 1886. He had eight siblings, including four boys and four girls, but one died in infancy. He was raised by his Christian parents, Thomas and Mary (née Donaldson) Carnegie.

== Early adulthood ==
Carnegie had almost completed high school when he joined the Police Force and was appointed to the position of office orderly. Six months later, he became a policeman in Port Antonio, Jamaica. Within three years, his eyesight became impaired and he was honorably discharged from the Police Force. He then became a clerk of Port Antonio's government market.

== First leadership positions ==
While he was a police officer in Port Antonio, he joined a Baptist church, was baptized, and became a full member of the church. He was elected Superintendent of the Sunday School and President of the Christian Endeavor Society. He was also elected vice president of an organizing committee that founded the YMCA of Port Antonio, Jamaica, during which time he made his decision to become a minister and preach the Christian gospel.

== Carnegie in Canada ==
In 1915, Carnegie left Jamaica for Canada with a plan to go to on to the US to study divinity. In Canada, he planned to work his way through divinity school, but found prejudice, color-aroused antagonism and discrimination. In spite of references from the YMCA and the Jamaican Government, he could only find menial labor, picking apples and working as a sleeping car porter. With a gift from a benefactor, he enrolled in a primarily African-American school, Virginia Union University.

Without funds, he struggled to finish college, but he raised money by preaching at churches in the US and Canada, and received donations. He attended the Chatham Collegiate in Chatham, Ontario for a year while serving as pastor of a nearby church.

== Imprisonment ==
In 1917, Carnegie was drafted into the Canadian Army to fight in World War I, but as a Christian minister he was “hostile to the spirit of war”. For refusing to serve, he was court-martialed and sent to a prison camp where he was made to do hard labor. There, he evangelized his fellow prisoners.

== College Graduation ==
When he graduated from Lincoln University in 1923, he won the college's $50.00 Nassau Prize.

== Marriage and Children ==
Once in the US, he married Susan Blake, also from Jamaica, and they had six children, one of whom died at birth.

== Ordination ==
Carnegie spoke and delivered sermons at various churches and civic gatherings in Virginia, West Virginia and South Carolina and he became pastor of the Carmel Methodist Church.

== Plan to Build Schools ==
Carnegie found the US to be deeply divided along racial lines by Jim Crow segregation, where other blacks warned him to step off the sidewalks if he saw whites coming along. Living conditions, including abysmal housing and miserable or nonexistent education, were leading blacks to engage in the Great Northward Migration literally by the millions. He visited jails and slums and observed that blacks’ schools were severely dilapidated or nonexistent, while many blacks lived on whites’ property in mud huts In response, he founded the first high school in Smyth Country, Virginia for African American students, which was named after him as the Carnegie High School. It was the only black high school in a hundred-mile area. Two decades later, the school was closed in a consolidation with white public schools, with the goal of desegregation. After the closure, the building housed the local Head Start program.

When he traveled, he continued to face segregated churches, transportation, hotels, restaurants and other facilities. His children attended segregated schools and rarely saw whites at all, according to his daughter in her autobiography.

Carnegie was involved in many projects, mainly financed by the Rosenwald Fund, to fund and build schools for blacks in the American South during the Jim Crow era.

== Campaigns for Black Schools ==
Returning to the US, Carnegie traveled widely, speaking to audiences composed of civil leaders, business leaders, landowners and politicians, and he convinced southern whites to support the founding of schools for blacks. Among other arguments, he appealed to whites’ self-interest, arguing that the mass migration of blacks to the North was driven by poverty and lack of education. Proposing to build schools and hospitals for blacks was inherently controversial in states where it had recently been illegal to assemble blacks to teach them to read. He saw the construction of as many schools as possible a way of preparing unlettered blacks to read the Bible and, therefore, as a natural outgrowth of his itinerant Christian ministry.

With monies from the Rosenwald Fund, he built several Rosenwald schools. A Rosenwald School “was the name informally applied to over 5,000 schools, shops, and teachers' homes in the US which were built primarily for the education of African-Americans in the early 20th century . . . Julius Rosenwald, an American clothier who became part-owner and president of Sears, Roebuck and Company, was the founder of The Rosenwald Fund, through which he contributed seed money for many of the schools and other philanthropic causes. To promote collaboration between white and black citizens, Rosenwald required communities to commit public funds to the schools, as well as to contribute additional cash donations.”

Carnegie was one of many leaders in African-American rural communities across the South who raised millions of dollars to fund better education for their children by winning state funds available for the construction of schools for blacks and contributions from wealthy individuals, white and black. Meanwhile, he travelled throughout the Eastern US preaching and seeking funding for his schools.

== Plans to Build Hospitals for Blacks in Segregated States ==
Seeing a need for hospitals for blacks, Carnegie conceived a plan for blacks to build hospitals staffed by black doctors, through the National Hospital Foundation, particularly in cities with black populations of at least 10,000.

In 1951, the Journal of Medical Education reported that Carnegie's National Hospital Foundation and Howard University jointly proposed a 200-bed "interracial" hospital for Washington, DC "predicated on obtaining a $2,000,000 grant from Congress to be matched by the contributions of Negroes throughout the country. Carnegie said the hospital would be interracial in the sense that both Negro and white physicians would be on its staff and that it would accept patients of all races, but that its primary function would be to serve a community of 800,000 Negroes in the northeast sector of Washington who are not now provided with adequate health facilities.".

On October 1, 1953, Jet magazine reported that, "plans for a 200-bed Birmingham AL hospital, staffed by Negro doctors and nurses, were outlined to a group of white citizens by the Rev. Amos H. Carnegie, president of the National Hospital Foundation, Inc. Reverend Carnegie asked Negro employees to contribute fifty cents a week for twenty weeks to finance construction of the hospital. White trustees would control the money raised, Carnegie said.".

Carnegie also proposed a 200-bed hospital for New York City that was to cost $4,000,000.

== Fundraising Models ==
Carnegie's fundraising model varied depending upon the audience and the circumstances, always involving such grants, state and federal monies as were available and sometimes proposing that blacks donate a penny per toward the construction of hospitals.

== Controversy ==
In 1937, the journal of the National Medical Association published a discussion of Carnegie's hospital movement, reporting that he was endeavoring to raise a penny from each African American in the United States, but alleging that he had appropriated the name of the Association without authorization in discussions with the New York Times and rejecting his attempts to attain the support of the Association.

In the article, the Association rebuked and rebuffed Carnegie, ridiculing his belief that he could collect money from all African Americans nationwide and calling his proposals dreams. However, Vanessa Northington Gamble demonstrated in the historical text Making a Place for Ourselves: The Black Hospital Movement 1920-1945, as whites denied blacks access to the hospitals where whites were treated, the question of whether and how to begin to provide hospital care to blacks was inherently political and controversial. Carnegie's voice was influential in the debate; his article entitled, But Integration is Empty Talk was widely cited and debated at the time.

The book, The History of Healthcare in Lynchburg, alleges that in early December, 1935, Carnegie appeared in Lynchburg, collected money from local blacks with a promise to build a hospital staffed by black doctors, and then disappeared with the money and without the hospital being built. However, the locally produced and self-published book includes no sources or citations for the accusation.

The accusation highlights the difficulty he faced engaging in fundraising and earning the trust of black and white populations. In one fundraising campaign, he proposed that money would be raised among blacks to be held in trust by white trustees.

== Greyhound Bus Incident ==
Carnegie was unafraid when he was informed that whites were unhappy with his efforts, but he was not immune to the violence that surrounded him. "In the US, too, Jamaicans like the Rev. Amos Carnegie had suffered from the vicious hatred of southern racists who beat him because he refused to take a back seat on a bus travelling through Georgia one night. And there were many others like him." The incident and the Reverend's legal action were reported widely in the US by wire services. The New York Times also reported the beating. The National Jet magazine reported that Carnegie sued Greyhound Bus for $100,000. It was also reported in the Jamaican newspaper, The Gleaner.

A photograph of him bleeding after the beating can be found in the archives of National Historic Images.

== Arrest ==
He was arrested in Birmingham, AL and convicted of soliciting monies without a license, given a suspended sentence of a year in jail and fined $50.00.

== Influence ==
Carnegie was an inveterate letter writer to institutions, civic leaders and celebrities, with letters published in the New York Times, the Washington Post, a collection of letters to Marion Anderson and several in the archives of Washington, DC's National Negro Opera Company.

Carnegie wrote an article about desegregation that was cited widely by blacks thinkers and organizers. He was cited various times in the national Jet magazine for his hospital plans, for being beaten on a bus and for his arrest. Many newspapers published schedules of radio programs in the 1940s and 50s including reports that Carnegie would be speaking on issues of importance to black people.

== Return to Jamaica ==
In June 1950, Carnegie returned to Jamaica for the first time in almost four decades, as an ambassador for his US hospital movement. The Kingston Gleaner newspaper reported to the National Hospital Foundation, "At the head of this organization is its founder and director, the Rev. Amos H. Carnegie. Mr. Carnegie, paying his first visit to the homeland since he left it, visited the Gleaner yesterday and in a brief talk told of the success that the nationwide hospital scheme that he is directing...".

== Family Life ==
Carnegie and his wife Susan had six children, including the late Hon. Amos Hubert Carnegie, Jr., a New York state judge; the late Rachel Virginia (Holland), Ph.D., professor of sociology; the late Leanora M. (Leach), Ph.D., high school teacher; the late Dr Vida Mae (Gaynor), Ph.D., clinical psychologist and author and the late Joseph Carnegie, a New York labor organizer, as well as "Baby Carnegie" who was stillborn.

In her autobiography, Dr Vida Mae Carnegie (Gaynor), says that her father was often away from the home, failed to provide sustenance or appear for special events in her life, and made a "narcissistic" promise to fund her education on which he subsequently reneged, causing her to lose another scholarship that she would otherwise have received.

Dr Gaynor states that her father should not have referred to himself as a "Reverend", since she believes that he did not pastor a church after 1933. However, other pastors such as the Rev. Dr. Martin Luther King, Jr. used the appellation "Reverend" throughout the Civil Rights Movement although he did not actively pastor an individual church during that period.

Carnegie's autobiography and that of his oldest daughter both recount that he did not always or often have a paid position as a pastor; was an itinerant organizer who subsisted financially from gifts from friends and supporters; often did not have money that he could use to support his family; and could not possibly have been present much in the home during those times when he was meeting civic leaders, politicians, clergy and the black and white public for the purpose of organizing the construction of schools and hospitals.

== Autobiography ==
In 1950, Carnegie published his autobiography, entitled Faith Moves Mountains. The New York Times twice announced the publication of the autobiography.

His autobiography did not identify his parents or siblings by name. He did not mention that he was married or had children until late in the book. When he does mention his wife, he recounts only the disagreements they had over their lack of money. When the Negro Yearbook reviewed the autobiography in 1952, they observed that:

The Reverend Mr. Carnegie has lived a most interesting life, but he lacks the ability to record it to best advantage. His main difficulty is a tendency to overlook all autobiographical details except religious ones. For example, he spent one full year at Virginia Union University, and all that he records of this experience is that he "converted" his roommate. The author has labeled this work "Volume I." Presumably other volumes are to follow. Since he has lived so fully, one hopes that Mr. Carnegie in subsequent installments will give a picture of his whole life, not just those episodes connected with moral and religious uplift.

== Death ==
Rev. Carnegie died in August, 1978 in Flushing, Queens, New York.
