= Rican Da Menace =

- Born: 2000 or 2001 (age 24–25)
- Origin: Baltimore, Maryland
- Genres: Hip hop
- Instrument: vocals

Rican Da Menace is an American rapper.

== Life and career ==
From Baltimore, Rican was born to a Jamaican father and Salvadoran mother. She began rapping at the age of 14. In February 2021, Rican was shot and was hospitalized as a result. She has stated this incident served as a "wake-up call" for her, leading her to focus on her music career more. Rican then "spent the majority of 2022 churning out singles and freestyles to sharpen her skills as a newly emerging rapper on the scene".

Her debut single "Ain't Going Back" was released in July 2022. In November, she released "I Admit It". At the end of the year, The Baltimore Banner included Rican's "Ain't Going Back" as one of the "20 Best Rap and R&B Songs of 2022". Rican signed to BuVision Entertainment/Out The Jungle and Columbia Records.

She then released singles "Uh Ohh" and "Dumb" in 2023; the latter featured Moneybagg Yo. She participated in a Red Bull Spiral cypher in 2023, alongside fellow rappers Gloss Up and Lady XO.
