= Morris Heights Health Center =

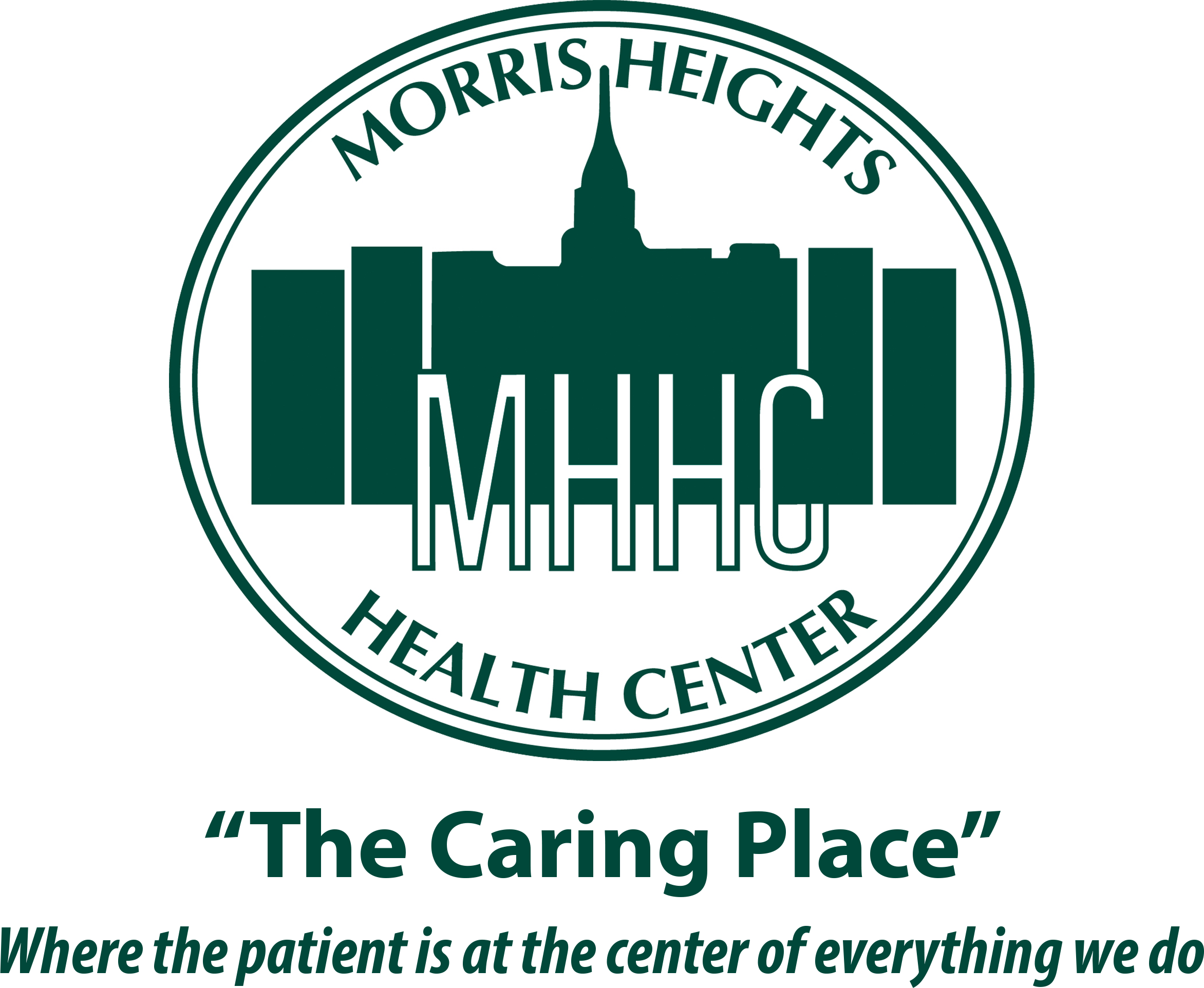
- Founder: Verona Greenland (President & CEO from 1981 to 2015)
- Legal status: 501(c)(3) Non-Profit
- Headquarters: 85 West Burnside Avenue Bronx, NY 10453
- Location: Bronx, New York
- Coordinates: 40.854814°N 73.910151°W
- Services: Primary Care, Dental, Mental Health, Specialty Services, Extended Care Services,
- Staff: 550+
- Website: www.mhhc.org

Morris Heights Health Center (MHHC) is a Federally Qualified Health Center that provides primary care, specialty services, dental and behavioral health services in the Bronx, New York City. MHHC operates across 30 sites including 19 school based sites.

== History ==
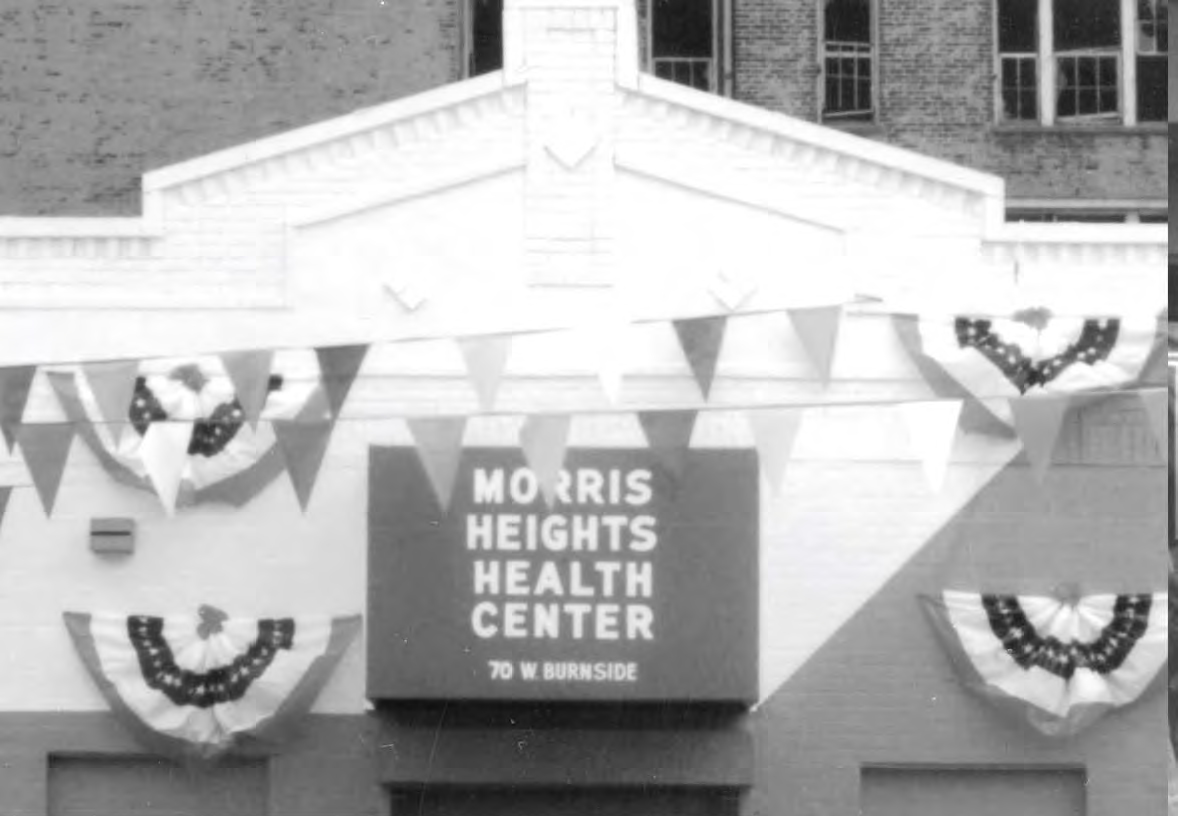
The first Morris Heights site (Women's Health Pavilion) officially opened in March 1981.

In March, 1981, Founder Verona Greenland opened the first Morris Heights Health Center (MHHC) site, with the assistance of a $25,000 Neighborhood Improvement grant on 70 West Burnside Avenue. In its first year MHHC provided health care services to over 2,000 individuals and families.

MHHC is one of the first community health centers in the nation that initiated the comprehensive HIV program model on which the Ryan White HIV is predicated. MHHC also provided an out-of-hospital childbearing center solely run by midwives, which saw reductions in the community's infant mortality rate; while providing a homelike birthing experience for several thousand women. Lastly, MHHC is one of the first Federally Qualified Health Center (FQHC) in New York City to be accredited by the Joint Commission. The center recently constructed a $50 million, six-story facility at 57-69 West Burnside Avenue. Utilizing a combination of advocacy, low income tax credit and 202 funding from the United States Department of Housing and Urban Development, Morris Heights Health Center was able to build a 71-unit senior housing building. Morris Heights Health Center serves approximately 52,000 patients annually.

== Sites ==
=== Burnside ===
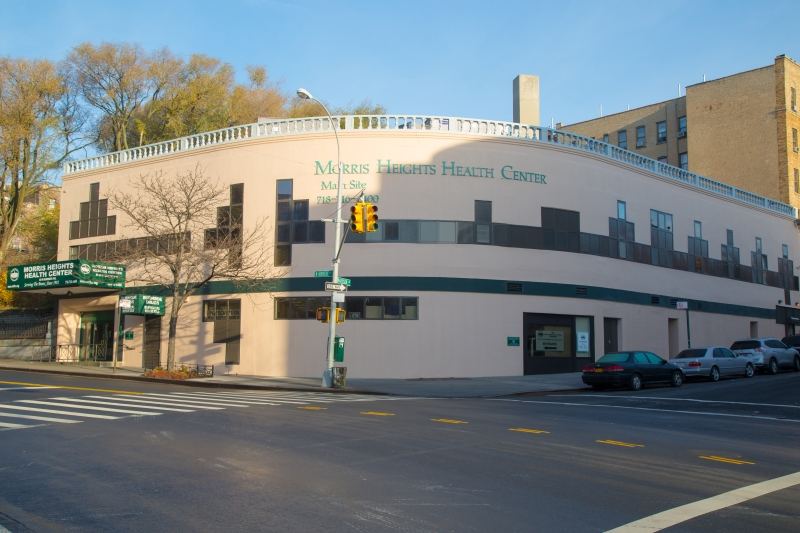
Burnside Avenue Site (Main)

In May, 1987, the Center opened its 33,000-square-foot headquarters at 85 West Burnside. The location was previously the site the RKO Theater, next as the Burnside Manor catering hall, a school, and eventually serving as the center's main primary healthcare site.

=== Women's Health Pavilion ===
The first Morris Heights Health Center location opened its doors in March 1981 at 70 West Burnside Avenue, now known as the Women's Health Pavilion. It first began as a childbearing and birthing center that served over 3,500 patients a year, and now handles a broader range of women's health issues.

=== Harrison Circle ===
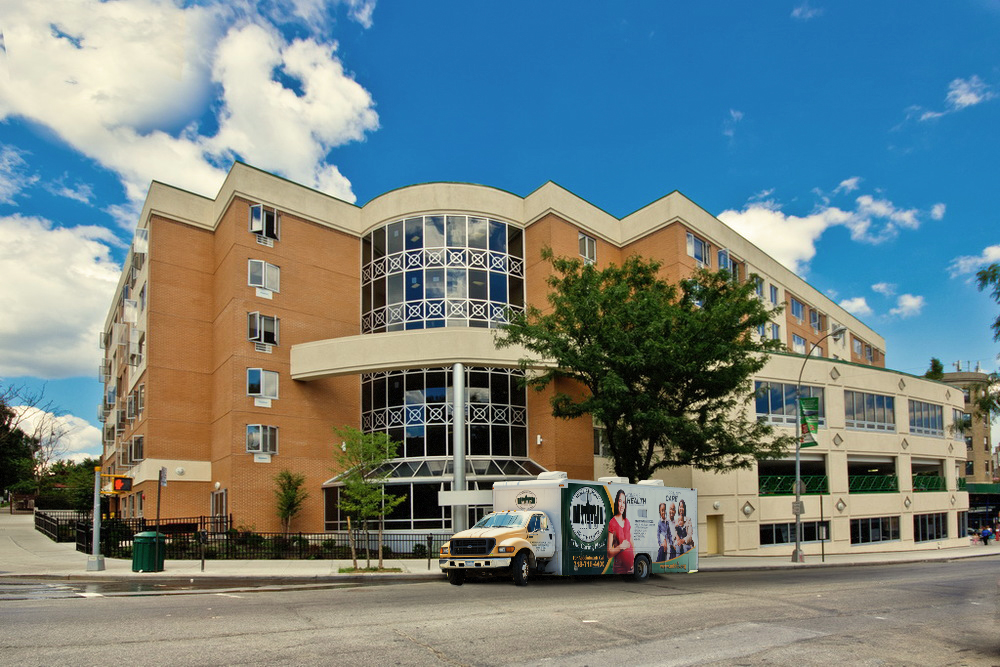
Morris Heights Health Center: Harrison Circle Site

In 2010, the six story, 112,000-sq. foot facility opened its doors. The facility holds 71 unit housing center for seniors, and also houses Article 31 mental health services and several specialty services .

=== Walton ===
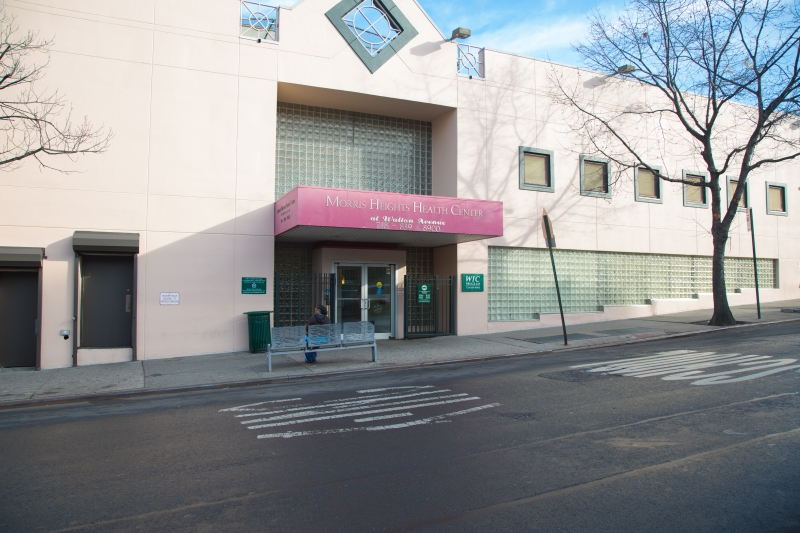
Walton Site

In 1997, MHHC opened a facility located at Walton Avenue and East 183rd Street.

=== 233rd ===
In April 2013, the center opened MHHC @ 233rd Street, a primary care health center at 825 E 233rd Street in the Borough of the Bronx. It had operated as the Pedro Espada Medical Center before closing in May 2012.

=== St. Ann's ===
In January 2004, the St. Ann's center opened at 625 East 137th Street at this location. The building was built in 1931.

=== Melrose ===
In March 2014, MHHC opened its seventh clinical site located at 779 Melrose Avenue Bronx, NY 10451.

=== School Based Health Centers ===
The center's School Based Health Program operates 19 school based health centers in NYC Department of Education locations in the Bronx. Each includes a primary care provider, a social worker and a medical assistant, as well as a health educator and dentist in some locations.

== Leadership ==
Mari G. Millet serves as the president and chief executive officer of Morris Heights Health Center.
