= Jason D. Hill =

Jamaican-American professor of philosophy

Jason Damian Hill (born c. 1965) is a Jamaican-American professor of philosophy at DePaul University in Chicago.

== Childhood and career ==
Hill was born and grew up in Jamaica. He describes himself as "mixed race" in Caribbean terms, but "perceived as being black in America". He immigrated to the U.S. in 1985 when he was 20 years old, and eventually became a U.S. citizen. Hill has written extensively about his journey to the United States, most notably in his last book, We Have Overcome: An Immigrant's Letter to the American People. Hill, a gay man, has credited Ayn Rand's work with helping him come to terms with his homosexuality, especially as someone who grew up in Jamaica, a country he describes as "the most homophobic culture in the world".

After coming to the United States, Hill earned a B.A., magna cum laude, in philosophy from Georgia State University, and both an M.A. and PhD in philosophy from Purdue University, eventually becoming a professor and an Honors Distinguished Faculty member at DePaul University, where he teaches courses on ethics, political philosophy, and American politics. With regard to his intellectual principles, he has stated he is committed to moral foundationalism, moral universalism, and the absolutism of reason.

Politically, Hill has defined himself both as a conservative Democrat and as a conservative independent.

== Opinions and beliefs ==
=== On racism in the U.S. ===
Hill has written that he has experienced racism, but does not consider himself a victim, stating that "you encounter racism, you deal with it, address it and move on". In his book, We Have Overcome, he responds to Ta-Nehisi Coates' Between The World and Me, arguing that Coates' book "reads primarily like an American horror story and, I'm sorry to say, a declaration of war against my adopted country [the U.S.]". He has argued that the U.S. left promotes victimization of people of color and immigrants, telling them that "they are incontrovertibly oppressed by whites, that there's a new form of oppression since Donald Trump became president". He argues that it is not "resurgent racism" that has emerged after Trump's election, but rather "moral hysteria and hyperbole on the part of a far left that wants to paint racial minorities as helplessly under the yoke of white oppression".

=== On Israel ===
Hill is a supporter of Israel and has advocate that Israel annex the land gained by the Six-Day War. Critics among the students and faculty denounced his position and called for his censure. Hill has sued DePaul, claiming that it launched a "campaign of intimidation and demonization" based on account of his race and sexual orientation. The lawsuit was dismissed by the circuit court; Hill's appeal was dismissed by the appellate court in September 2024.

== Books ==
=== Nonfiction ===
- Civil Disobedience and the Politics of Identity: When We Should Not Get Along (Palgrave Macmillan, July 2013)
- Becoming a Cosmopolitan: What It Means to be a Human Being in the New Millennium (Rowman and Littlefield Publishing Group, 2000/paperback, 2011)
- Beyond Blood Identities: Post Humanity in the 21st Century (Rowman and Littlefield Publishing Group, November 2009)
- We Have Overcome: An Immigrant's Letter to the American People (Bombardier Books, July 10, 2018).
- What Do White Americans Owe Black People: Racial Justice in the Age of Post-Oppression (Emancipation Books, October 26, 2021) ISBN 978-1-64293-794-7

=== Fiction ===
- JAMAICA BOY IN SEARCH OF AMERICA (KDP Publishers, July 8, 2013)
