= Caribbean American Heritage Awards =

The Caribbean American Heritage Awards (CARAH) were established in 1994 to recognize and celebrate individuals "who have made outstanding contributions to American society, promoted Caribbean culture and interests in the United States, as well as to friends of the Caribbean." The annual awards ceremony is hosted by the Institute of Caribbean Studies in Washington, D.C.

For the first time since its inception, the 2020 awards ceremony was held virtually. Although initially announced as an awardee, musician Buju Banton was omitted from the 2020 awards. It was widely speculated that the organization rescinded the award after Banton spoke out against mask wearing during the COVID-19 pandemic.

== Marcus Garvey Lifetime Achievement Award ==
The Marcus Garvey Lifetime Achievement Award recognizes individuals of Caribbean or Caribbean-American descent who have been instrumental in the development or creation of an essential facet of Caribbean culture. In 2021, Jamaican sculptor Basil Watson received this prestigious award. Previous recipients are listed below:

- 2020: Judy Mowatt from Jamaica was recognized for her "significant impact on the reggae scene"
- 2019: Jamaican businessman and philanthropist Michael Lee-Chin, O.J.
- 2018: Jamaican actor, playwright and comedian Oliver Samuels, O.D. was recognized for his body of work in the performing arts
- 2017: Jamaican scientist and philanthropist Hon. Henry Lowe, O.J., Ph.D.
- 2016: Dr. Gerard Alphonse of Haiti, an electrical engineer, research scientist and prolific inventor
- 2013: Freddie McGregor, a Jamaican pioneer in ska and reggae music, was awarded for his accomplishments

== Other notable awardees ==
- CEO of GraceKennedy Group Don Wehby received the award for Outstanding Corporate Citizenship in 2020, the first CARAH award of its kind.
- Olympian Shelly-Ann Fraser-Pryce was recognized in 2020 for her achievements in track and field.
- Gramps Morgan, lead singer of Morgan Heritage, received the "Outstanding Contribution to Reggae Music" Award in 2019.
- Soca Artiste Machel Montano was recognized in 2016 for his contribution to soca music.
- International Reggae Artiste Maxi Priest was the recipient of the 2015 Luminary Award for his contribution to Reggae Music.
- Actress Cicely Tyson
- Reggae matriarch Rita Marley
- Susan Taylor, former Editor-in-Chief of Essence magazine
- Olympian sprinter and world record-holder Usain Bolt received the Vanguard in sports award in 2009

== List of recipients ==
=== Early years (1994–2010) ===
Year	Recipients and Award Details
1994	Hon. Una Clarke, Outstanding Community Service Kojo Nnamdi, Excellence in Journalism US Congressman Charles Rangel (D-NY), Marcus Garvey Lifetime Achievement Hon. Kweisi Mfume, Keynote Speaker & Outstanding Political Leadership
1995	Maureen Bunyan, Excellence in Journalism Bertram Fraser-Reid, Ph.D., Excellence in Science Ivan Sertima, Ph.D., Outstanding Community Service Geoffrey Holder, Excellence in the Arts Earl Graves, Jr., Keynote Speaker & Marcus Garvey Lifetime Achievement
1996	G.E. Morris Husbands, Ph.D., Excellence in Science Augusta Souza Kappner, Ph.D., Outstanding Contribution in Education Bert N. Mitchell, Marcus Garvey Lifetime Achievement Dalton A. Tong, Outstanding Contribution to Healthcare Hon. C. Delores Tucker, Outstanding Community Service US Congresswoman Maxine Waters (D-CA), Outstanding Political Leadership Prime Minister Owen Arthur of Barbados, Keynote Speaker
1997	Hon. Dame Eugenia Charles, Marcus Garvey Lifetime Achievement Deputy US Attorney General, Eric Holder, Jr., Outstanding Public Service CCH Pounder, Excellence in the Arts Randall Robinson, Outstanding Community Service US Congressman Edolphus Towns (D-NY), Outstanding Political Leadership Ralph O. Williams, Outstanding Contribution in Healthcare
1998	Farley Cleghorne, M.D., Excellence in Medicine Hon. Veronica Airey-Wilson, Outstanding Community Service Lowell Hawthorne, Outstanding Entrepreneurship Edwidge Danticat, Excellence in the Arts Niara Sudarkasa, Ph.D., Marcus Garvey Lifetime Achievement US Congressman Albert Wynn (D-MD), Outstanding Political Leadership Prime Minister Kenny Anthony of St. Lucia, Keynote Speaker
1999	Hon. Christopher R. Thomas, Excellence in Diplomacy Winston Clive-Victor Parris, M.D., Excellence in Medicine Patricia Isaacs-Green, Outstanding Entrepreneurship Hon. Wilma Lewis, Excellence in Public Service Walt W. Braithwaite, Outstanding Contributions in Corporate America Ernest ‘Ernie’ Ranglin, Marcus Garvey Lifetime Achievement
2000	Irving Burgie, Marcus Garvey Lifetime Achievement Grace Cornish, Ph.D., Outstanding Community Service Velma Scantlebury, M.D., Excellence in Medicine Dumas Simeus, Outstanding Entrepreneurship Curtis N. Symonds, Outstanding Contribution to Corporate America Neil Jones, Excellence in Science and Technology Jair Lynch, Excellence in Sports
2001	Marva Allen, Outstanding Community Service Hon. Dr. Slinger ‘The Mighty Sparrow’ Francisco, Marcus Garvey Lifetime Achievement Ann Rubena Guscott, Spirit of the Caribbean Centenary Award US Congressman Major Owens, Outstanding Political Leadership Don Rojas, Excellence in Journalism C. Sherman Severin, Ph.D., Excellence in Science and Technology Yolanda Simmons, Outstanding Contribution to Healthcare Aubrey Stephenson, Outstanding Entrepreneurship
2002	Hon. Diane Abbott, M.P. Great Britain, Trailblazer US Congressman John Conyers, Outstanding Political Leadership Jocelyn Dow, Outstanding Contribution to International Development Norge Jerome, Ph.D., Excellence in Education Elliott ‘Ellie’ Mannette, Marcus Garvey Lifetime Achievement Von Martin, Excellence in Journalism Robert Rashford, Excellence in Science and Technology Errol Service, Outstanding Entrepreneurship
2003	Sir George Alleyne, Marcus Garvey Lifetime Achievement Hon. Jean Augustine, Trailblazer Carole ‘Sister Carole” East, Outstanding Contribution to Reggae Music Dawnn Lewis, Excellence in the Arts Elizabeth Nunez, Ph.D., Outstanding Contribution to Literature Jeffrey Thompson, Outstanding Entrepreneurship Ronald Williams, Ph.D., Excellence in Education Hon. Andrew Young, Outstanding Public Service
2004	Sydney F.C. Barnwell, M.D., Outstanding Contribution to Healthcare James ‘Jimmy Cliff’ Chambers, Marcus Garvey Lifetime Achievement Chris and Randy Chin, Outstanding Entrepreneurship US Congresswoman Donna Christensen, Outstanding Political Leadership Hon. Angela King, Excellence in Diplomacy Caryl Phillips, Excellence in Literature Ernesta Procope, Trailblazer Rene John Sandy, Excellence in Journalism Cicely Tyson, Luminary Prime Minister Dr. Keith Mitchell of Grenada, Keynote Speaker Wendy Fitzwilliam, Miss Universe 1998, Host
2005	Edward Braithwaite, Marcus Garvey Lifetime Achievement Alphonsus ‘Arrow’ Cassell, Trailblazer Emmanuel and Jean Cherubin, Outstanding Community Service Vincent HoSang, Outstanding Entrepreneurship George Hulse, Outstanding Corporate Leadership Nekisha Mohan, Excellence in Journalism Richard ‘Richie’ Richardson, Excellence in Sports Thelma Thompson, Ph.D., Excellence in Education Hon. Dr. Michael Misick, Premier of Turks & Caicos, Keynote Speaker
2006	Justice Sylvia Hinds-Radix, Excellence in Public Service US Congresswoman Barbara Lee, Outstanding Political Leadership Ambassador Carlton Masters, Outstanding Entrepreneurship Tracy Neale, Excellence in Journalism McCartha Linda ‘Calypso Rose’ Sandy-Lewis, Marcus Garvey Lifetime Achievement Susan Taylor, Trailblazer Prime Minister Dr. Denzil Douglas of St. Kitts & Nevis, Keynote Speaker
2007	Frank Ross, Marcus Garvey Lifetime Achievement Dr. Muriel Petioni, Forerunner Raymond Goulbourne, Outstanding Contribution to Corporate America John Blake, Excellence in Media Maria Kong, Outstanding Community Service Cardinal Warde, Ph.D., Excellence in Science and Technology Dr. Solanges Vivens, Outstanding Entrepreneurship George C. Fraser, Trailblazer Frederick ‘Toots’ Hibbert, Luminary
2008	Hon. Neil O. Albert, Outstanding Public Service Andrew Ballen, Vanguard in Entrepreneurship Ato Boldon, Excellence in Sports Garth Graham, M.D., M.P.H., Outstanding Contribution to Public Health Hon. Marcia Griffith, O.D., Luminary Dr. Cato Laurencin, Excellence in Science and Technology Hon. Beryl Levi, O.D., Marcus Garvey Lifetime Achievement Karl B. Rodney and Faye A. Rodney, Outstanding Community Service Hon. Helen Marshall, Outstanding Political Leadership Egbert L.J. Perry, Outstanding Entrepreneurship
2009	Hon. Shirley Nathan-Pulliam, Marcus Garvey Lifetime Achievement Willard Wigan, M.B.E., Luminary George Willie, Outstanding Entrepreneurship Hon. Usain Bolt, O.D., Vanguard in Sports Alison Hinds, Outstanding Contribution to Soca Music Lynton G. Scotland, Outstanding Contribution to Corporate America
2010	Hon. Rita Marley, O.D., Marcus Garvey Lifetime Achievement Joy Stephenson, Trailblazer Dr. Roy A. Hastick, Outstanding Community Service Joseph Baptiste, D.D.S., Outstanding Social Entrepreneurship K. David Boyer, Outstanding Contribution to Corporate America Wayne Frederick, M.D., Vanguard in Medicine Hon. Marie St. Fleur, Outstanding Political Leadership Sir Edward Cheung, Ph.D., Excellence in Science and Technology Michael Blake, Deputy Director, White House Office of Public Engagement, Special Guest Speaker

=== Recent awardees (2011–2021) ===
Year	Recipients	Country of Heritage	Award Details
2011	Rev. Neville Callam	Jamaica	Luminary Award
2011	Maryse Condé	Guadeloupe	Award for Excellence in Literature
2011	Frank L. Douglas, M.D. Ph.D.	Guyana	Award for Outstanding Entrepreneurship
2011	Garth Fagan	Jamaica	Marcus Garvey Lifetime Achievement
2011	Hazelle Goodman	Trinidad and Tobago	Excellence in the arts
2011	Arlie Petters	Belize	Excellence in science and technology
2011	Larry Quinlan	St. Kitts and Nevis	Outstanding Contribution to Corporate America
2011	Janet Rollé	Jamaica	Trailblazer
2012	Hon. Monty Alexander, O.D.	Jamaica	Luminary
2012	Anya Ayoung-Chee	Trinidad and Tobago	Vanguard
2012	Colin Channer	Jamaica	Excellence in literature
2012	William ‘Bunny Rugs’ Clarke	Jamaica	Cultural Ambassador
2012	Dean Garfield	Jamaica	Outstanding contribution to corporate America
2012	Robert Greenidge	Trinidad and Tobago	Marcus Garvey Lifetime Achievement
2012	Shaka Hislop	Trinidad and Tobago	Excellence in sports
2012	Andy Ingraham	Bahamas	Trailblazer
2012	Constance C. R. White	Jamaica	Excellence in journalism
2013	Camille Wardrop Alleyne Ed.D	Trinidad and Tobago	Excellence in science and technology
2013	Leanna Archer	Haiti	Visioneur Award
2013	Etienne Charles	Trinidad and Tobago	Trailblazer
2013	Guy Harvey, Ph.D.	Jamaica	Luminary
2013	Jimmy Jean-Louis	Haiti	Excellence in the Arts
2013	Hon. Frederick (Freddy) McGregor O.D.	Jamaica	Marcus Garvey Lifetime Achievement
2013	Shala Monroque	St. Lucia	Vanguard
2013	Deborah Persaud, M.D.	Guyana	Outstanding contribution to medicine
2013	Kim Watson	Jamaica	Outstanding community service
2014	Gowton Achaibar		Outstanding contribution to corporate America
2014	Roger Bobb		Trailblazer
2014	Dr. Robert France		Excellence in science and technology
2014	Jeff Haynes		Excellence in the arts
2014	Carol Maraj	Trinidad and Tobago	
2014	Dr. Rudy Moise		Outstanding entrepreneurship
2014	Dr. Mortimer Neufville		Outstanding contribution to education; Marcus Garvey Lifetime Achievement
2014	Major General Vincent R. Stewart		Outstanding public service
2015	Beverley East	Jamaica	Forerunner
2015	Barbara Hutchinson M.D., Ph.D	Trinidad and Tobago	Excellence in medicine
2015	Gordon Henderson	Haiti	Trailblazer
2015	Lt. Col. Shawna Rochelle Kimbrell		Vanguard
2015	Maxi Priest	Jamaica	Luminary
2015	Magdalah Racine-Silva	Haiti	Outstanding entrepreneurship
2015	Miguel Southwell	Antigua and Barbuda	Outstanding Public Service
2015	Michael Thompson	Jamaica	Outstanding Community Service
2016	Gabriel Abed	Barbados	Vanguard
2016	Dr. Gerard Alphonse	Haiti	Marcus Garvey Lifetime Achievement
2016	Dr. Goulda Downer	Jamaica	Outstanding Contributions to Public Health
2016	Ambassador Dr. Edward Greene	Guyana	Outstanding public service
2016	David Hochoy	Trinidad and Tobago	Excellence in the arts
2016	Machel Montano	Trinidad and Tobago	Luminary
2016	Victoria Rowell	Jamaica	Trailblazer
2017	Dr. Glendon Archer	Guyana	Outstanding entrepreneurship
2017	Dr. Clive Callender	Barbados	Excellence in medicine
2017	Hon. Jennifer Carroll	Trinidad and Tobago	Trailblazer
2017	Congressman Eliot Engel	Friend of the Caribbean	Outstanding political leadership
2017	Hon. Henry Lowe, O.J., Ph.D.	Jamaica	Marcus Garvey Lifetime Achievement
2017	Nneka Norville	Guyana	Vanguard
2017	Hon. Karl Racine	Haiti	Forerunner
2017	Bevil Wooding	Trinidad and Tobago	Excellence in science and technology
2017	Etana	Jamaica	Excellence in the arts
2018	Jerry Butler	Bahamas	Outstanding public service
2018	Alyson Cambridge	Guyana	Vanguard
2018	Dr. Andre Cropper	Trinidad and Tobago	Excellence in science and technology
2018	Tony Harris	Guyana	Forerunner
2018	Sherry Herbert	St. Kitts and Nevis	Outstanding contribution to corporate America
2018	Hon. Oliver Samuels, O.D.	Jamaica	Marcus Garvey Lifetime Achievement
2018	Jean-Claude Legagneur	Haiti	Excellence in the arts
2018	Inner Circle Reggae Band	Jamaica	Luminary
2019	Evens Charles	Haiti	Outstanding Entrepreneurship
2019	Dr. Kingsley Chin, M.D.	Jamaica	Excellence in Medicine
2019	Donnette Cooper	Jamaica	Forerunner
2019	Andre Fenton, Ph.D.	Guyana	Excellence in science and technology
2019	Hon. Michael Lee-Chin, O.J.	Jamaica	Marcus Garvey Lifetime Achievement
2019	Dr. Winnette McIntosh-Ambrose	Trinidad and Tobago	Trailblazer
2019	Gramps Morgan	Jamaica	Outstanding contribution to Reggae music
2019	Euzhan Palcy	Martinique	Luminary
2019	Erwin Raphael	Dominica	Outstanding contribution to corporate America
2020	Anaya Lee Willabus	Guyana	Visioneur
2020	Andrea McKenzie	Trinidad and Tobago	Vanguard
2020	Michele L Jawando	Bermuda/ Jamaica	Outstanding contribution to corporate America
2020	Dr Swinburne Augustine	Dominica	Outstanding contribution to public health
2020	Rt. Honourable David Lammy	Guyana	Outstanding political leadership
2020	Shelly-Ann Fraser-Pryce	Jamaica	Excellence in sports
2020	Senator Don Wehby	Jamaica	Outstanding corporate leadership
2020	Judy Mowatt	Jamaica	Marcus Garvey Lifetime Achievement
2020	Frederick A Morton	US Virgin Islands/ Nevis	Trailblazer
2020	Dr Nicholas Brathwaite	Grenada	Excellence in science and technology
2021	Lloyd Carney	Jamaica	Outstanding entrepreneurship
2021	Dr. Cindy M.P. Duke	Trinidad and Tobago	Forerunner
2021	Gordon Chambers	Jamaica	Luminary
2021	Vidia Roopchand	Guyana	Excellence in science and technology
2021	Wanda Tima	Haiti	Outstanding community service
2021	Hon. Basil Watson	Jamaica	Marcus Garvey Lifetime Achievement
2021	Justina Nixon-Saintil	Dominica	Trailblazer
2021	Jason Mars	Guyana	Vanguard
2021	Daynia La-Force	St. Lucia	Excellence in sports
2021	Black Violin (Wilner “Wil B” Baptiste and Kevin “Kev Marcus” Sylvester)	Haiti, Dominica	Excellence in the arts
2022	Dr. Trisha Bailey	Jamaica	Luminary
2022	Eric Adolphe		Excellence in science and technology
2022	Josanne Francis	Trinidad and Tobago	Vanguard
2022	Stacy Mollison	Guyana	Outstanding Corporate Social Responsibility
2022	Dwight Thanos Smith	Jamaica	
2022	Carol Davis-Boyce	Trinidad and Tobago	Outstanding Scholarship in African Diaspora Studies
2022	Ainsley Gill	Trinidad and Tobago	Trailblazer
2022	Bihari Lall	Trinidad and Tobago	Outstanding Entrepreneur
2023	Team Antigua Island Girls	Antigua & Barbuda	Forerunner
2023	Stuart Archibald	St. Vincent & the Grenadines	Outstanding Contribution to Corporate America
2023	Michael Blake	Jamaica	Outstanding Public Service
2023	Leah Marville	Barbados	Vanguard
2023	Richie Etwaru	Guyana	Excellence in Science and Technology
2023	Cleve Mesidor	Haiti	Outstanding Social Entrepreneurship
2023	Jacky Wright	Jamaica	Trailblazer
2023	Lincoln Phillips	Trinidad & Tobago	Marcus Garvey Lifetime Achievement Award for Excellence in Sports
2023	Stephen 'Cat' Coore	Jamaica	Luminary
