= Cyril Sisnett =

Cyril Sisnett may refer to:

- Cyril G. Sisnett (1875–1934), plantation owner in Barbados
- Cyril Sisnett (1909/1910–1984), plantation manager and company director in Barbados, see murder of Cyril Sisnett
