= CGAP (Thinktank) =

American think tank

CGAP (Consultative Group to Assist the Poor) is a Washington, D.C.–based think tank that promotes financial inclusion. As an international public-private partnership, it is supported by more than 35 national and international development organisations and corporate foundations from the financial and IT sectors. Its stated aim is to improve the lives of the poor. CGAP stands for Consultative Group to Assist the Poor, which is rarely used in full form. CGAP aims to achieve its goal by analysing and promoting commercial business models that enable the financial, IT and telecommunications sectors to reach as many people as possible with digital financial services, especially the poor.

The World Bank provides the space and secretariat for CGAP, but its administrative and financial structure is independent of the World Bank. In addition to governmental and intergovernmental development organisations (including KfW, GIZ and the German Federal Ministry for Economic Cooperation and Development), major US corporate foundations from the financial and IT sectors are key members (Citi Foundation, Dell Foundation, Gates Foundation, Mastercard Foundation, Metlife Foundation, Omidyar Network). Since April 2019, Jason Lamb of the Bill & Melinda Gates Foundation has chaired CGAP's Executive Committee. Greta Bull stepped down in July 2021 as Chief Executive Officer and was replaced by Sophie Sirtaine.

== History and evolution programme priorities ==
CGAP was established in 1995, under a slightly different name Consultative Group to Assist the Poorest, in promoting and managing the microcredit sector. Its self-imposed goals were to promote the institutional development and commercialisation of the sector and to improve the regulatory environment. In the early 2000s, CGAP changed its name to the Consultative Group to Assist the Poor.

The founding members were the World Bank and nine other governmental and international development organisations. The World Bank is the initiator and main funder, although its share of the budget has steadily declined, falling below 20 per cent in 2013.

CGAP was instrumental in establishing the concept of financial inclusion and formulating its agenda. Since 2008, CGAP has increasingly replaced the almost exclusive use of the term microfinance with the term financial inclusion. This term describes the increased use of and improved access for all people to cashless, primarily digital, financial services in the formal financial sector.

At the invitation of the G20, CGAP played a key role in drafting the policy paper for the G20 Global Partnership for Financial Inclusion (GPFI) in 2010.

The new terminology in the goal was also intended to reflect a change in the focus of the programme, which was linked to microcredit over-indebtedness crises in India, Bosnia-Herzegovina, Morocco, Nicaragua and Pakistan, among others. These erupted from around 2008 because commercial microfinance providers had been very aggressive in pushing high-cost loans onto the market without adequately assessing the ability of their poor clients to repay them. CGAP's priority should, therefore, no longer be access to credit and other services but the responsible provision of these services.

== Collaboration and membership overlap ==
CGAP is a key implementing partner of the G20 Global Partnership for Financial Inclusion (GPFI).

In 2012, CGAP's corporate foundation members and CGAP member the United Nations Capital Development Fund (UNCDF) formed the Better Than Cash Alliance, which is also a key implementing partner of the GPFI. The Alliance promotes the digitisation of payments and the reduction of the use of cash as part of the overall goal of financial inclusion. In addition to the UNCDF, core members of both groups include the Gates Foundation, the Mastercard Foundation, the Omidyar Network and the Citi Foundation.

There are also close links and collaboration with the Alliance for Financial Inclusion (AFI), which is funded by the Gates Foundation, a member of CGAP. AFI is also an implementing partner of the GPFI. This network of senior central bankers and financial regulators in developing and emerging markets aims to help them improve access to and use of modern, cashless financial services by the previously underserved.

Many governments and international organisations are members of several of these groups. The German Development Cooperation (GIZ) provides the secretariat for the AFI and is a member of CGAP.

From 2006 until 2014, the CGAP-Ford Graduation Program assisted local organizations with the implementation of ten different graduation pilot programs in eight countries. In 2016, the program published findings that proposed how to adequately support the governments' adaptation and implementation of graduation programs.
