= Alissandra Cummins =

Barbadian art historian (born 1958)

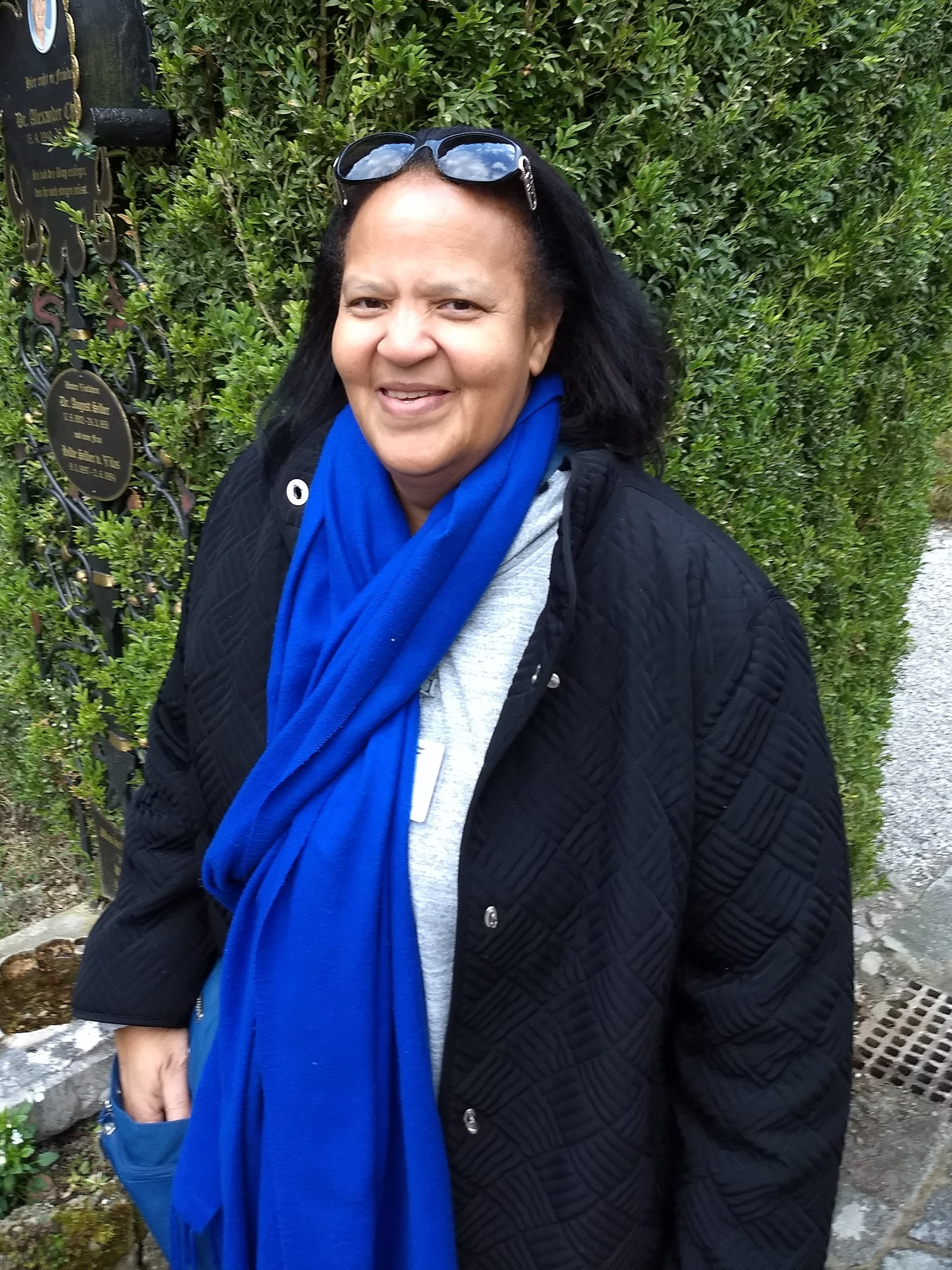
Alissandra Cummins, leading expert on Caribbean heritage.

Alissandra Cummins (born 30 October 1958) is a Barbadian art historian, educator, and scholar; she is a leading expert on Caribbean heritage, museum development, and art. Cummins is Director of the Barbados Museum & Historical Society and she is a lecturer in Museum and Heritage Studies at the University of the West Indies. She is board chair of International Journal of Intangible Heritage. She is on the board of the International Coalition of Sites of Conscience, and the International Journal of Museum Management and Curatorship. She was the Chairperson of the UNESCO Executive Board, from 2011 to 2013.

== Biography ==
She was educated at Queen's College, Barbados, the University of East Anglia (BA degree, History of Art) and the University of Leicester (MA degree, Museum Studies).

Alissandra Cummins served in lead positions for several intergovernmental committees and NGOs, in particular she was Chairperson of the Advisory Committee of the International Council of Museums, and successively President of the organization (2004-2010). As such she was the first even female president of the organization and the first to serve from the Caribbean region. Within UNESCO, Alissandra Cummins was a member of the Executive Board for two mandates, and between 2009-2011 she was elected as Chairperson of the Board’s Finance and Administrative Commission. Most recently she also chaired the Administrative Commission during the 36th session of the General Conference of UNESCO.

Within the cultural programmes and conventions of UNESCO Alissandra Cummins acted as Chairperson of the Intergovernmental Committee for Promoting the Return of Cultural Property to its Country of Origin or its Restitution in Case of Illicit Appropriation (ICPRCP) (2003-2005), as Chairperson of the International Advisory Committee of UNESCO' Memory of the World Programme (2007-2009) and she was Vice-President of the Intergovernmental Committee for the Protection of the World natural and Cultural Heritage (2009, 2011).

== Selected publications ==
- Curating in the Caribbean, The Green Box, Berlin 2012 (ed. with David A. Bailey MBE, Axel Lapp, Allison Thompson). ISBN 978-3-941644-32-8
- Art in Barbados, Ian Randle Publishers, Jamaica 1999, (ed. with Allison Thompson, Nick Whittle). ISBN 978-9-768123-82-4
