= Wehby =

Wehby is a surname. Notable people with the surname include:

- Don Wehby (1963–2025), Jamaican businessman and politician
- Monica Wehby (born 1962), American physician and politician
