= Jeena Chatrani =

Barbadian painter

- Education: University of Toronto
- Known for: Painting

Jeena Chatrani is a Barbadian painter. Her portrait of Barbados National Hero, Garfield Sobers is held in the collection of the Cricket Legends of Barbados and her paintings of sea turtles, including an exhibition of the paintings held at the Embassy of Argentina in Barbados, has raised funds for sea turtle conservation.

== Education ==
Chatrani was educated at St Gabriel's Primary, Queen's College (Barbados), the Barbados Community College and the University of Toronto (Canada). She graduated from the University of Toronto with a double major in Architectural Design and Fine Art History, and a minor in Visual Studies.

== Awards ==
During 2008 to 2016, Chatrani has received several awards from the National Independence Festival of Creative Arts (NIFCA) of Barbados.

== Major works & events ==
=== Sir Gary on the Green (2015) ===
In 2015, Chatrani created a 60"x60" painting of Garfield Sobers using palette knives. The artwork was donated by Chatrani to the Charitable Trust of Sandy Lane, and raised US$130,000 for charity during an auction hosted by the Sandy Lane Charitable Trust. The winning bid was made by Sir Martyn Arbib, who then gifted the artwork to Sobers. Sir Garfield Sobers subsequently donated the piece to the Cricket Legends of Barbados Museum.

On 4 February 2016, the painting was unveiled by Sobers and Chatrani during a ceremony at the museum, which was attended by former cricketers Desmond Haynes, Charlie Griffith, Cammie Smith, Vasbert Drakes, and former Minister of Tourism of Barbados Wes Hall.

Gary Sobers described the piece as "simply amazing".

=== The Gift of Flight (2019) ===
In 2019, during an event which celebrated British Airways' 65th anniversary of flying to Barbados, Chief Executive Officer of the Barbados Tourism Marketing Inc (BTMI), William “Billy” Griffith presented BA Executive and Head of Gatwick Commercial Graeme Connor with a painting entitled the “Gift of Flight” by Jeena Chatrani. The painting illustrates an iconic Barbadian flying fish soaring over the ocean which symbolically represents British Airways’ aircraft flying over the ocean between Barbados and the UK.

=== Saving the Sea Turtles (2019) ===
Chatrani showcased 20 of her art pieces at her exhibition entitled "Saving the Sea Turtles", which was hosted by Ambassador Gustavo Martinez Pandiani of the Embassy of Argentina in Bridgetown, Barbados. Attendees included the Minister of Culture John King, the Minister of Labour Colin Jordan, Massy CEO Glenn Taylor, Apes Hill Director Linda Williams, The Nation CEO Anthony Shaw, Miss Universe Barbados Meghan Theobalds, and Dame Maizie Irene Barker-Welch. The exhibition was designed to raise funds and awareness for the Barbados Sea Turtle Project, which monitors the nesting and hatching of the endangered Hawksbill and Leatherback sea turtles.
