= David Benedict =

American college sports administrator

Current position
- Title: Athletic director
- Team: UConn
- Conference: Big East

Biographical details
- Born: Tempe, Arizona, U.S.
- Education: Southern Utah University

Administrative career (AD unless noted)
- 1996–2006: Arizona State University (associate director of development and executive director of the Sun Angels Foundation)
- 2007–2010: Long Beach State (assistant AD)
- 2010–2012: VCU (executive assistant AD, interim AD)
- 2012–2014: Minnesota (deputy AD)
- 2014–2016: Auburn (COO of athletic department)
- 2016–present: UConn

David Benedict is the athletic director at the University of Connecticut. Under his aegis, UConn won consecutive men's NCAA basketball championships in 2023 and 2024, and the women's championship in 2025.

== Early life and education ==
Benedict is a native of Tempe, Arizona. He had his start in sports as a ball boy for Mesa Community College (MCC) football team in Mesa, Arizona, where his father coached. After high school he played center and linebacker at MCC, after his father had left the program. A 1995 graduate of Southern Utah University, he played linebacker on the football team. He graduated with a degree in physical education, and obtained a master's degree in sports management from New Mexico Highlands in 1996, where he was a graduate assistant football coach.

== Sports management career ==
Benedict got his start in sports management in 1996 at Arizona State University. He was initially hired for only a single task, organizing the event dedicating and naming the football field for former coach Frank Kush. He impressed a top administrator and was offered a position. His first role there was as a "gofer...at the very bottom of the ranks." There until 2006, he advanced to being associate director of development and executive director of the fundraising Sun Angels Foundation. He left ASU to become assistant AD at Long Beach State; this was followed by a short detour into healthcare at Scottsdale Health Foundation. Returning to sports management in 2010, he was associate AD at VCU, overseeing fundraising and "development operations." In 2012 he became interim AD, leading the school's transition from the Colonial League to the Atlantic 10. This was followed by stints of two years each at Auburn University, where he was COO of the athletics department, and University of Minnesota. At Auburn, he was closely involved in interviewing and then hiring Bruce Pearl as basketball coach.

=== AD at UConn ===
In 2016 he was appointed AD at UConn; his time there has been "highly successful."

- The men's basketball team won back-to-back national championships in 2023 and 2024. Major moves by Benedict helped revitalize the "semi-dormant" basketball program; these included hiring Dan Hurley as coach in 2018 and orchestrating a complicated return to the Big East Conference in 2020.
- UConn Huskies women's basketball has maintained national prominence, and in 2024 he extended coach Auriemma's contract through 2029 providing stability for the program. In 2025 it won the NCAA championship.
- He hired Jim Mora in 2021, which revitalized the football program.
- State of the art facilities for baseball, softball and men's and women's hockey have been built.
- Department budget shortfalls have been wiped out. He negotiated a $96 million 15 year IMG renewal and multi-year extensions with Nike through the 2028–2029 academic year.
- There is a "dramatically upgraded" student-athlete center. This 80,000 square foot renovation was largely funded by Trisha Bailey, a 1999 UConn graduate. It will service UConn's 600 student-athletes and be home for six Olympic sports, five of which are women's programs.
- Benedict has "embraced" the NIL program in support of its student-athletes. UConn's use of NIL has had a positive impact on the men's basketball program.

== Personal ==
His wife, Lisa, was a two-time NCAA champion and four-time All-American gymnast at ASU; they have twin sons. His father, Allen, played football under Frank Kush at ASU and was a longtime football coach at Tempe High School and Mesa Community College before he got into athletic administration.
