= Church Village, Barbados =

Church Village
- Village
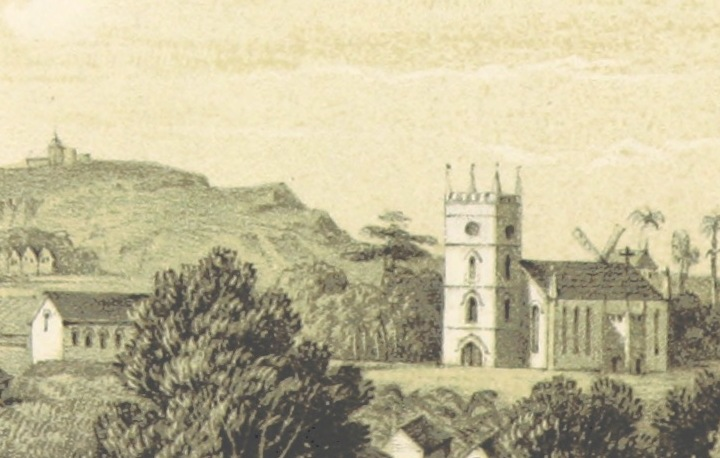
- Saint Philip's Parish Church in an 1848 image by W. L. Walton

- Map showing Church Village in Barbados
- Coordinates: 13°08′N 59°29′W
- Country: Barbados
- Parish: Saint Philip

Church Village is a village in the parish of Saint Philip in Barbados.

Saint Philip's Parish Church is located in the village. Indar Weir, Labour Party member and Minister for Agriculture and Food Security (as of October 2020) grew up in Church Village.
