= Jawando =

Jawando is a surname. Notable people with the surname include:

- Danielle Jawando (born 1988), English writer
- Michele Jawando, American nonprofit executive
- Will Jawando (born 1983), American politician
