= List of permanent secretaries (Barbados) =

Permanent secretaries are the chief executive officers of government ministries in Barbados and are responsible to the Head of the Public Service, who is Chairman of the Committee of Permanent Secretaries and Officers of Related Grade established by the Public Service Act, and to the Parliament of Barbados.

== List of government ministries, ministers and permanent secretaries ==
| Ministry | Minister Responsible | Permanent Secretary |
|---|---|---|
| Cabinet Office | The Honourable Mia Mottley, SC, MP (Prime Minister) | Ms. Selma Green, acting Cabinet Secretary |
| Prime Minister's Office | The Honourable Mia Mottley, SC, MP (Prime Minister) Dr. the Honourable William Duguid, JP, MP (Senior Minister in the Prime Minister's Office for Infrastructural Projects and Town Planning Matters) Senator The Honourable Shantal Munro-Knight, PhD (Minister in the Prime Minister's Office responsible for the Sustainable Development Goals, Commitment for Results and Culture) | The Most Honourable Alies Jordan, FB Ambassador Sandra Phillips (Special Assignment - Commitment For Results) Ms. Gabrielle Springer (Director General, Infrastructure) |
| Ministry of the Public Service | The Honourable Mia Mottley, SC, MP | Ms. Penelope Linton (acting) (Director General, Human Resources) |
| Ministry of Transport and Works | The Honourable Santia Bradshaw, M.P (Deputy Prime Minister) | Mr. Andrew Gittens |
| Ministry of Finance | The Honourable Mia Mottley, SC, MP The Honourable Ryan Straughn, M.P | Ms. Octavia Forde |
| Ministry of Economic Affairs and Investment | The Honourable Kay McConney, MP | Mr. Patrick McCaskie (acting) |
| Ministry of Foreign Affairs and Foreign Trade | The Honourable Kerrie Symmonds, M.P | Ambassador Joy-ann Skinner (acting) |
| Office of the Attorney General and Ministry of Legal Affairs | The Hon. Dale Marshall, SC, MP | Mr. Timothy Maynard |
| Ministry of Educational Transformation | Senator The Honourable Chad Blackman | Ms. Wendy Odle (acting) |
| Ministry of Training and Tertiary Education | The Honourable C. Sandra Husbands, MP | nil |
| Ministry of Home Affairs and Information | The Honourable Wilfred Abrahams, MP | Ms. Jenifer King (acting) |
| Ministry of Health and Wellness | Senator Dr. The Most Honourable Jerome Walcott, FB, JP, MBBS, FRCS | Mr. Wayne Marshall (acting) |
| Ministry of Agriculture and Food and Nutritional Security | The Honourable Indar Weir, MP | Mr. Terry Bascombe |
| Ministry of Labour, Social Security and Third Sector | The Honourable Colin Jordan, MP | Ms. Marva Howell (acting) |
| Ministry of Housing, Lands and Maintenance | The Honourable Dwight Sutherland, MP | Mr. H. Nikita Smith |
| Ministry of Energy and Business | Senator The Honourable Lisa Cummins | Mr. Kevin Hunte (acting) |
| Ministry of Tourism and International Transport | The Honourable Ian Gooding-Edghill, MP | Ms. Francine Blackman (acting) (Tourism) Mr. Charley Browne (acting) (International Transport) |
| Ministry of Youth, Sports and Community Empowerment | The Honourable Charles Griffith, MP | Ms. Joy Adamson (acting) |
| Ministry of People Empowerment and Elder Affairs | The Honourable Kirk Humphrey, MP | Mr. Jehu Wiltshire |
| Ministry of Environment and National Beautification, Green and Blue Economy | The Honourable Adrian Forde, MP | Ms. Yolande Howard |
| Ministry of Industry, Innovation, Science and Technology | Senator The Honourable Jonathan Reid | Ms. Claudette Hope-Greenidge (acting) |

== Members of the Committee of Permanent Secretaries and Officers of Related Grade ==
| Ministry or Organization | Position | Name |
|---|---|---|
| Office of the Head of the Public Service | Head of the Public Service | Mrs. Donna Cadogan (Chairman of the Committee) |
| Cabinet Office | Cabinet Secretary | Ms. Selma Green (acting) |
| Prime Minister's Office | Permanent Secretary Permanent Secretary (Special Assignment) | The Most Honourable Alies Jordan, FB Ambassador Sandra Phillips (Commitment For Results) |
| Ministry of the Public Service | Director General, Human Resources | Ms. Penelope Linton (acting) |
| Ministry of Transport and Works | Permanent Secretary | Mr. Andrew Gittens |
| Ministry of Finance, Economic Affairs and Investment Treasury Department Barbados Audit Office | Permanent Secretary Permanent Secretary Director General, Finance and Economic Affairs Accountant General Auditor General | Ms. Nancy Headley (Finance) Ms. Betty Alleyne-Headley (acting) (Economic Affairs and Investment) Mr. Ian Carrington Ms. Ingrid Blunt (acting) Mr. Leigh Trotman |
| Ministry of Foreign Affairs and Foreign Trade | Director General, Foreign Affairs and Foreign Trade Permanent Secretary and Head of the Foreign Service | Ambassador Donna Forde Ambassador Joy-Ann Skinner (acting) |
| Office of the Attorney General and Ministry of Legal Affairs Barbados Police Service | Permanent Secretary Chief Parliamentary Counsel Director of Public Prosecutions Solicitor General Registrar of the Supreme Court Commissioner of Police | Mr. Hughland Allman Ms. Shawn Belle (acting) Ms. Donna Babb-Agard, SC Ms. Anika Jackson, SC Ms. Sharon Deane (acting) Mr. Richard Boyce |
| Ministry of Education, Technological and Vocational Training | Permanent Secretary Chief Education Officer | Ms. Wendy Odle (acting) Ramona Archer-Bradshaw, PhD |
| Ministry of Home Affairs and Information | Permanent Secretary | Ambassador Yvette Goddard |
| Ministry of Health and Wellness | Permanent Secretary Chief Medical Officer | Mr. Wayne Marshall (acting) Dr. the Most Honourable Kenneth George, FB |
| Ministry of Agriculture and Food and Nutritional Security | Permanent Secretary Chief Agricultural Officer | Mr. Terry Bascombe (acting) |
| Ministry of Labour, Social Security and Third Sector | Permanent Secretary | Mr. Timothy Maynard |
| Ministry of Housing, Lands and Maintenance | Permanent Secretary Commissioner of Titles Commissioner of Titles | Mr. H. Nikita Smith (acting) Ms. Joy Green Ms. Beverley Gadsby, SC |
| Ministry of Energy and Business Development | Permanent Secretary | Mr. Kevin Hunte (acting) |
| Ministry of Tourism and International Transport | Permanent Secretary | Ms. Francine Blackman (acting) |
| Ministry of Youth, Sports and Community Empowerment | Permanent Secretary | Mr. Charley Browne (acting) |
| Ministry of People Empowerment and Elder Affairs | Permanent Secretary | Mr. Jehu Wiltshire |
| Ministry of Environment and National Beautification, Green and Blue Economy | Permanent Secretary | Ms. Yolande Howard |
| Ministry of Industry, Innovation, Science and Technology | Permanent Secretary | Ms. Marva Howell (acting) |
| n/a | Director General, Productive Sectors Director General, Governance Director General, Social and Environmental Policy | Louis Woodroffe, PhD Ms. Gail Atkins The Most Honourable Janet Phillips, FB |
