= Queen's College, St James =

Queen's College

Location
- Husbands; Barbados
- 13°8′44″N 59°37′26″W

Information
- Type: Public secondary school
- Motto: Fiat Lux (let there be light)
- Established: 1883; 143 years ago
- Principal: Mrs. Mitchell Maxwell
- Enrolment: approx. 2,000
- Colours: blue, red and white(school uniforms are grey, white and blue)
- Website: www.qcbarbados.com

Queen's College is a public secondary school in Barbados that was established in 1883. It is a multi-racial school with students drawn from a wide cross-section of the Barbadian community. It comprises eleven departments in which approximately thirty-three subject areas are taught.

Annually a high percentage of Queen's College graduates enter universities in the West Indies, Great Britain, Canada and the United States.

== History ==
Queen's College was established as a result of the recommendation of an Education Commission whose report suggested that Barbados required a first grade school for girls similar to that in the top educational institutions in Great Britain. The school commenced operations at Constitution Road in Bridgetown on 29 January 1883 with thirty-three female students. Their ages ranged from three to nineteen. The school was managed by a Board of Governors. The first headmistress was an Englishwoman, Helen Veich-Brown.

The school roll steadily increased, and in 1946 Elsie Pilgrim became the first female in Barbados to be awarded the Barbados Government Scholarship.

In 1970, Elsie Payne (née Pilgrim) became its first Barbadian headmistress, and during her tenure of office, co-education was introduced, when thirty-eight first form boys entered the school in 1980. After Dame Elsie Payne's retirement, Colleen Winter-Brathwaite was appointed headmistress of the school in 1985. She was followed by Coreen Kennedy in 1997. The school's first headmaster, Dr. David Browne was appointed in July 2008.

Queen's College existed as an all-girls school until 1981 when it became a co-educational secondary school. It relocated from Constitution Road to its present site in Husbands, St. James, in 1990. Queens College students are sorted into various classes or "forms" in their first year, named for the first 5 letters of the Greek alphabet: Alpha, Beta, Gamma, Delta, and Epsilon, where they remain until their 5th year. In their sixth year, should they choose to return, they are once again sorted into forms. However, at this time, selection is based on students' subject selection for the 6th form.

== Notable alumni ==
- Gabriel Abed, Ambassador of Barbados to the United Arab Emirates
- Esther Byer-Suckoo, Former Government MP
- Jeena Chatrani, Fine Artist
- Alissandra Cummins, Chair of UNESCO
- Shai Hope, West Indies ODI and T20 captain
- Daphne Joseph-Hackett
- Dame Sandra Mason, GCMG, DA, QC, President of Barbados
- Kay McConney, former Senator and Minister of Innovation, Science and Smart Technology; Minister of Education, Technological and Vocational Training
- Dame Billie Miller, Former Deputy Prime Minister
- Mia Mottley, Prime Minister
- Dame Elsie Payne, first female Barbados Scholar
- Monica Skeete (1923-1997), poet
- Dame Patricia Symmonds
- Elizabeth Thompson, former MP, Deputy President of the Senate
- Marion Vernese Williams, former Governor of the Central Bank of Barbados
- Emily Odwin, Professional Golfer
