= Garth Graham =

American cardiologist

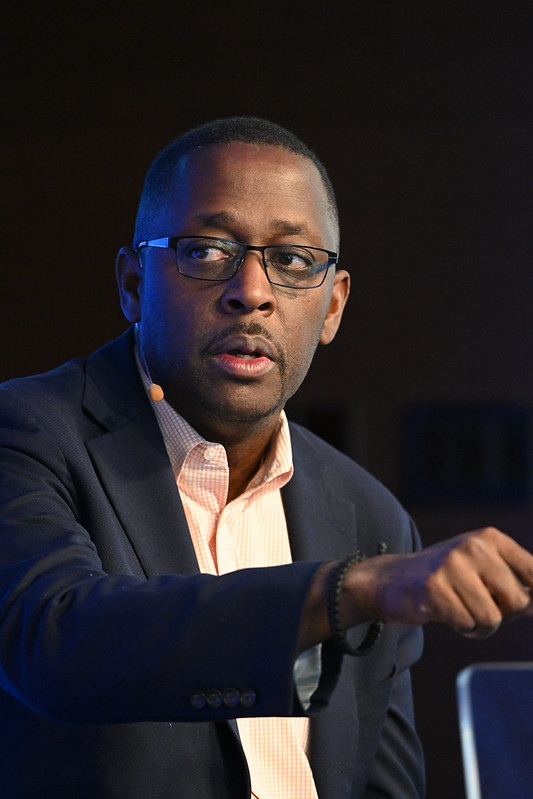
- Born: Garth Nicholas Graham
- Education: Florida International University (BS); Yale School of Medicine (MD); Yale School of Public Health (MPH)
- Occupations: Cardiologist; public health official; healthcare executive
- Known for: Health equity initiatives; digital health leadership; public health policy
- Awards: Caribbean American Heritage Award; Member, National Academy of Medicine
- Medical career
- Field: Cardiology, public health
- Institutions: Google for Health; YouTube Health; Harvard T.H. Chan School of Public Health

Garth N. Graham (born 1974-1975 in Kingston, Jamaica) is an American cardiologist, public health expert, tech and healthcare executive. He is a faculty member at the Harvard T.H. Chan School of Public Health and serves as the managing director and Global Head of Healthcare and Public Health at Google for Health, as well as the Head of YouTube Health. He is an elected member of the National Academy of Medicine.

== Early life and education ==
Graham attended Florida International University, where he earned a Bachelor of Science in biology. He subsequently attended the Yale School of Medicine, earning his MD, and the Yale School of Public Health, where he earned a MPH.

== Career ==
=== Public service ===
Graham served at the United States Department of Health and Human Services, including as Deputy Assistant Secretary for Health. In this role, he contributed to national initiatives addressing social determinants of health. He also served as a White House Fellow from 2003 to 2004 and as Special Assistant to the Secretary of Health and Human Services.

=== Academic roles ===
Graham served as an Assistant Dean for Health Policy and Chief of Health Services Research at the University of Florida School of Medicine. Since 2020, he has been a member of the faculty at the Harvard T.H. Chan School of Public Health.

=== Private sector leadership ===
Graham served as President of the Aetna Foundation, where he led philanthropic initiatives focused on community health and social determinants of health. He later became vice president and Chief Community Health Officer at CVS Health, overseeing national strategies related to community health, preventive care, and public health initiatives.

Graham joined Google Health as managing director and Global Head of Healthcare and Public Health, and Head of YouTube Health.

== Awards and honors ==
- 2001 – Alpha Omega Alpha Honor Medical Society, Yale School of Medicine
- 2008 – Caribbean American Heritage Award
- 2010 – Top 25 Minority Healthcare Executives, Modern Healthcare
- 2011 – Inaugural Credo Award, American College of Cardiology
- 2014 – Top Physician in Healthcare, Johns Hopkins University / BlackDoctor.org
- 2020 – Elected member, National Academy of Medicine
- 2021 – Elected member, Connecticut Academy of Science and Engineering
- 2021 – Honorary Doctor of Laws, Regis University
- 2021 – Satcher Health Leadership Institute at Morehouse School of Medicine established the Garth N. Graham Distinguished Lectureship Award to recognize individuals whose work advances health equity.
- 2024 – Honorary Doctor of Laws, Eastern Virginia Medical School
