= Cyril G. Sisnett =

- Born: Cyril Glenville Sisnett; 1875
- Died: 1934 (aged 58–59)
- Burial place: Saint Philip's Parish Church, Barbados
- Occupation: Plantation owner

Cyril Glenville Sisnett (1875-1934) was a plantation owner in Barbados. With his brother he owned Bayleys Plantation, Saint Philip, Barbados in 1913. He is buried in the graveyard of Saint Philip's Parish Church.

He should not be confused with Cyril Sisnett (c. 1910 - 1984) another plantation manager in Barbados.
