= Patricia Symmonds =

Barbadian politician (1925–2020)

Dame Olga Patricia Symmonds, GCM, DBE (18 October 1925 - 27 May 2020), best known as Patricia Symmonds, was a Barbadian politician, member of the Senate of Barbados and a former teacher.

The only daughter of Algernon French Symmonds and his wife, Olga (née Harper), she is the elder sister of Barbadian diplomat, Algernon Washington Symmonds. She was educated at Queen's College, Barbados, and travelled to the United Kingdom to study at the University of Reading and the Institute of Education.

As a teacher from 1945 to 1985, she was Deputy Principal of the St. Michael School, Saint Michael, Barbados from 1963 to 1976, then Principal of the school from 1976 to 1985. She was a part-time lecturer and tutor at Cave Hill Campus from 1963 to 1965.

Since 1994, she has been a Senator of Barbados and was a member of the Privy Council of Barbados from 1997 to 2000. She was created a Dame Commander of the Order of the British Empire in 2000.

== Sources ==
- Burke's Peerage & Gentry, 107th edition
- Dame Patricia dies
