= Daphne Joseph-Hackett =

- 1972
- Born: 1915; Barbados
- Died: 1988 (aged 72–73); Barbados
- Other names: Daphne Hackett
- Occupations: educator, actor, theatre producer

Daphne Joseph-Hackett (also known as Miss Hackett 1915–1988) was a Bajan teacher, actor and theatre producer. Her contributions to the development of the arts in Barbados were recognized with the Order of Barbados's Silver Service Star. The annual award given at the National Independence Festival of Creative Arts and the Queen's Park Theatre, were renamed in her honor.

== Biography ==
Daphne Joseph-Hackett was born in 1915 in Barbados. Training as a teacher, she began her career teaching in Grenada. After eleven years, she returned to Barbados. She taught Latin at Queen's College in Bridgetown. In the 1940s, the British Council established regional offices to sponsor theatre workshops. Hackett worked with these groups, as well as later with the extramural department of the University College of the West Indies, once it was established, as a producer and organizer of these workshops. She was instrumental in bringing Bajan Creole to the stage, as at the time, local dialect was forbidden in public productions. When one of her students forgot the lines in a rehearsal and improvised using the local dialect, Hackett approached the headmistress and was granted approval to use Creole.

In the early 1960, Hackett joined with Andrea Gollop-Greenidge, Elombe Mottley, Angela Owen, Mike Owen, Icil Phillips and Monica Procope to form the Barbados National Theatre Workshop. In 1966, she co-founded, with Jamaican Noel Vaz, the theatrical productions of the Barbados Festival Choir. Writing pantomimes and staging the productions for the Festival Choir, she acted as the business manager of the organisation, taking them on tours to other Caribbean countries, such as Dominica and Guyana. As an actress, she performed in The Brathwaites of Black Rock, a local serial, carried on Radio Barbados. Hackett was awarded the Silver Service Star of the Order of Barbados in 1985, after having served over thirty years in developing theatre in the country.

== Death and legacy ==
Joseph-Hackett died in 1988 in Barbados. In 1991, the Queen's Park Theatre was renamed in her honor. The theatre closed in 2005, but was renovated and reopened in 2017. Annually, during the National Independence Festival of Creative Arts, the top honor in dramatic performance is given the Daphne Joseph-Hackett Award For Excellence in Drama.
