= Saint Philip's Parish Church, Barbados =

Coordinates: 13.13693°N 59.48870°W

Saint Philip's Parish Church
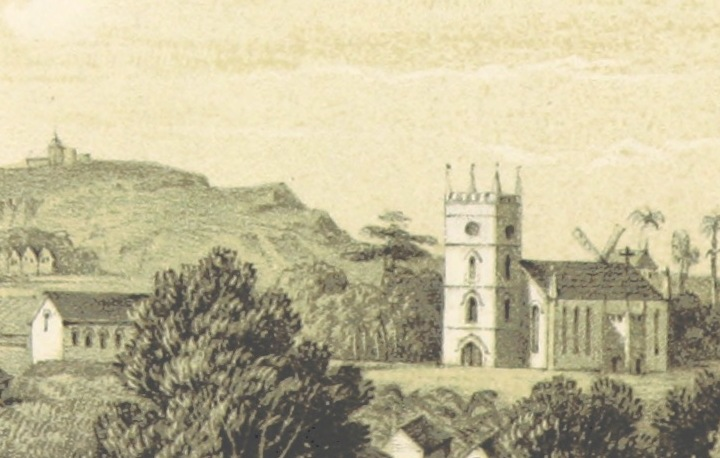
- Saint Philip's Parish Church in an 1848 lithograph by W. L. Walton
- Saint Philip's Parish Church
- Location: Church Village, Saint Philip, Barbados
- Denomination: Anglican
- Website: stphilipsparishchurch.com

Architecture
- Years built: 1640 (original); 1786 (rebuilt); 20 October 1837 (rebuilt and consecrated)
- Closed: 1780 (destroyed by hurricane); 11 August 1831 (destroyed by hurricane)

Saint Philip's Parish Church was built in 1640 as the Anglican church for Saint Philip Parish, Barbados. However the original structure was destroyed in a hurricane in 1780 and was rebuilt in 1786. However, this structure was also destroyed in a hurricane on August 11, 1831. The church was then rebuilt again, the new structure being consecrated on 20 October 1837 by Bishop William Hart Coleridge. On Ash Wednesday in 1977 (23 February) the building was partially damaged in a fire, but has since been restored.

== Graveyard ==
The graveyard was consecrated at the same time as the restored church in October 1837. It contains the graves of various notable former residents:

- Cyril G. Sisnett (1875-1934)
