= Elsie Payne =

Barbadian educator

Dame Elsie Payne DA
- Born: Elsie Pilgrim; 14 May 1927; Bridgetown, Saint Michael Parish, Barbados
- Died: 25 August 2004 (aged 77); Bridgetown, Barbados
- Occupation: Educator
- Years active: 1952–1985
- Known for: First Barbadian headmistress of Queen's College Barbados and first damehood awarded by the Order of Barbados

Dame Elsie Payne (née Pilgrim; 14 May 1927 – 25 August 2004) was a teacher and following independence she became the first Barbadian-born principal of Queen's College in Bridgetown. She was the first Barbadian woman to receive a damehood, for her long dedication to education and nation (notably, the first Barbadian man to be knighted was Sir Conrad Reeves, who was made a Knight Bachelor by Queen Victoria in 1889).

== Early life ==
Elsie Pilgrim was born on 14 May 1927 in Bridgetown, Saint Michael Parish, Barbados to S.O. Pilgrim, a shoe merchant in Bridgetown. Her ancestry included Charles Pilgrim, who was at one time the headmaster of Combermere School. Pilgrim entered Queen's College at the age of nine and continued to her graduation. In 1946, Pilgrim won the Barbados Government Scholarship, the first time the scholarship had been awarded to a woman. She continued her university studies at Exeter College, then a part of the University of London, earning a Bachelor of Arts in history in 1949. Furthering her education, Pilgrim then enrolled at the University of Cambridge, attaining a PhD in history.

== Career ==
Pilgrim returned to Barbados and began her teaching career at Queen's College in 1952 and the following year married Dr. David O. Payne. At a time when the history of the British West Indies was not typically a part of the curriculum, Payne taught about slavery in the Caribbean. In 1966, Payne was appointed as deputy headmistress of Queen's College.

When Barbadian teachers went on strike in 1969, over salary and working conditions, against the Ministry of Education, Payne became spokesperson for the teachers and the Barbados Secondary Teachers' Union.

The nature of the conflict was that teachers who had been appointed to the staff of the newly opened Barbados Community College were offered different salaries and conditions than teachers who were equally qualified and were employed in secondary schools. The dispute became heated, with threats of firing, loss of pension and other benefits from Prime Minister Errol Barrow. Payne and the teachers stood resolute and gained the concessions for which they fought, resulting in an overhaul and reform of Barbados' educational system.

In 1970, Payne became the first Barbadian-born principal of the school and the following year was one of the founders of the Parent-Teacher Association. In addition to her work at Queen's College, Payne served on several national education boards, the Barbados Constitution Review Commission, the Barbados Privy Council, as well as providing lectures at the Centre for Multi-Racial Studies under the auspices of the University of the West Indies and the University of Sussex. Serving on the Council of the University of the West Indies from 1973, she served as the Council Chair in 1987. For her many contributions to education and the nation, Payne was knighted by the Barbadian government in 1980, becoming the first woman to be honoured as a Dame of St Andrew (DA) of the Order of Barbados. She continued leading Queen's College until her retirement in 1985.

== Death and legacy ==
Payne died on 25 August 2004 in Bridgetown, Barbados. The buildings of Queen's College were renamed to honour the four Barbadian-born headmistresses in 2007, including one named after Payne. In addition, the headquarters of the Ministry of Education are named in her honour, as is a roundabout near the Bridgetown Port. In 2016, Payne was honoured as one of Barbados' best public officers and included in a special publication Challenge to Change issued by the Office of Public Sector Reform.
