= Esther Byer-Suckoo =

Barbadian physician and politician

- Born: September 10, 1968 (age 57); Saint George, Barbados
- Occupation: Physician
- Known for: Barbados Minister of Labor

Esther R. Byer-Suckoo (born 1968) is a Barbadian physician and politician. She is the former Barbados Minister of Labor and a member of the Democratic Labour Party.

== Early life and education ==
Esther Byer-Suckoo was born on September 10, 1968, in Saint George. She attended St. Luke's Primary School and Queen's College. She proceeded to attend University of the West Indies in Mona, Jamaica. She earned her PhD as a physician in 1993. After graduation, she worked at Queen Elizabeth Hospital, Bridgetown in the Barbados.

== Career ==
Byer-Suckoo founded the Ellerton Medical Centre in 1997. In 2001 and 2005, she served as a medical missionary in Malawi and Uganda, respectively.

In January 2008, she was elected to the Parliament of Barbados, representing South Saint George. In 2010, she was named Barbados Minister of Labor. In 2018, she ran for Parliament again.
