= Michele Jawando =

American lawyer

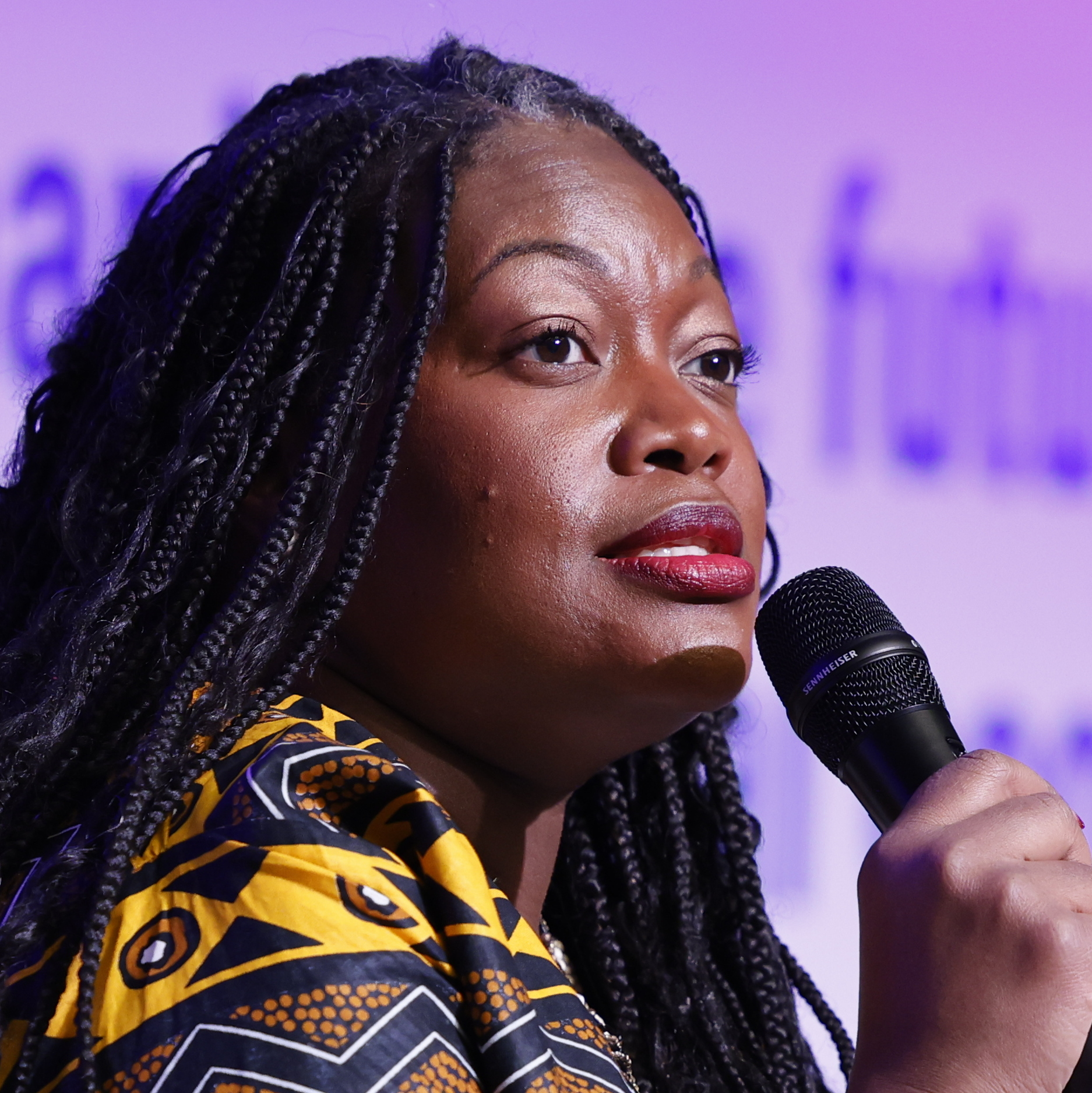
- Born: Michele Lawrence; New York, U.S.
- Education: Hampton University (BA); University of North Carolina, Chapel Hill (JD)
- Spouse: Will Jawando
- Children: 4
- Relatives: Lois Browne-Evans (great-aunt)

Michele Lawrence Jawando is an American nonprofit executive who is the CEO of the Omidyar Network. She has previously worked as a podcaster, a co-host on SiriusXM, on Google's Public Policy, and at the Center for American Progress.

== Life ==
She was born in New York and her mother was a minister in the African Methodist Episcopal Church. Her great-aunt was Lois Browne-Evans, Bermuda's first woman black lawyer (who was knighted). Jawando spent a lot of time in Bermuda as she and her family would move there sometimes. She graduated from Hampton University in Virginia and she gained her doctorate from the University of North Carolina at Chapel Hill School of Law.

Jawando worked for the US Senator Kirsten Gillibrand. She then worked for the liberal Center for American Progress (CAP) when she co-hosted their podcast Thinking CAP before she joined Google. She was employed on Google's Public Policy team to look after relationships with thought-leaders, non-profit companies, politicians and think-tanks.

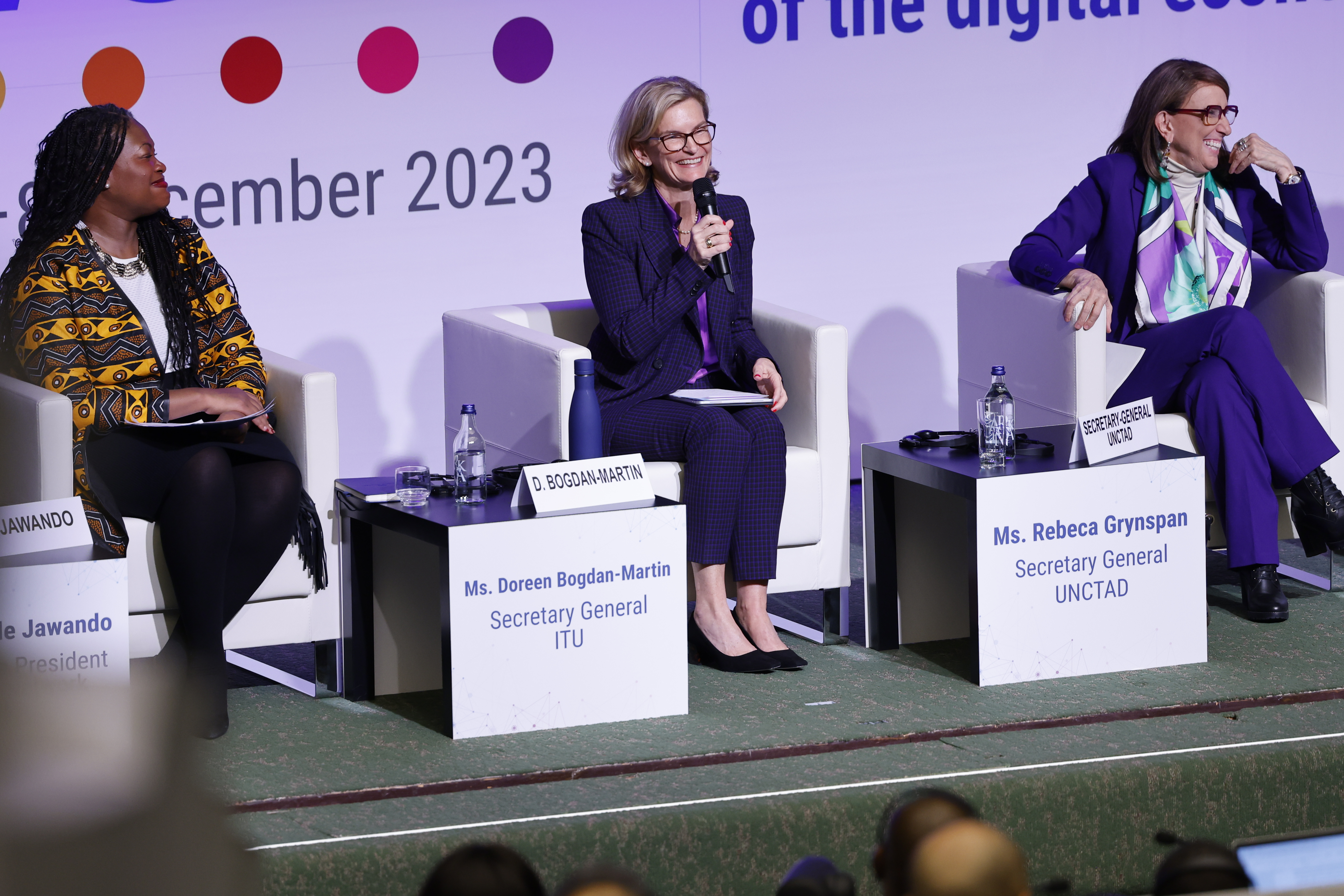
Jawando, Doreen Bogdan-Martin and Rebeca Grynspan at UNCTAD eWeek in December 2023

== Media ==
She has been a co-host of SiriusXM, as well as a podcaster.

In 2015, President Barack Obama went to visit an American jail to further his work in countering racial discrimination in the US justice system. The British newspaper The Guardian turned to Jawando for comment. Some saw Obama as a lame-duck President but Jawando saw that this was his opportunity to address US systemic bias. She pointed out that he had a special outlook because he was the first African-American President.

Jawando has been brought in as an expert to give her insight into American politics where she volunteered that the (then) President Donald Trump was not telling the truth.

In 2020, she was one of ten people to receive the Caribbean American Heritage Award because of her Caribbean heritage and for her outstanding contributions to corporate America.

As of January 2023, Jawando was senior vice president for programs of the Omidyar Network.

== Personal life ==
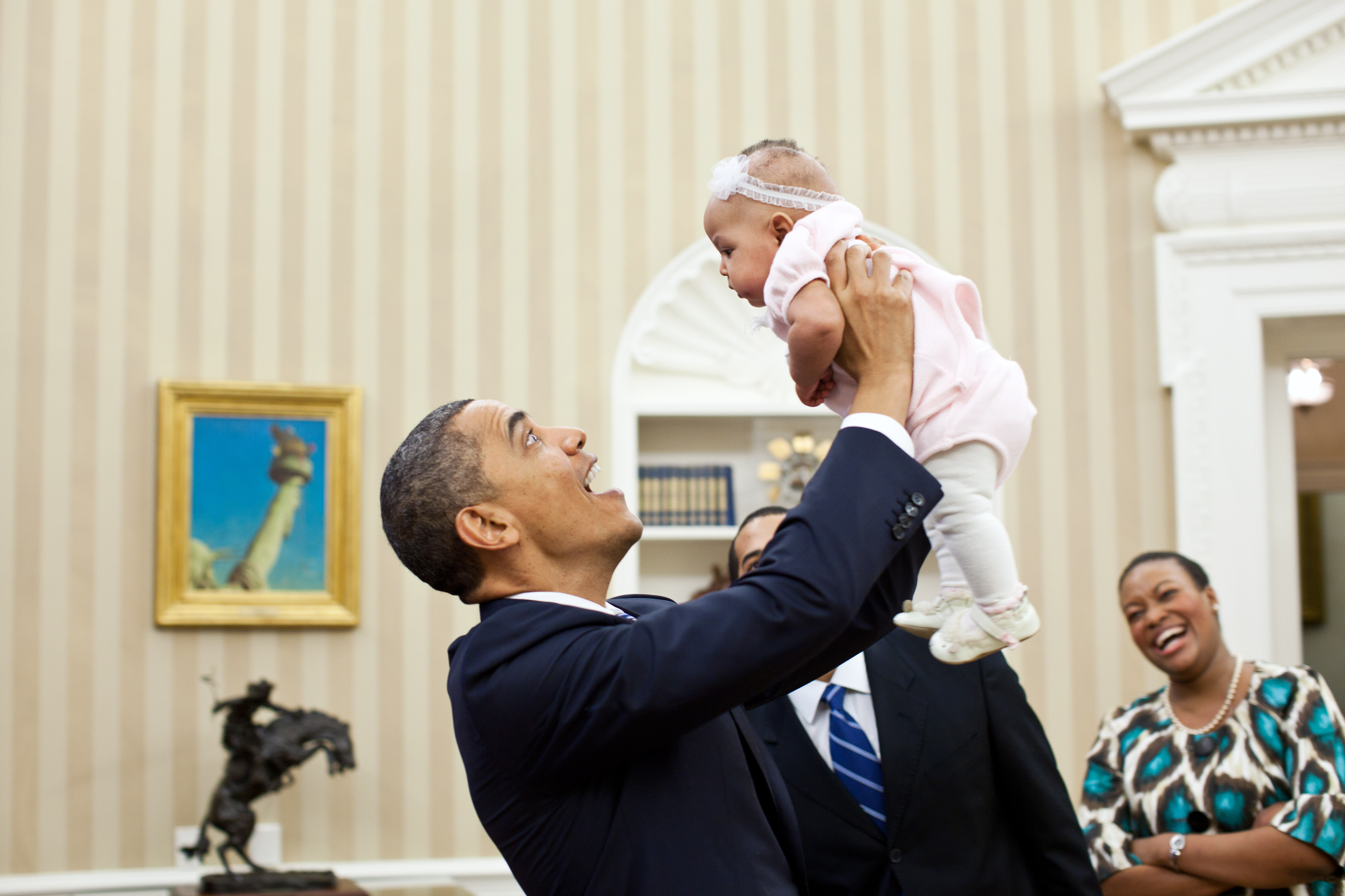
President Barack Obama holds up Jawando's four-month-old child in 2011

Jawando first met her husband, Will Jawando, in 2004 at the Chi-Cha Lounge in Washington, D.C. They were engaged nine months later. Together, they have four children and live in Sandy Spring, Maryland.
