= Husbands, Barbados =

Populated place in Barbados

Husbands
- Village
- Location in Barbados
- Coordinates: 13°18′04″N 59°38′47″W
- Country: Barbados
- Parish: Saint Lucy

Husbands is a populated place in Saint Lucy Parish, Barbados.

== See also ==
- List of cities, towns and villages in Barbados
