= Nick Whittle =

British visual artist and writer

Nick Whittle is a visual artist and writer who has lived and worked in Barbados since 1979. He was born in Birmingham, England, and attended the Moseley School of Art in Birmingham, Manchester Polytechnic, and the University of Newcastle upon Tyne. He taught at Queen's College, Barbados from 1981 until 2002, and was Head of Fine Arts from 1990 to 2002.

His work has represented Barbados at regional exhibitions, including the 1998 Cuenca Biennial, as well as those in 1996 and 2001 in the Dominican Republic.

He was awarded third prize for his poetry collection 'Ithaka' in the 2003 Frank Collymore Literary Competition, sponsored by the Central Bank of Barbados.

His series 'Innerscape' was part of a 2006 traveling exhibition, Barbadiana, which toured Paris, Vienna, and Brussels. Part of this important series of works represented Barbados at Carifesta IX in Trinidad and Tobago.

== Publications ==
- Alissandra Cummins, Allison Thompson & Nick Whittle, Art in Barbados, Ian Randle Publishers (1999), ISBN 976-8123-82-6
