= Ministry of Labour (Barbados) =

Government ministry of Barbados

Ministry of Labour, Social Security and Third Sector (Barbados)
- Ministry of Labour

Ministry overview
- Annual budget: $80.5 million BBD (2016-2017)
- Minister responsible: The Honourable Colin E. Jordan
- Ministry executive: Marva Howell, Permanent Secretary
- Child agencies: Barbados Employment and Career Counselling Service; Labour Department; National Insurance Department
- Website: labour.gov.bb

The Ministry of Labour, Social Security and Third Sector, commonly referred to as the Ministry of Labour, is a government ministry responsible for policy formulation, industrial relations, acting as a secretariat to the Social Partnership, and the other overall administration and coordination of all operations falling under the Minister of Labour’s portfolio.

The current Permanent Secretary in the Ministry of Labour, Social Security and Third Sector is Marva Howell.

The Honourable Colin E. Jordan was appointed Minister of Labour and Social Partnership Relations on May 27, 2018 and subsequently reappointed as Minister responsible for labour in the new Ministry of Labour, Social Security and Third Sector.

== Organization and Management ==
=== The Permanent Secretary ===
Ms. Marva Howell currently serves the people of Barbados as Permanent Secretary. Mrs. Yolande Howard previously served from August 2016 to January 2019 before reassignment and then Mr. Alyson Forte until December 2019. Karen Best, EdD then served from 2020 to 2023 followed by Mr. Timothy Maynard from December 2023 until June 30, 2024.

A Permanent Secretary is essentially the chief executive officer of a ministry, reporting to the Cabinet of Barbados. The Permanent Secretary or P.S is the most senior civil servant in government and is not politically appointed. The P.S is responsible for managing the ministry tasked with implementing the Cabinet's policies as it relates to what falls under the Minister's portfolio. In the case of Barbados, the P.S as well as other civil servants are appointed through a government agency known as Personnel Administration Division. Thus, Permanent Secretaries cannot be hired or terminated by their Ministers or the Prime Minister of Barbados. The Permanent Secretary is the accounting officer of the Ministry.

Assisting the Permanent Secretary is a Deputy Permanent Secretary and Secretary.

=== Planning and Administration ===
==== General Management ====
The Ministry of Labour and Social Partnership Relations is managed by a Permanent Secretary, Deputy Permanent Secretary and other senior staff that ensure the formulation and implementation of policies under the Minister's portfolio. The Ministry is the main facilitator of relations between the Government of Barbados and international organizations such as the International Labour Organization. The ministry is also responsible for facilitating relationship with workers unions in Barbados and working with foreign governments to aid in the a

==== Manpower Research and Statistical Unit ====
The Manpower Research and Statistical Unit is the intelligence gathering and research unit of the Ministry of Labour . The Unit is responsible for ensuring labour market information is provided to the people of Barbados in a timely manner. This Unit is managed by a Chief Research Officer. This Unit relays information to the public through the Barbados Labour Market Information System. This system has many functions, one of which is outreach in the form of lectures and presentations.

=== Labour Department ===
The Labour Department is responsible for the technical areas of the Ministry of Labour. The Department is run by a Chief Labour Officer who is responsible for ensuring the mandate of the Department is carried out. The Department's functions are carried out by three sub-divisions. These sub-divisions are Industrial Relations, Occupational Safety and Health and the National Employment Bureau.

On May 24, 2017, it was announced by Permanent Secretary Yolande Howard that the National Employment Bureau would be re-branding and the first step of this would be to re-name the Bureau the Barbados Employment and Career Counselling Service (BECCS) department. This re-branding of the Bureau is expected to increase effectiveness and efficiency. “All in all the restructuring and institutional strengthening of the National Employment Bureau will ensure that the new public employment service, BECCS, is better able to fulfill its mandate”, said the Permanent Secretary.

== Budget ==
The figures below are reflective of the 2016 - 2017 Budget Estimates.

| Division | Funding (in millions) |
|---|---|
| Direction and Policy Formulation | $4.2 |
| Operation of the National Insurance Scheme and Social Security | $48.8 |
| HIV and Aids Prevention and Control Project | $0.3 |
| Employment and Labour Relations | $5.2 |
| Occupational Training | $16.9 |
| Human Resource Development Strategy | $5 |
| Total | $80.5 |

== See also ==
- Esther Byer-Suckoo
