= Yvette Goddard =

Ambassador of Barbados to Brazil

- Occupations: Public servant, Permanent Secretary
- Employer: Government of Barbados
- Known for: Ambassador of Barbados to the Federative Republic of Brazil (2010-2017)

Yvette Goddard was Barbados’ Ambassador to Brazil from 2010 to 2017.

== Career ==
Goddard is a career public servant and diplomat for Barbados. She has previously served in Barbados' diplomatic offices in Venezuela and the United States of America. While in the United States, she was posted to Barbados' Embassy in Washington, D.C., and its Consulate-General at Miami.

She was serving as Charge d'affaires in Brussels when she was appointed an Ambassador. Barbados recognised the growing importance of Brazil and, in this regard, made a decision to establish an Embassy in 2010. Goddard was chosen as her country's first Ambassador Extraordinary and Plenipotentiary to Brazil. In the same year GOL Linha Aerea Inteligentes (GOL Intelligent Airlines) started direct flights from Barbados to Sao Paulo in Brazil which cut a 20 hour journey via Miami down to six hours. Goddard was at the celebration.

On 12 September 2012, Goddard was given a medal in Brazil for her services in improving relations. The award was made by Antonio Anastasia and Maristela Kubitschek. Maristela is the daughter of former President Juscelino Kubitschek. The medal is named the Juscelino Kubitschek Medal.

Goddard left her post in Brazil in 2017. She was subsequently appointed Permanent Secretary in the Office of Attorney General.
