= Henry Lowe (scientist) =

Jamaican scientist, philanthropist and businessperson

Dr. Henry Isaac Clore Lowe OJ OD is a Jamaican scientist, philanthropist and businessperson. His career began in academia where he worked at College of Art, Science, and Technology (CAST) for 16 years, before entering public life by joining the Ministry of Energy. He now owns and manages a variety of businesses in the health industry.

== Early life and education ==
Henry Lowe was born on April 9, 1939, in St. Andrew, Jamaica. His family was "far from being wealthy" and were devout Catholics. His father David was a Cabinet Member and his mother Josephine was a part-time tailor and a homemaker. Lowe was the fourth of ten children. At four years old Lowe was enrolled at the Woods' infant school. Though it was located on Metcalfe Road, a neighborhood which was considered affluent at the time, his school hosted its classes in sheds behind a house. Lowe attended primary school in Port Maria and later attended Excelsior High School.

Lowe was accepted into the University of the West Indies in 1959 with scholarship, where he graduated with a bachelor of Science and Honours degrees in natural science. Lowe obtained a Master's in Pharmaceutical and Medicinal chemistry from the University of Sydney and his Ph.D. at Manchester University. To both universities Lowe was awarded a British commonwealth scholarship becoming "the first Jamaican, and maybe the only one ever, to be awarded two commonwealth Scholarships". He pursued post-doctoral studies at the Bolton Institute of Technology, the Massachusetts Institute of Technology and Harvard University.

== Career ==
=== Academia ===
The year after graduating from Excelsior high school Lowe was himself hired as a science teacher at Holmwood high school. After graduating from the University of the West Indies, he taught chemistry at Excelsior high school and was appointed the head of the Science Department for one year, after which he began lecturing at CAST on September 10, 1964. His time at this institution was interrupted intermittently by educational pursuits. Lowe returned to the College of Art Science and technology in 1970 and was made the head of the science department in 1973 – the first native Jamaican to have held this position. Lowe returned again where he was made vice principal of academic affairs. Being persuaded by Jamaica's then Ambassador to the U.S., Douglas Fletcher, Lowe left his position at CAST to join the Ministry of Energy to help manage the severe energy crisis Jamaica was experiencing.

=== Research ===
Lowe's research is focused on ascertaining medicinal and pharmacological qualities of Jamaican plants; in particular Cannabis and Tillandsia recurvata. Lowe has been involved in Cannabis research "since 1972". His Ph.D. focused on examining "the structure activity relationships of some of the cannabinoids in ganja". Lowe, in collaboration with various colleagues has produced experimental findings which demonstrate the efficacy of cannabis flavonoids in combating illnesses such as hepatitis c. Lowe's interest in Tillandsia recurvata began during his doctoral studies. Lowe and his research team have since shown that it can be potent medicine for prostate cancer through its cytotoxic properties towards cancer cell lines (P-3C and P-45). Lowe produces a variety of health products based on his discoveries in these areas.

=== Public Service ===
Lowe developed the first National Energy Policy and Management plan for Jamaica as the director of its Ministry of Energy. It included an agreement with Venezuela that 25% of the revenue generated from Jamaica's purchase of Venezuelan oil would be re-directed towards various Jamaican development projects. Lowe also achieved the reduction of Jamaica's use of oil by 20 percent. After this, Lowe helped establish the Ministry of Science, Technology and the Environment, before joining the Ministry of Agriculture, and then the Ministry of Public Utilities and Transport.

=== Business ventures ===
==== Blue Cross Jamaica ====
Lowe was a consultant for Blue Cross of Jamaica since the 1970s, and was appointed to the board of trustees in 1988. Following the resignation of then CEO Hylton McIntosh, Lowe was appointed as CEO in 1990. Lowe would later acquire the majority of the Blue Cross of Jamaica from its previous holder, the Blue Cross Blue Shield Association. Lowe sold his shares in 2008 to Sagicor.

==== Eden Gardens ====
In 2000 Lowe purchased a two-acre property on 39 Lady Musgrave road. Lowe used this land to create the "Eden gardens wellness center and spa" – a business venture which also aligns with his ideals of promoting wellness and health in Jamaica. More property was purchased across from 44 lady Musgrave road which was being used for an expansion as of 2012. Novlet green took over management of the facility in 2006.

==== Pharmaceutical firms ====
In 2007 at a conference of the Caribbean poison information network (CARPIN), Lowe spoke of the commercial benefits possible from research into medicinal cannabis. In 2013 Lowe established Medicanja; a company to produce and commercialize products based on cannabis. He is the firm's Executive Chairman and chief scientist. Medicanja has a research facility at the University of the West Indies. On July 26, 2018, Medicanja released twelve nutraceutical products. Six of these products; CanjaRub, CanjaCol, Relevium Cream, Relevium Spray, Somnican (One Drop) Orals, and Tivasat, are designed to inhibit pain. Six others are intended for specific usage: CBD Oil Sublingual Drops designed to reduce nausea, I-Cann designed for those with glaucoma and intra-ocular pressure, Epilec Pro for epilepsy, Sclorican for pain and discomfort caused by multiple sclerosis, Cannrepel a mosquito repellent; and the "Oromuccosol Spray". All of these products have been approved by the FDA. On December 3, 2018, the Development Bank of Jamaica agreed to provide Medicanja with $7 million to facilitate the clinical trials of its experimental drug, "Drug X Version 2". The firm developed drug, Chrysoeriol, which could be used to treat acute myeloid leukaemia. On July 12, 2017, Lowe announced Chrysoeriol had been given orphan drug status by the FDA Lowe, working with various academics, has filed for sixteen patents in the United States, six of which have been granted.

== Philanthropy ==
In 1992 Lowe founded the "Environmental Health Foundation", a non-governmental charitable organization which identifies, implements and gives grants to pro-social projects. in "health, education, environment, science & technology and the development of knowledge". In 2015, the EHF won an Energy Globe award for its three-year program (2011-2014) designed to increase the resilience of Jamaican farmers to climate change, in partnership with the United States Agency for International Development from which it received funding. As of 2018, Lowe was the charity's executive chairman.

== Honors and awards ==
- Award for service in the field of Student Welfare at (CAST, 1973/1974)
- The Centenary Medal in the field of Science (Institute of Jamaica, 1879–1979)
- Appointment to the Order of Distinction (October 16, 1982)
- Award for the promotion of Science & Technology (Jamaican Society of Scientists & Technology, 1983)
- Special Recognition Award (CAST, 1992)
- Super Lion Award (University of the West Indies,1995)
- Observer Business Leader of the Year Award (Jamaican Observer, 2006)
- Pelican Award (University of the West Indies Alumni association, 2008)
- Marcus Garvey Award for contributions in the field of industry (UNIA, 2011)
- The Sir Philip Sherlock Distinguished Award (The University Diabetes Outreach program UDOP, 2012)
- Honorary Life Member Award (Caribbean Association of Pharmacists, 2012)
- Appointment to the Order of Jamaica (effective August 6, 2012)
- Honoured by the United States Government for his contributions to the sciences, science education and exemplary public service. Presented with a proclamation from the United States House of Representatives ( 2013)
- Honorary Doctorate of Science & Innovation, Honoris Causa (University of the Commonwealth Caribbean, 2014)
- Local Innovator Award (Inter-American development bank, 2016)
- Marcus Garvey Lifetime Achievement Award (Institute of Caribbean Studies, November 17, 2017).
