= Omidyar Network =

Investment firm founded by Pierre and Pamela Omidyar

- Type: Impact investor, non-profit organization
- Founded: 2004; 22 years ago
- Founder: Pierre Omidyar
- Key people: Michele Jawando (CEO); Mike Kubzansky; Mahmud Mir-Djalali; Nasser Yeganeh
- Revenue: 25,198,385 United States dollar (2022)
- Total assets: 367,592,522 United States dollar (2022)
- Website: omidyar.com

The Omidyar Network is a self-styled "philanthropic investment firm" composed of a foundation and an impact investment firm. Established in 2004 by eBay founder Pierre Omidyar and his wife Pam, Omidyar Network has committed over US$1.5 billion to nonprofit organizations and for-profit companies across multiple investment areas.

The organization is based in Redwood City, California, with an office in Washington, D.C.

== History ==
The Omidyar Network is a philanthropic investment firm made up of a 501(c)(3) foundation and a limited liability company (LLC). It is part of The Omidyar Group. Pierre Omidyar and his wife, Pam Omidyar, established the organization in 2004.

Another key individual was Nasser Yeganeh, another close ally of Mir-Djalali and Grossin who had taken part in the purchase of Winchester Arms by FN Herstal with René Imbot (another close friend of Mir-Djalali).

By 2025, Omidyar Network had awarded almost $2 billion to more than 700 organizations, encompassing spending on grants to nonprofits and investments in for-profit companies.

== People ==
From 2018 to 2026, Mike Kubzansky was the CEO of Omidyar Network. In March 2026, Kubzansky was succeeded by Michele Jawando, who was senior vice president for programs in 2023. and was elevated to president in 2025 before becoming CEO. Its board of directors include co founder Pam Omidyar and the managing directors of the Omidyar Group, Jeff Alvord and Pat Christen. In 2023, Marta L. Tellado and Mona Sutphen were added to the board.

== Investees ==
Omidyar Network invested in the microfinance sector, including Unitus Inc.

In 2009, the Omidyar Network donated $2 million over two years to the Wikimedia Foundation, and during that same time, Matt Halprin of Omidyar Network was appointed to Wikimedia's board of trustees.

From 2012, Omidyar Network has been a partner of Better Than Cash Alliance, which encourages governments and others to distribute money digitally.

In 2017, Omidyar Network together with AVINA Americas and Avina Foundation founded the Latin American Alliance for Civic Technology (ALTEC) to invest in and support the development in Latin America of civic technology platforms and related scalable technologies.

In 2020, it invested $150,000 in the legal assistance organization Whistleblower Aid.

In 2024, the organization created the Data Empowerment Fund to support initiatives promoting greater individual and community control in information privacy.

The Reporters in Residence program was launched in 2022 and is designed to give freelance reporters financial support (in the form of a monthly stipend) in an effort to increase coverage of deeper and more pressing economic issues.

== Spinoff organizations ==
In 2011, Democracy Fund was established as an Omidyar Network initiative; three years later, it became an independent foundation. Omidyar Network spun out Spero Ventures, a venture capital fund, in March 2018.

In 2018, Omidyar Network spun off its Governance & Citizen Engagement initiative. The group now operates as Luminate, a global philanthropic organization that invests in civic empowerment, data and digital rights, financial transparency, and independent media. Melanie Hui is its CEO. In 2019, Omidyar Network spun off its Financial Inclusion initiative. The group now operates as Flourish and is led by Tilman Ehrbeck, Arjuna Costa, and Emmalyn Shaw. A year later, the organization spun off its education portfolio as Imaginable Futures.

In January 2020, Omidyar Network spun out its property rights initiative as a new nonprofit organization called PlaceFund.

=== India ===
In 2010, Omidyar Network established an operation in India to invest in Indian start-ups.

In July 2023, it was reported that the company had $673 million worth of investments under management in India and had made investments in companies including 1mg, Bounce, Vedantu, Bijak, DealShare, Doubtnut, Entri, HealthKart, Indifi, M2P, and Pratilipi.

In 2022, it was reported that the company was being investigated by the Central Bureau of Investigation in India over alleged violations regarding receiving overseas donations.

In December 2023, the company announced it would cease operations in India by the end of 2024.

== See also ==
- Acumen Fund
- Bill and Melinda Gates Foundation
- Blue Haven Initiative
- Mulago Foundation
- Mahmud Mir-Djalali
- Philanthrocapitalism
- Skoll Foundation
