= Museum Management and Curatorship =

- Discipline: Museology
- Language: English
- Edited by: Robert R. Janes

Publication details
- Former names: The International Journal of Museum Management and Curatorship
- History: 1982–present
- Publisher: Routledge (UK)
- Frequency: Quarterly

Standard abbreviations
- ISO 4: Mus. Manag. Curatorsh.

Indexing
- ISSN: 0964-7775 (print); 1872-9185 (web)

Links
- Journal homepage

Museum Management and Curatorship (MMC) is an international peer-reviewed, journal aimed at museum professionals, consultants, educators, and researchers. Its content is intended to examine current issues in museum practice. The journal covers aspects such as administration, archives, collections management, communications, conservation, diversity, globalization, governance, interpretation, leadership, management, new technology, professional ethics, public service, purpose/mission, and social responsibility.

The journal was originally published by Butterworth Scientific. Routledge acquired the journal and began publishing it in 2007.
