= Massy Holdings =

Trinidad and Tobago based conglomerate

Massy Holdings Limited is a Trinidad and Tobago conglomerate operating in the Caribbean. It is publicly traded on the Trinidad and Tobago Stock Exchange and the Jamaica Stock Exchange as (MASSY) with a share value of (TT$8.57 billion) as of March 2024.
