= Shawna Kimbrell =

American fighter pilot

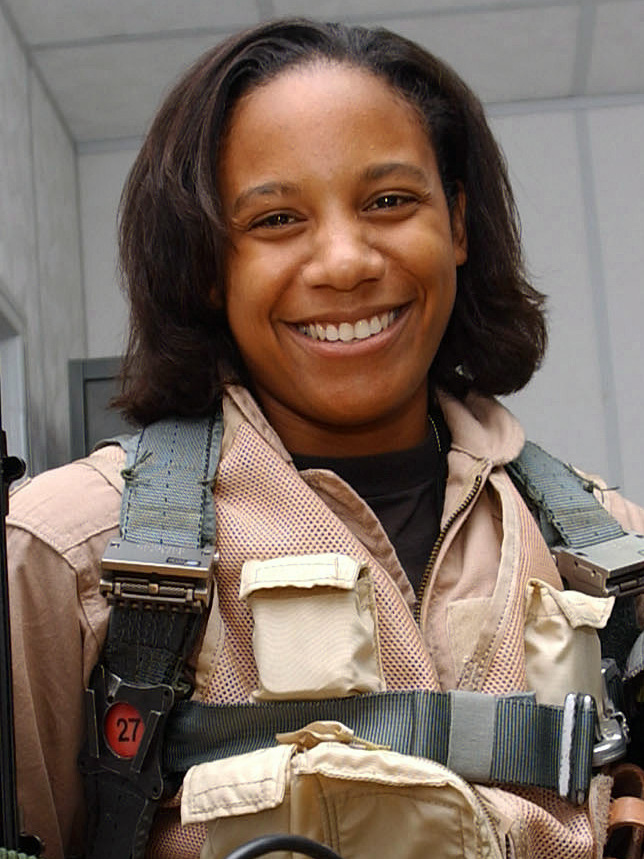
- Kimbrell flying Iraq no-fly zone Operation Northern Watch 2001
- Born: Shawna Rochelle Ng A Qui; April 20, 1976 (age 50); Lafayette, Indiana, U.S.
- Military career
- Allegiance: United States of America
- Branch: United States Air Force
- Rank: Lt. Colonel
- Units: 78th Attack Squadron, 926th Fighter Wing
- Conflicts: Operation Southern Watch; Operation Northern Watch; Operation Iraqi Freedom
- Awards: Air Medal; Meritorious Service Medal; Aerial Achievement Medal; Air Force Commendation Medal; Army Commendation Medal; National Defense Service Medal; Armed Forces Expeditionary Medal; Iraq Campaign Medal; Global War on Terrorism Service Medal; Korean Defense Service Medal

Shawna Rochelle Kimbrell (born April 20, 1976; née Ng A Qui) is a retired lieutenant colonel in the United States Air Force, and the first female African-American fighter pilot in the history of that service. She flew the F-16 Fighting Falcon during combat missions in Operation Northern Watch.

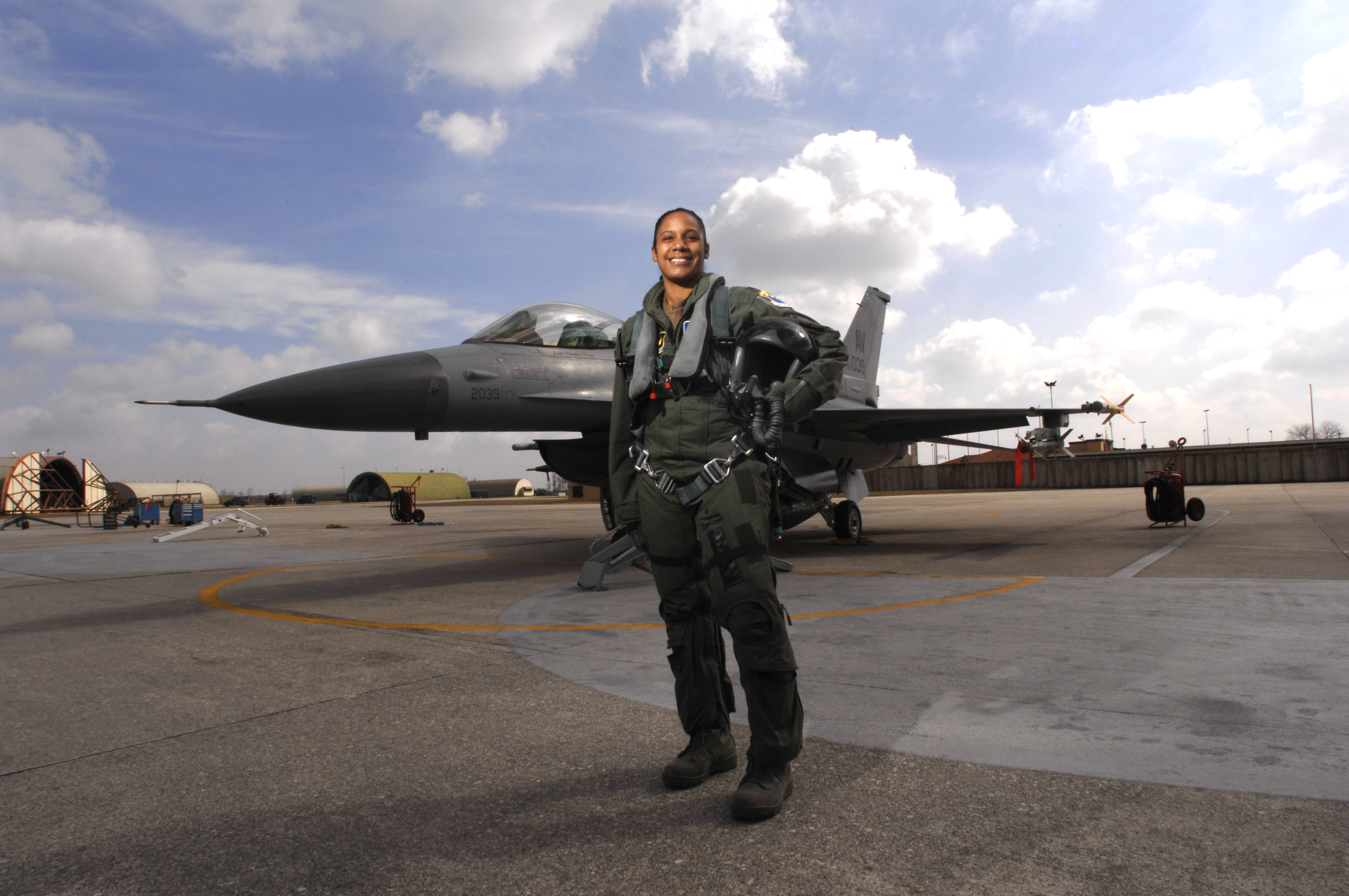
Kimbrell in 2008, posing with a F-16.

== Early life and education ==
Kimbrell was born in Lafayette, Indiana. The youngest of four children, her mother and father, Eve (née Blackman) Ng A Qui and Dr. Norman Ng A Qui, emigrated to the United States and became naturalized U.S. citizens by the time she was born. The family moved to Parker, Colorado, and it was there, while attending fourth grade, that Kimbrell decided to pursue a career as a fighter pilot.

She had her first flight lesson at age fourteen, before joining the Civil Air Patrol, and working at air shows, subsequently earning her private pilot's license. Following graduation from high school, Kimbrell attended the United States Air Force Academy, graduating in 1998 with a Bachelor of Science Degree in General Engineering. After graduation, she subsequently attended Undergraduate Pilot Training (UPT), and was designated a pilot in August 1999. Kimbrell also holds a Master of Business Administration from Touro University.

== Career ==
Kimbrell received her commission in 1998 after graduating from the USAF Academy, later she attended Undergraduate Pilot Training at Laughlin AFB (Val Verde County, Texas) and was awarded her pilot wings in August 1999. She then completed Introduction to Fighter Fundamentals training at Randolph AFB (Bexar County, Texas) in November 1999. In August 2000, she graduated from her initial F-16 training at Luke AFB (Maricopa County, Arizona) becoming the first African American female fighter pilot in the USAF.

She was assigned to the 13th Fighter Squadron, Misawa, Japan for her first operational assignment. During this time she was deployed to Turkey and Saudi Arabia in support of Operation Northern and Southern Watch. Her flights in Operation Northern Watch marked her as the first female pilot to fly combat missions for Misawa's 35th Fighter Wing. Additionally, during Operation Northern Watch she became the first African American female pilot to employ ordnance in combat.

In July 2004, she graduated from the Joint Fire Control Course and was assigned to the 15th Air Support Operations Squadron. Later she deployed as the 2nd Brigade Air Liaison Officer in support of Operation Iraqi Freedom. In June 2007, she was assigned to the 31st Fighter Wing, Aviano AB Italy where she served as Assistant Director of Operations for the 555 Fighter Squadron.

In 2009, Kimbrell relocated to 6th Combat Training Squadron, Nellis AFB where she served as the Course Manager for the Air Liaison Officer Qualification Course and an instructor. From this assignment, she separated from active duty Air Force and transitioned to the Air Force Reserves in October 2013.

After retiring from the Air Force in 2020, Kimbrell became "self-employed as a public speaker, civilian flight instructor, and independent contractor instructor at the Air Force Academy’s Aero Club."

== Personal life ==
Kimbrell is married to Travis Kimbrell and the couple have two sons, Kade and Jakeb.

== Awards and decorations ==
- Air Medal with one device
- Meritorious Service Medal
- Aerial Achievement Medal
- Air Force Commendation Medal with one device
- Army Commendation Medal
- National Defense Service Medal
- Armed Forces Expeditionary Medal
- Iraq Campaign Medal
- Global War on Terrorism Service Medal
- Korean Defense Service Medal
