= Trisha Bailey =

Jamaican athlete and philanthropist

- Born: Saint Elizabeth Parish, Jamaica.
- Education: University of Connecticut; University of Phoenix
- Occupations: Education activist Philanthropist
- Years active: 1990–present
- Known for: Student athlete for UConn Huskies largest athletic donation in the history of University of Connecticut winner of Caribbean American Heritage Awards.

Trisha M. Bailey is a Jamaican former student-athlete, philanthropist, and education activist. She represented UConn Huskies in cross country and track and field. She was the recipient of Luminary Awards in 2022 at the 29th Caribbean American Heritage Awards.

She is best known for her philanthropist activities which include donations to University of Connecticut, Portland, and improving education and development in Jamaica.

A report by Television Jamaica concluded that she is the “Richest Woman in Jamaica”.

== Biography ==
Bailey was born in Jamaica. She grew up in a working-class household in St. Elizabeth Parish, Jamaica. She endured sexual abuse as a youth, followed by domestic violence as an adult.

In 1990, at age 13, she moved with her sister to the US to live with their mother and stepfather. Bailey was raised in East Hartford and now resides in Orlando.

She attended Weaver High School in Hartford and was a track and field athlete. She was a state open 800-meter champion while at the school.

In 1999, she graduated from University of Connecticut College of Liberal Arts and Sciences.

She earned her MBA in 2005 and Ph.D. in 2010 in organizational leadership from University of Phoenix. She holds a Cardiology Certification from New York University Medical School and Pulmonary Certification from the University of Kentucky College of Medicine.

== Career ==
In 1996, Trisha began her career by working as a service manager at Fleet Bank, Hartford, later moving to First Union National Bank, where she served until her transition to the Stock Market in 1999.

In 2005, she founded her own Medical Recruiting Company called Association Medical Recruiters.

She donated to fund research and treatments against blood cancer at The Leukemia and Lymphoma Society.

She gave financial aid and scholarships to 270 Caribbean students through her charity Bailey-Archie's Charitable Foundation.

She made the largest athletic donation in the history of University of Connecticut to renovate and expand the Hugh S. Greer Field House.

=== Unbroken:The Triumphant Story of a Woman’s Journey ===
In June, 2023, she published her memoir Unbroken: The Triumphant Story of a Woman’s Journey in which she narrates her trauma-filled youth and adulthood.

== See also ==
- Caribbean American Heritage Awards
