= Gabriel Abed =

Barbadian diplomat

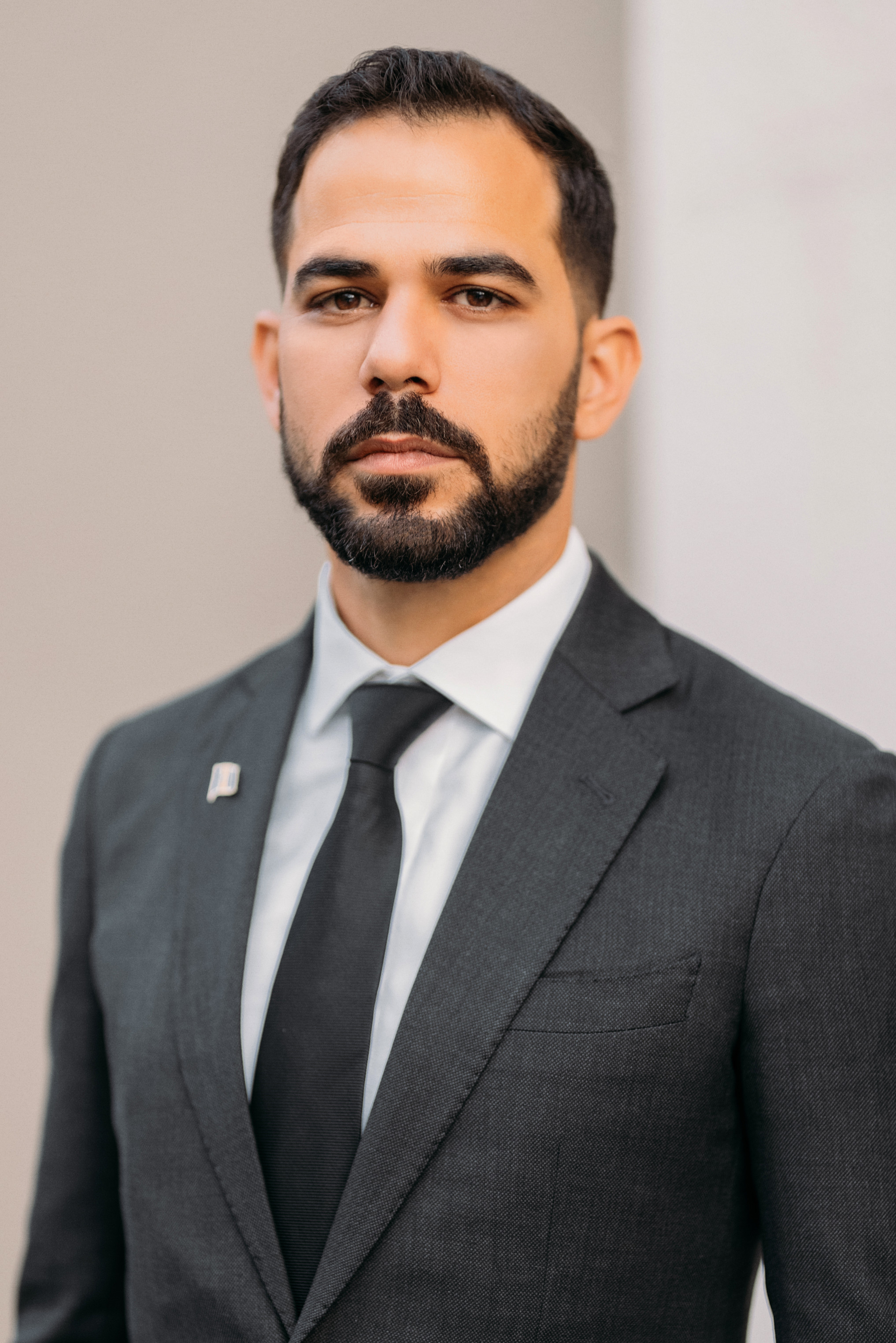
- Education: Queen's College; University of Ontario Institute of Technology
- Occupation: Public servant
- Employer: Government of Barbados
- Known for: Ambassador of Barbados to the United Arab Emirates

Gabriel Abed is a Barbadian diplomat. He is the Ambassador of Barbados to the United Arab Emirates.

== Education ==
Gabriel Abed attended Queen's College, a public secondary school in Barbados. He then attended the University of Ontario Institute of Technology (now Ontario Tech University), where he graduated in 2010 with a degree in Information Network Systems. In 2022, he also received an honorary doctorate degree from the University of the West Indies.

== Career ==
In March 2021, the Government of Barbados announced that Abed would be serving as Ambassador of Barbados to the United Arab Emirates (UAE). His tenure as Ambassador began in August 2021.

Since 2018, Abed has served as a consultant and advisor to the Government of Bermuda.

Abed also established Bitt, a technology company that has worked with companies such as Overstock.com.

As of 2022, Abed is based in Abu Dhabi, United Arab Emirates.

== See also ==
- Foreign relations of Barbados
- Foreign relations of the United Arab Emirates
