= Don Wehby =

Jamaican business executive and politician (1963–2025)

The Honourable Senator Don Wehby OJ CD
- Wehby in 2020

Minister Without Portfolio in the Ministry of Finance and The Public Service
- In office September 2007 – October 2009

Member of the Senate of Jamaica
- In office September 2007 – October 2009
- In office 2016 – 7 November 2024

CEO of GraceKennedy Limited
- In office 2011–2025

Personal details
- Born: 14 July 1963 Kingston, Jamaica
- Died: 26 July 2025 (aged 62)
- Education: University of the West Indies

Donald George Wehby OJ CD (14 July 1963 – 26 July 2025) was a Jamaican business executive and politician. Wehby was group chief executive officer at GraceKennedy Limited, and a Government senator and cabinet minister. In September 2007, he became a senator and Minister Without Portfolio in the Ministry of Finance and The Public Service. On 5 October 2009, he returned to GraceKennedy Limited and became the company's group chief operating officer.

== Education ==
Wehby held a Bachelor of Science degree and a Master of Science degree in Accounting from The University of the West Indies. He also obtained an Advanced Management College certificate from Stanford University.

== Career ==
Wehby first joined GraceKennedy Ltd. in 1995 as group finance manager. He was appointed deputy finance director in 1997 and in that same year was appointed to the board of directors of GraceKennedy Ltd. The following year, he was appointed group chief financial officer and in 1999 undertook the additional role of chief operating officer for the Financial Services Division. In addition, he was charged with the responsibility for leading the group's local and international expansion especially as this relates to banking, investments and insurance services. He directed the listing of the company in Jamaica, Trinidad & Tobago, Barbados and the Eastern Caribbean Securities Exchange sited in St. Kitts. Under his leadership, GraceKennedy acquired 100% ownership of First Global Bank Ltd., now a wholly owned subsidiary of the company.

In December 2005, Wehby relinquished his role as chief operating officer of the Financial Services Division to take on expanded responsibilities as group chief financial officer, which included heading a new strategic planning unit.

In 2006, he was appointed deputy chief executive officer of GraceKennedy Ltd. and chief executive officer of GK Investments.

In September 2007, Wehby resigned from his positions at GraceKennedy Ltd. and its board of directors to serve for two years as Government Senator and Minister without Portfolio in the Ministry of Finance and the Public Service. Following his two-year stint in public service, he was reappointed to the board of directors of GraceKennedy Ltd. on his return to GraceKennedy on 5 October 2009.

On 5 November 2009, Wehby called for governance changes at the Bank of Jamaica, the country's central bank, following the resignation of the bank's governor. He claimed positions of governor and chairman of the bank should be split.

Don Wehby became group chief executive officer of GraceKennedy Limited on 1 July 2011. Prior to this appointment, Wehby was group chief operating officer, a position he took up when he rejoined the company on 5 October 2009.

Wehby took a leave of absence as GraceKennedy Limited, CEO in October 2024 for health reasons, and subsequently resigned from the Jamaica Senate in November 2024 to prioritize his health.

== Affiliations ==
His professional affiliations include chairman of the Taskforce on Tourism Contribution & Linkages. He was also vice-president of the Private Sector Organisation of Jamaica (PSOJ). He previously served the PSOJ as a member of its economic policy committee and honorary treasurer. He also served on the board of directors of his alma mater St. George's College.

A Fellow Chartered Accountant, Wehby gained his early auditing experience at Touche-Ross Thorburn.

== Personal life and death ==
Wehby attended St George's College. He was married with three children. He was an avid cricket fan and a member of the Kingston Cricket Club.

Wehby died on 26 July 2025, at the age of 62.

== Awards ==
Wehby was appointed Commander of the Order of Distinction (CD) in 2017. He was subsequently appointed Member of the Order of Jamaica (OJ) in 2024.
