= Better Than Cash Alliance =

Global partnership of 80 governments, companies, and International Organizations

- Formation: September 2012
- Type: Global partnership
- Purpose: Accelerate the transition from cash to responsible digital payments
- Headquarters: New York, US
- Members: 80 members
- Managing Director: Lucy Nshuti Mbabazi
- Website: www.betterthancash.org

The Better Than Cash Alliance is a global partnership of 80 governments, companies, and International Organizations that accelerates the transition from cash to responsible digital payments to help achieve the Sustainable Development Goals (SDGs).

== History, description and work ==
The Better Than Cash Alliance was created in September 2012. Its founding members were the governments of Colombia, Kenya, Peru, and the Philippines, as well as CARE, Concern Worldwide, Mercy Corps, United Nations Development Programme (UNDP) and World Food Programme (WFP). The United Nations Capital Development Fund serves as the secretariat.

Based at the UN, the Alliance now has 80 members and is an implementing partner for the G20’s Global Partnership for Financial Inclusion (GPFI). The Alliance’s secretariat works closely with member governments, companies and other global organizations. According to its website its members are committed to digitizing payments in order to boost efficiency, transparency, women’s economic participation and financial inclusion, helping build economies that are digital and inclusive. Its website also states that "Members do not want to abolish physical cash, but rather want to provide responsible digital payment options that are 'better than cash'".

The Alliance Secretariat works with members on their journey to digitize payments by:

- Providing advisory services based on their priorities.
- Sharing action-oriented research and fostering peer learning on responsible practices.
- Conducting advocacy at national, regional and global level.

The Bill & Melinda Gates Foundation, Citigroup, the Ford Foundation, the Omidyar Network, the United Nations Capital Development Fund, the United States Agency for International Development (USAID), and Visa Inc. were founding funders of the Alliance. Further current funders include the German Federal Ministry for Economic Cooperation and Development (BMZ), the Mastercard Foundation, the Swedish International Development Cooperation Agency (Sida), and the Swiss State Secretariat for Economic Affairs (SECO).

== Members ==
Members
| Type | Name | Since | Note |
|---|---|---|---|
| Governments | Afghanistan | | |
| Governments | Bangladesh | | |
| Governments | Benin | | |
| Governments | Colombia | | |
| Governments | Côte d'Ivoire | | |
| Governments | Dominican Republic | | |
| Governments | Equatorial Guinea | | |
| Governments | Ethiopia | | |
| Governments | Ghana | | |
| Governments | Fiji | | |
| Governments | Jordan | | |
| Governments | Kenya | | |
| Governments | India | | |
| Governments | Indonesia | | |
| Governments | Liberia | | |
| Governments | Malawi | | |
| Governments | Mexico | 2016 | |
| Governments | Moldova | | |
| Governments | Nepal | | |
| Governments | Pakistan | | |
| Governments | Papua New Guinea | | |
| Governments | Paraguay | | |
| Governments | Peru | | |
| Governments | Philippines | | |
| Governments | Rwanda | | |
| Governments | Senegal | | |
| Governments | Sierra Leone | | |
| Governments | Solomon Islands | | |
| Governments | Sudan | | |
| Governments | Uganda | | |
| Governments | Uruguay | | |
| Governments | Vietnam | | |
| International Organizations | ACDI/VOCA | | |
| International Organizations | Arab Monetary Fund (AMF) | | |
| International Organizations | CARE | | |
| International Organizations | Catholic Relief Services | | |
| International Organizations | Chemonics International | | |
| International Organizations | Clinton Development Initiative | | |
| International Organizations | Concern Worldwide | | |
| International Organizations | European Bank for Reconstruction and Development | | |
| International Organizations | Food and Agriculture Organization (FAO) | | |
| International Organizations | Grameen Foundation | | |
| International Organizations | Inter-American Development Bank | | |
| International Organizations | International Fund for Agricultural Development (IFAD) | | |
| International Organizations | International Labour Organization (ILO) | | |
| International Organizations | International Rescue Committee | | |
| International Organizations | International Telecommunication Union (ITU) | | |
| International Organizations | MEDA | | |
| International Organizations | Mercy Corps | | |
| International Organizations | Save the Children | | |
| International Organizations | Self-Employed Women's Association (SEWA) | | |
| International Organizations | The Global Fund | | |
| International Organizations | United Nations Children’s Emergency Fund (UNICEF) | | |
| International Organizations | United Nations Development Programme (UNDP) | | |
| International Organizations | United Nations Educational, Scientific and Cultural Organization (UNESCO) | | |
| International Organizations | United Nations High Commissioner for Refugees (UNHCR) | | |
| International Organizations | United Nations Population Fund (UNFPA) | | |
| International Organizations | United Nations Secretariat | | |
| International Organizations | Universal Postal Union | | |
| International Organizations | UN Women | | |
| International Organizations | Women's World Banking | | |
| International Organizations | World Food Programme | | |
| International Organizations | World Savings Banks Institute | | |
| Companies | Ethical Tea Partnership (ETP) | | |
| Companies | Gap Inc. | | |
| Companies | Grupo Bimbo | | |
| Companies | H&M | | |
| Companies | Inditex | | |
| Companies | Marks & Spencer | | |
| Companies | PVH | | |
| Companies | The Coca-Cola Company | | |
| Companies | Target | | |
| Companies | Unilever | | |
| Companies | World Cocoa Foundation | | |
