= George C. Fraser =

American author, entrepreneur, and public speaker

- Born: May 1, 1945 (age 80); Brooklyn, New York City, United States
- Education: Minority Business Executive Program New York City Community College, Dartmouth college, Amos Tuck School of Business
- Occupations: Author, entrepreneur, speaker
- Known for: Founder of FraserNet, Inc.
- Website: drgeorgecfraser.com

George C. Fraser (born May 1, 1945) is an American author, entrepreneur, and public speaker. He is the founder of FraserNet, Inc., a business networking organization. Fraser is known for his work related to business networking, professional development, and organizational leadership, particularly through conferences, publications, and speaking engagements.

== Early life and education ==
Fraser was born in Brooklyn, New York City in 1945. During his childhood, he experienced family instability and spent part of his youth in the foster care system. He attended Thomas Edison Career and Technical Education High School.

After high school, Fraser enrolled at New York University, where he pursued undergraduate studies. He later completed executive education at the Amos Tuck School of Business at Dartmouth College. Over the course of his career, Fraser has received honorary doctorate degrees from several institutions, recognizing his professional and civic activities.

== Career ==
=== Corporate and nonprofit work ===
Prior to founding his own company, Fraser worked in management and executive roles in both the private sector and the nonprofit sector. His employers included Procter & Gamble, the United Way, and the Ford Motor Company. His responsibilities involved corporate management, fundraising, and organizational leadership.

=== FraserNet, Inc. ===
In 1987, Fraser and Gregory Williams founded FraserNet, Inc., a membership-based business networking organization. The organization focuses on facilitating professional connections through conferences, seminars, and structured networking events.

FraserNet is known for creating the PowerNetworking Conference, an annual event that brings together business owners, executives, and professionals. The conference includes panel discussions, keynote addresses, and networking sessions addressing topics such as entrepreneurship, leadership, and economic development.

Fraser has authored several books that examine networking, career advancement, and business opportunities. His publications often emphasize relationship-building as a component of professional success.

Selected works include:

- Success Runs in Our Race: The Complete Guide to Effective Networking in the African American Community (1994)
- Race for Success: The Ten Best Business Opportunities for Blacks in America (1998)
- Click: Ten Truths for Building Extraordinary Relationships (2008)
- Who Would Have Thunk It (2012)
- Mission Unstoppable: Extraordinary Stories of Failure's Blessings (2014)
- Whoo Influenced You? (2022)

His books have been distributed through mainstream and specialty publishers and are frequently cited in discussions of professional networking.

Fraser has participated as a speaker at conferences, corporate events, and professional development programs in the United States and abroad. His presentations generally address topics such as networking strategies, leadership development, economic development, and organizational effectiveness.

In addition to his business activities, Fraser has been involved in initiatives related to education and community development. His activities have included participation in advisory boards, mentoring programs, and support for charter school development in underserved communities.

Fraser has received awards and honors related to business leadership, entrepreneurship, and community involvement. These include honorary academic degrees and recognitions from professional and civic organizations. Specific awards and dates require independent sourcing.

- Inducted into the Minority Business Hall of Fame and Museum (2011)
- Presidential Lifetime Achievement Award (2016, during the administration of Barack Obama) awarded in recognition of sustained contributions to leadership, mentorship and community impact.
- Presidential Lifetime Achievement Award (2022, during the administration of Joe Biden) recognizing continued lifetime contributions to leadership development, entrepreneurship and service-oriented initiatives.

Fraser resides in Cleveland, Ohio. He is married to Nora Jean Fraser and has 2 Sons and 3 granddaughters.
