= GraceKennedy =

International conglomerate

GraceKennedy Limited
- Type: Public company
- Traded as: JSE: GK; TTSE: GKC
- Industry: Insurance, Financial, Banking, Remittances, Manufacturing, retail, distribution
- Founded: Jamaica
- Headquarters: Kingston, Jamaica
- Key people: Frank James, CEO
- Products: Financial services, Drinks, Foods
- Website: www.gracekennedy.com

GraceKennedy Limited is one of the Caribbean's largest conglomerates, with several diversified companies in the Caribbean, Europe and North America.

== Group members ==
The group includes:

- Banking and financial services
  - First Global Bank Limited
  - First Global Financial Services Limited
  - FG Funds Management (Cayman) Limited
  - First Global Trinidad & Tobago Limited (formerly One1 Financial Limited)
  - Signia Financial Group Incorporated
- Remittances
  - GraceKennedy Remittance Services Limited
  - GraceKennedy Remittance Services (United States) Incorporated
  - GraceKennedy Remittance Services (Trinidad & Tobago) Limited
  - GraceKennedy Remittance Services (Guyana) Limited
- Insurance (life and general)
  - Allied Insurance Brokers Limited
  - GK General (Eastern Caribbean) Insurance Company Limited
  - First Global Insurance Brokers Limited
  - GK General Insurance Company Limited
  - Trident Insurance Company Limited
- Manufacturing, retail and distribution
  - Dairy Industries (Jamaica) Limited
  - Grace Foods and Services Company
  - GraceKennedy (Belize) Limited
  - Grace Food Processors Limited
  - Grace Food Processors (Canning) Limited
  - GraceKennedy (United States) Incorporated
  - Grace Foods International Limited
  - National Processors Division
  - World Brands Services Limited
  - Hi-Lo Food Stores (Jamaica) Limited
  - GK Foods (United Kingdom) Limited
  - GraceKennedy (Ontario) Incorporated
  - Hardware & Lumber Limited
- Strategic investments
  - Peak Bottling Water
  - Majesty Foods Meat Patties

== History ==
One of the company's founders (Dr. John J. Grace) had worked for Grace Ltd, a wholly owned subsidiary of New York's W. R. Grace and Company. When, in 1922, W.R.Grace decided to divest the Jamaican subsidiary, Dr. Grace bought the company and, along with Fred Kennedy, a Jamaican, co-founded Grace, Kennedy and Company Limited. The company, which first operated as a small trading establishment, soon acquired wharfing facilities in order to facilitate its imports.

It has expanded and diversified over the years, changing from a privately owned enterprise to a public company listed on the stock exchanges of Jamaica, Trinidad, Barbados and the Eastern Caribbean.

Today, the GraceKennedy Group comprises a varied network of some 60 subsidiaries and associated companies located across the Caribbean and in North and Central America and the United Kingdom. Their operations span the food distribution, financial, insurance, remittance, hardware retailing and food-processing industries.

In 1995, GraceKennedy developed its 2020 Vision, the objective being to transform from a Jamaican trading company to a global consumer group by the year 2020. At the end of 2006 its market value stood at J$21 billion, up from $1.29 billion in 1995 - an increase of 1500%.

In March 2020, GraceKennedy acquired 65 percent of Key Insurance Company.
