= Murder of Cyril Sisnett =

1984 murder in Barbados

Cyril Sisnett (1909/1910–December 15, 1984), was a plantation manager and company director in Barbados. That Sisnett was shot dead at Francia Great House, Saint George, aged 74. Two men were charged with the murder and sentenced to death by hanging. Sisnett was survived by his wife, Denise.
