= 2026 in Maryland =

- Decades: 2000s; 2010s; 2020s
- See also: History of Maryland; Historical outline of Maryland; List of years in Maryland; 2026 in the United States

The following is a list of events of the year 2026 in Maryland.

== Incumbents ==
=== State government ===
- Governor: Wes Moore (D)

== Events ==
- March 24 – The city of Baltimore sues xAI, accusing its chatbot Grok of generating sexualized images of people without their consent.
- May 12 – Francis Scott Key Bridge collapse: The companies that operated the cargo ship that hit the Key Bridge and a manager are charged in connection with the collapse that killed six people.
- May 16 – Napoleon Solo wins the 2026 Preakness Stakes.
- July 8 – 33 people are injured after a bus crashes into a building in Pikesville.
- August 1–14 – ICE arrests 1,328 people in a two-week operation in the Washington-area suburbs of Maryland and Virginia.
- November 3 – 2026 Maryland elections:
  - 2026 Maryland Attorney General election
  - 2026 Maryland county executive elections
  - 2026 Maryland gubernatorial election: Wes Moore wins reelection, beating challenger Dan Cox,
  - 2026 Maryland House of Delegates election
  - 2026 Maryland Senate election
  - 2026 United States House of Representatives elections in Maryland

== See also ==
- 2026 in the United States
