= 2024 in Maryland =

- Decades: 2000s; 2010s; 2020s
- See also: History of Maryland; Historical outline of Maryland; List of years in Maryland; 2024 in the United States

The following is a list of events of the year 2024 in Maryland.

== Incumbents ==
=== State government ===
- Governor: Wes Moore (D)

== Events ==
- March 26 – The Francis Scott Key Bridge in Baltimore collapses after the container ship Dali strikes a bridge column, causing multiple vehicles to fall into the water below.
- May 13 – The final remains of the collapsed Francis Scott Key Bridge in Baltimore, which killed six workers, are demolished with explosives.
- May 14 –
  - 2024 Maryland Democratic presidential primary.
  - 2024 Maryland Republican presidential primary.
- June 6 – A number of people are injured by tornadoes in Maryland.
- June 17 – Governor Wes Moore pardons more than 175,000 people with low-level marijuana convictions.
- August 11 – Two people are killed and twelve families are displaced in an explosion possibly attributed to a gas leak in Bel Air.

== See also ==
- 2024 in the United States
