= 2023 in Maryland =

- Decades: 2000s; 2010s; 2020s
- See also: History of Maryland; Historical outline of Maryland; List of years in Maryland; 2023 in the United States

The following is a list of events of the year 2023 in Maryland.

== Incumbents ==
=== State government ===
- Governor: Wes Moore (D)

== Events ==
- June 28 – Smoke from the wildfires in Canada reaches several U.S. states including Maryland.
- July 2 – 2023 Baltimore shooting: Two people are killed and 28 others are injured in a mass shooting at a block party in Baltimore.

== See also ==
- 2023 in the United States
