= 2022 in Maryland =

- Decades: 2000s; 2010s; 2020s
- See also: History of Maryland; Historical outline of Maryland; List of years in Maryland; 2022 in the United States

The following is a list of events of the year 2022 in Maryland.

== Incumbents ==
=== State government ===
- Governor: Larry Hogan (R)

== Events ==
- January 10: Doctors at the University of Maryland, Baltimore, successfully transplant a pig heart into a human patient for the first time.
- May 21: An early heat wave in the United States sets all-time high records for May 21 in several cities in several states, including Maryland.
- May 22: Twenty-seven people are injured after a bus rolls over near Kingsville.
- June 9:
  - Governor Larry Hogan outlines a long-term preparedness plan on how Maryland will deal with COVID-19 including a focus on treatments that would keep people out of hospitals as well as on how the state would respond to future variants.
  - Three people are killed and another is injured in a mass shooting in Smithsburg.

== Death ==
- January 12: Stephen H. Sachs, 87, lawyer and politician, U.S. attorney for the District of Maryland (1967–1970) and attorney general of Maryland (1979–1987).

== See also ==
- 2022 in the United States
