= 2025 in Maryland =

- Decades: 2000s; 2010s; 2020s
- See also: History of Maryland; Historical outline of Maryland; List of years in Maryland; 2025 in the United States

The following is a list of events of the year 2025 in Maryland.

== Incumbents ==
=== State government ===
- Governor: Wes Moore (D)

== Events ==
=== January ===
- January 5 – Maryland is impacted by the January 5–6, 2025 United States blizzard.
- January 19-20 – Maryland is affected by a nor'easter.

=== March ===
- March 12 – Salvadoran immigrant Kilmar Abrego Garcia is detained by Immigration and Customs Enforcement agents. Three days later, he is illegally deported to El Salvador and sent to the Terrorism Confinement Center (CECOT).

=== April ===
- April 10 – The Supreme Court unanimously rules Abrego Garcia was illegally deported and requires. the U.S. to "facilitate" Abrego Garcia's release. Despite this, both President Donald Trump and Salvadoran President Nayib Bukele refuse to release Abrego Garcia.

=== May ===
- May 1 – Six Flags announces that Six Flags America in Bowie will be closing at the end of the 2025 season.
- May 17 – Journalism wins the 2025 Preakness Stakes, held in Baltimore.

=== June ===
- June 3 – 2025 Prince George's County executive special election
- June 5 – Over 2,000 gallons of oil are spilled into the Baltimore Harbor from a pipeline at Johns Hopkins Hospital.
- June 6 – Abrego Garcia is returned to the United States and charged with unlawful transportation of illegal aliens in the United States.

=== July ===
- July 30 – Francis Scott Key Bridge collapse: The city of Baltimore, begins demolition on the last pieces of the Francis Scott Key Bridge after its collapse in 2024. Its replacement is expected to open in 2028.

=== August ===
- August 10 – Six people, including four children, are killed in a house fire in Waldorf.
- August 22 – The FBI raids the Bethesda home of former national security advisor John Bolton.

=== September ===
- September 18 – Maryland joins nine other states in the Northeast Public Health Collaborative, a collaborative health agency among Northeastern states.

=== October ===
- October 18 – A driver hits an outdoor birthday party in Bladensburg, killing a woman and injuring 13 people, including eight children.

=== November ===
- November 5 – 2025 Annapolis mayoral election: Jared Littmann wins election.

=== December ===
- December 11 – A judge orders the release of Kilmar Abrego Garcia from a Pennsylvania facility. 14 hours later, the judge also blocks immigration officials from taking Abrego Garcia into custody.
- December 24 – Federal immigration agents shoot two people during an operation in Glen Burnie.

== See also ==
- 2025 in the United States
