= 2026 Maryland county executive elections =

- November 3, 2026

8 of Maryland's 9 county executive seats
	Majority party	Minority party
Party	Democratic	Republican
Last election	6	3
Seats won	7	2
Seat change	▲1	▼1
- Results of the elections: Democratic hold Democratic gain Republican hold

The Maryland county executive elections of 2026 were held on November 3, 2026. Anne Arundel County, Baltimore County, Frederick County, Harford County, Howard County, Montgomery County, Prince George's County, and Wicomico County elected county executives.

== Race summary ==
Retiring incumbents by district Democratic incumbent ran Democratic incumbent retired or term-limited Republican incumbent ran

County	County executive	Party	First elected	Last race	Status	Candidates
Anne Arundel County	Steuart Pittman	Democratic	2018	53.7% D	Incumbent term-limited. Democratic hold.	▌Allison Pickard (Democratic) 61.0%; ▌Dave Crawford (Republican) 38.9%
Baltimore County	Kathy Klausmeier	Democratic	2025 (Note: Klausmeier took office after her predecessor, Johnny Olszewski, resigned. She did not run for election to a full term.)	63.7% D	Incumbent retired. Democratic hold.	▌Julian Jones (Democratic) 65.0%; ▌Patrick Dyer (Republican) 34.6%
Frederick County	Jessica Fitzwater	Democratic	2022	50.4% D	Incumbent re-elected.	▌Jessica Fitzwater (Democratic) 59.4%; ▌William Holtzinger (Republican) 40.4%
Harford County	Robert Cassilly	Republican	2022	64.1% R	Incumbent re-elected.	▌Robert Cassilly (Republican) 54.8%; ▌Barbara Osborn Kreamer (Democratic) 44.9%
Howard County	Calvin Ball III	Democratic	2018	59.1% D	Incumbent term-limited. Democratic hold.	▌Vanessa Atterbeary (Democratic) 81.5%; ▌Nater Kane (Green) 16.6%
Montgomery County	Marc Elrich	Democratic	2018	75.1% D	Incumbent term-limited. Democratic hold.	▌Will Jawando (Democratic) 78.9%; ▌Esther Wells (Republican) 20.7%
Prince George's County	Aisha Braveboy	Democratic	2025 (special)	91.2% D	Incumbent re-elected	▌ ✓ Aisha Braveboy (Democratic)
Wicomico County	Julie Giordano	Republican	2022	51.2% R	Incumbent lost re-election. Democratic gain.	▌Ernest Davis (Democratic) 54.0%; ▌Julie Giordano (Republican) 45.8%

== Anne Arundel County ==
2026 Anne Arundel county executive election

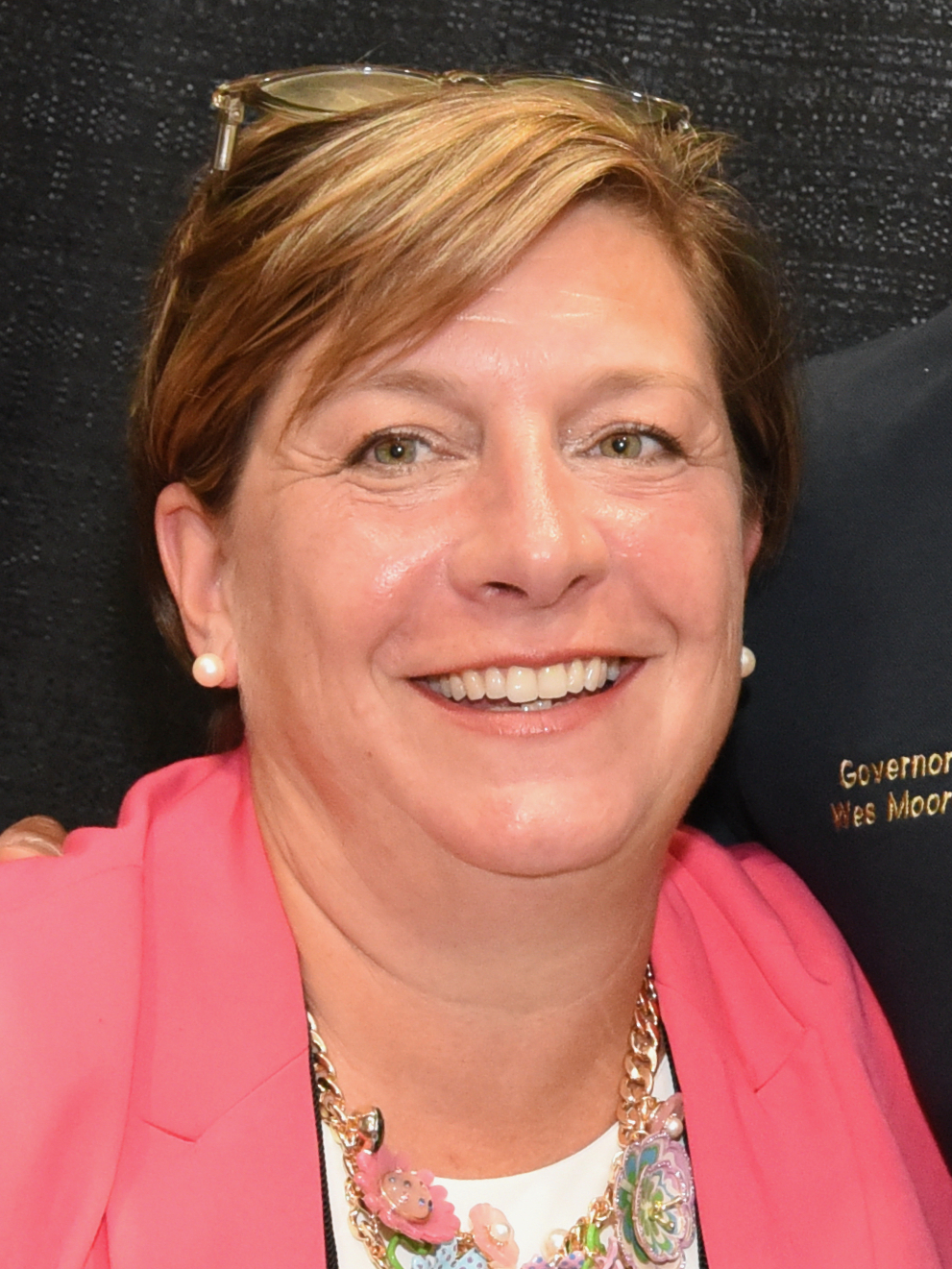

Nominee	Allison Pickard	Dave Crawford
Party	Democratic	Republican
Popular vote	141,041	89,948
Percentage	61.0%	38.9%
- Pickard: 50–60% 60–70% 70–80% 80–90% >90% Crawford: 50–60% 60–70% 70–80% >90%
County Executive before election
Steuart Pittman
Democratic
Elected County Executive
Allison Pickard
Democratic

The incumbent county executive is Democrat Steuart Pittman, who was re-elected in 2022 with 53.7 percent of the vote. He is ineligible to run for a third term due to term limits.

Anne Arundel County councilmember Allison Pickard won the Democratic primary on June 23, 2026, while food service manager Dave Crawford ran unopposed in the Republican primary. Pickard defeated Crawford in the general election on November 3, 2026.

=== Democratic primary ===
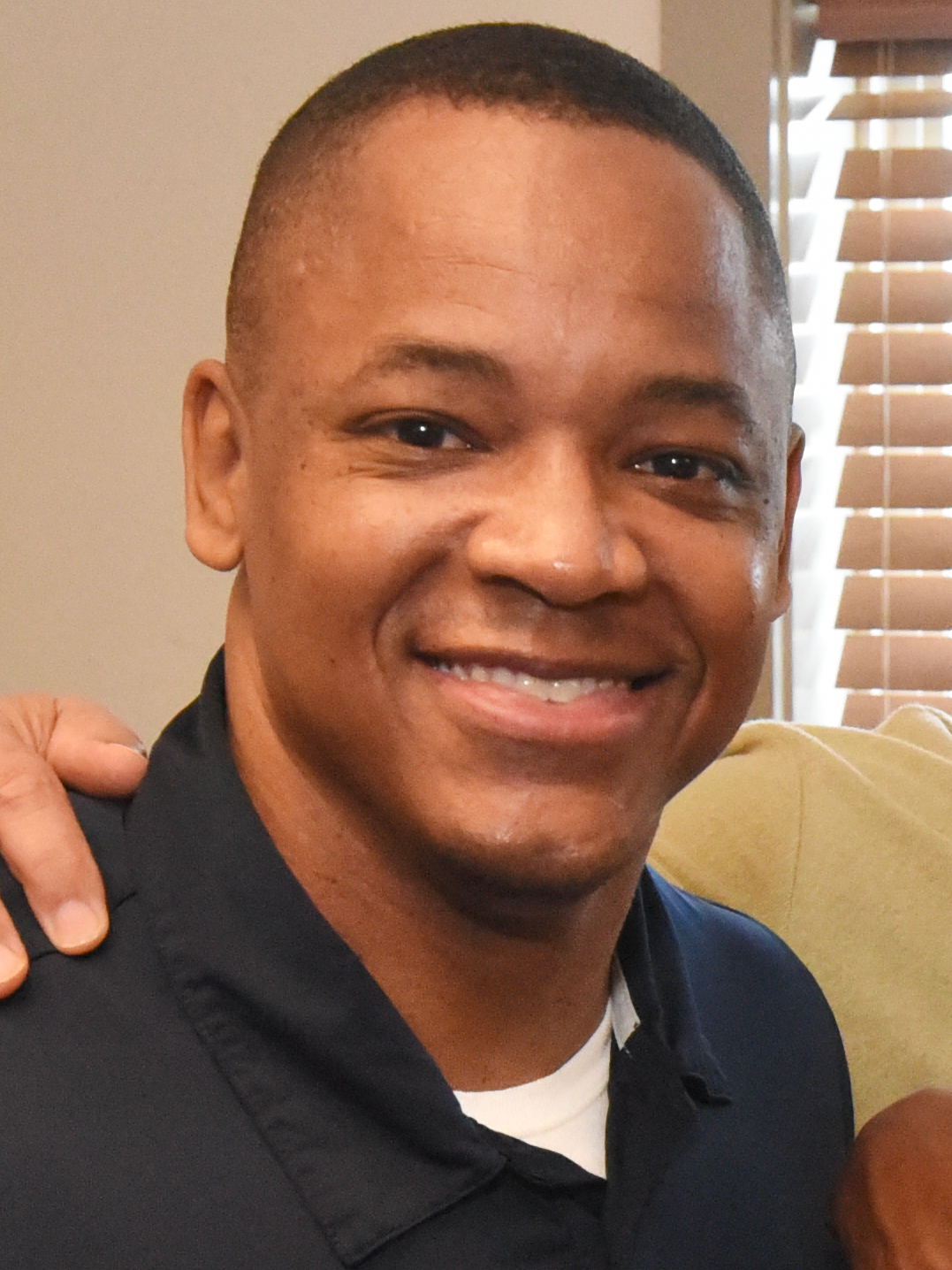
Anne Arundel County councilmember Pete Smith placed third in the Democratic primary.

==== Candidates ====
===== Nominee =====
- Allison Pickard, county councilmember from the 2nd district (2018–present)

===== Eliminated in primary =====
- James Kitchin, special assistant to county executive Steuart Pittman
- Pete Smith, county councilmember from the 1st district (2012–2013, 2014–2018, 2022–present)

===== Withdrew =====
- Kyle Nembhard, Amtrak program manager (remained on ballot, endorsed Kitchin)

===== Declined =====
- Gavin Buckley, former mayor of Annapolis (2017–2025) (ran for county council)

==== Endorsements ====
James Kitchin

County officials

- Steuart Pittman, Anne Arundel county executive (2018–present)
- Lisa Rodvien, county councilmember from the 6th district (2018–present)

Labor unions

- Maryland State Education Association

Organizations

- Moms Demand Action (co-endorsed with Pickard and Smith)
Allison Pickard

U.S. representatives

- Sarah Elfreth, MD-03 (2025–present)

State legislators

- J. Sandy Bartlett, state delegate from the 32nd district (2019–present)
- Pamela Beidle, state senator from the 32nd district (2019–present)
- Mark S. Chang, state delegate from the 32nd district (2015–present)
- Dawn Gile, state senator from the 33rd district (2023–present)
- Dana Jones, state delegate from district 30A (2020–present)
- Andrew Pruski, state delegate from district 33A (2023–present)

County officials

- Julie Hummer, county councilmember from the 4th district (2022–present)

Labor unions

- American Federation of State, County and Municipal Employees Council 3
- Laborers' International Union of North America Philadelphia/Baltimore/Washington Laborers' District Council

Organizations

- Moms Demand Action (co-endorsed with Kitchin and Smith)
Pete Smith

Statewide officials

- Anthony Brown, Maryland Attorney General (2023–present)
- Dereck E. Davis, Maryland State Treasurer (2021–present)

State legislators

- Shaneka Henson, state senator from the 30th district (2025–present)
- Mike Rogers, state delegate from the 32nd district (2019–present)

County officials

- George F. Johnson IV, former Anne Arundel County sheriff (1994–2006) and nominee for county executive in 2006

Organizations

- CASA in Action
- Moms Demand Action (co-endorsed with Kitchin and Pickard)
- VoteVets.org

==== Debates and forums ====
2026 Anne Arundel County executive Democratic primary debates
No.	Date	Host	Participants			
P Participant A Absent N Non-invitee I Invitee W Withdrawn						
P Participant A Absent N Non-invitee I Invitee W Withdrawn			Kitchin	Nembhard	Pickard	Smith
1	Apr 14, 2026	Caucus of African American Leaders	P	P	P	P
2	May 7, 2026	Anne Arundel Affordable Housing Coalition	P	A	P	P

==== Fundraising ====
Kitchin's campaign is utilizing public financing through the Public Campaign Financing System, while Pickard and Smith opted against using public financing for their campaigns.

Campaign finance reports as of June 7, 2026
Candidate	Raised	Spent	Cash on hand
James Kitchin (D)	$544,705	$454,485	$90,220
Kyle Nembhard (D)	$599	$84	$329
Allison Pickard (D)	$755,937	$554,908	$204,650
Pete Smith (D)	$768,316	$707,898	$66,202
Source: Maryland State Board of Elections

==== Polling ====
Poll source	Date(s) administered	Sample size (Note: Key: A – all adults RV – registered voters LV – likely voters V – unclear)	Margin of error	James Kitchin	Kyle Nembhard	Allison Pickard	Pete Smith
Anne Arundel Community College	April 6–16, 2026	98 (RV)	–	38%	2%	33%	30%

==== Results ====
Results by precinct Pickard: 30–40%; 40–50%; 50–60%; 60–70%; Kitchin: 30–40%; 40–50%; 50–60%; 60–70%; Smith: 30–40%; 40–50%; 50–60%; 60–70%; >90%

Democratic primary results
Party	Candidate	Votes	%
Democratic	Allison Pickard	21,662	42.89%
Democratic	James Kitchin	14,872	29.44%
Democratic	Pete Smith	12,757	25.26%
Democratic	Kyle Nembhard (withdrawn)	1,220	2.42%
Total votes		50,511	100.00%

=== Republican primary ===
==== Candidates ====
===== Nominee =====
- Dave Crawford, food service manager and volunteer firefighter

===== Declined =====
- Nic Kipke, state delegate from the 31st district (2007–present) and former minority leader of the Maryland House of Delegates (2013–2021) (ran for state senate)

==== Endorsements ====
Dave Crawford

Organizations

- Maryland Right to Life

==== Fundraising ====
Campaign finance reports as of June 7, 2026
Candidate	Raised	Spent	Cash on hand
Dave Crawford (R)	$78,615 (Note: $62,500 of this total was self-funded by Crawford)	$29,091	$48,662
Source: Maryland State Board of Elections

==== Results ====
Republican primary results
Party	Candidate	Votes	%
Republican	Dave Crawford	17,961	100.00%
Total votes		17,961	100.00%

=== General election ===
==== Debates and forums ====
2026 Anne Arundel County executive election debates
No.	Date	Host	Participants	
P Participant A Absent N Non-invitee I Invitee W Withdrawn				
P Participant A Absent N Non-invitee I Invitee W Withdrawn			Pickard	Crawford
1	Oct 15, 2026	Capital Gazette	P	P

==== Fundraising ====
Campaign finance reports as of November 10, 2026
Candidate	Raised	Spent	Cash on hand
Allison Pickard (D)	$1,085,862	$966,633	$119,409
Dave Crawford (R)	$130,354 (Note: $62,500 of this total was self-funded by Crawford)	$123,408	$2,834
Source: Maryland State Board of Elections

==== Results ====
2026 Anne Arundel county executive election
Party	Candidate	Votes	%	±%
Democratic	Allison Pickard	141,041	60.98%	−7.24%
Republican	Dave Crawford	89,948	38.89%	−7.20%
Write-in		294	0.13%	-0.04%
Total votes		231,283	100.00%	

== Baltimore County ==
2026 Baltimore County executive election

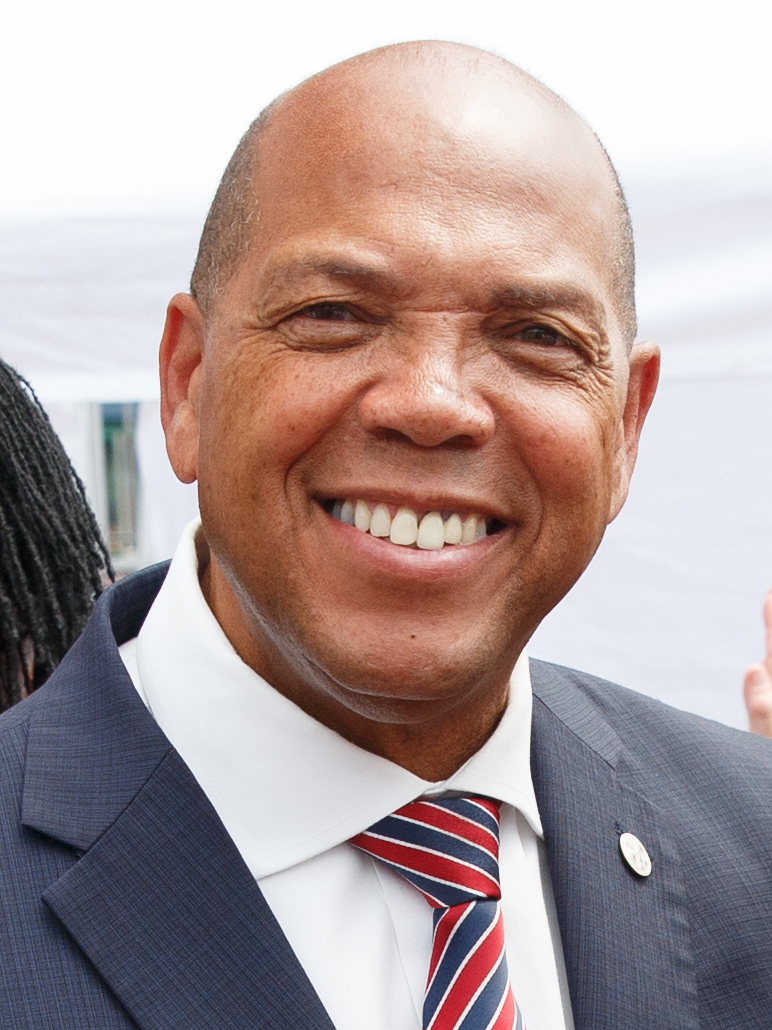

Nominee	Julian Jones	Patrick Dyer
Party	Democratic	Republican
Popular vote	195,358	103,887
Percentage	65.0%	34.6%
- Jones: 50–60% 60–70% 70–80% 80–90% >90% Dyer: 50–60% 60–70% 70–80% 80–90% Tie: 50%
County Executive before election
Kathy Klausmeier
Democratic
Elected County Executive
Julian Jones
Democratic

The incumbent county executive is Democrat Kathy Klausmeier, who was appointed county executive by the Baltimore County Council after Johnny Olszewski was elected to the U.S. House of Representatives in Maryland's 2nd congressional district in 2024. She is not running for election to a full four-year term. Olszewski was re-elected in 2022 with 63.7 percent of the vote.

Primary elections were held on June 23, 2026, with Baltimore County councilmember Julian Jones won the Democratic primary and businessman Patrick Dyer winning the Republican primary. Jones defeated Dyer in the general election on November 3, 2026, becoming the county's first Black county executive.

=== Democratic primary ===
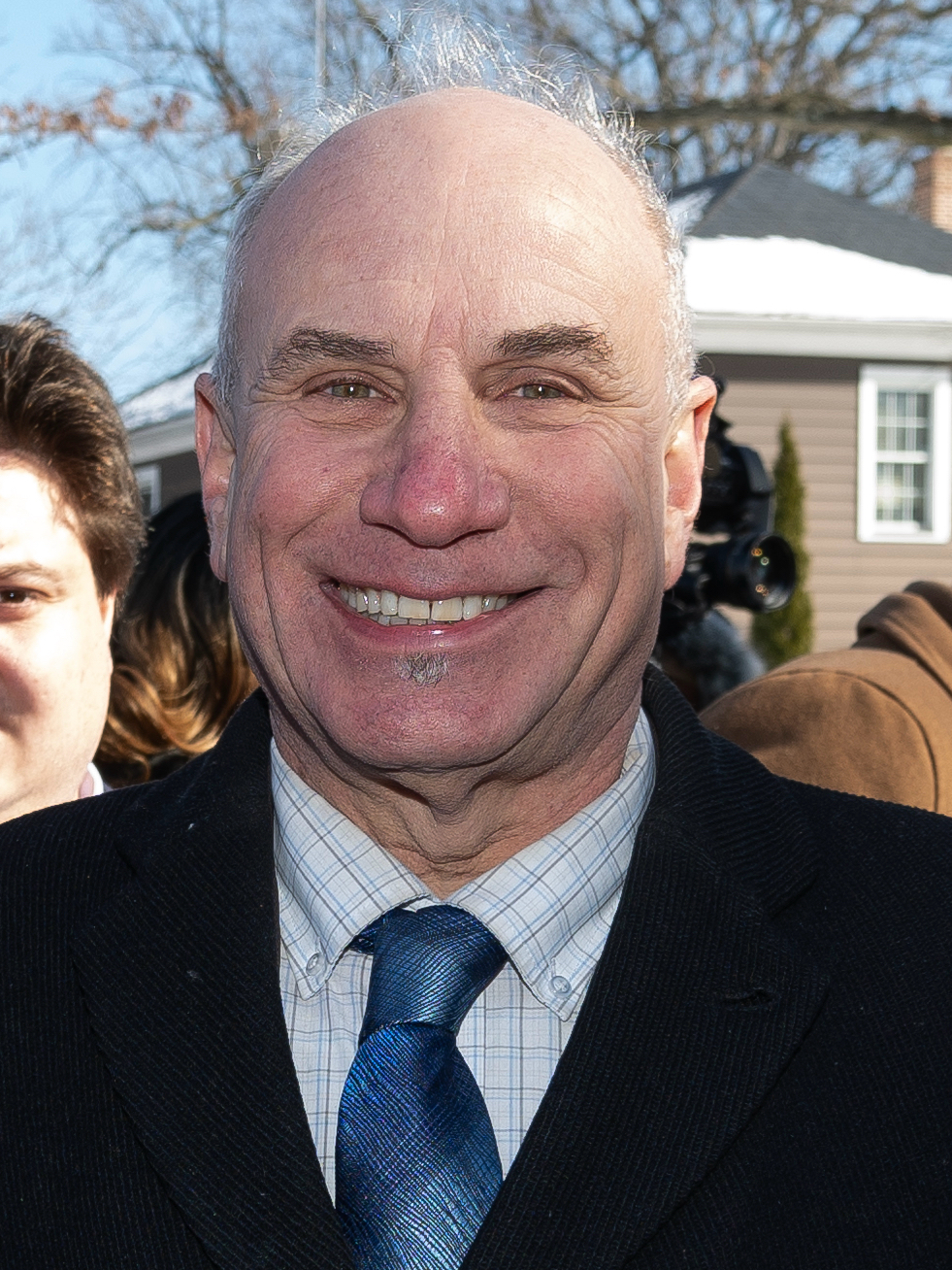
Izzy Patoka

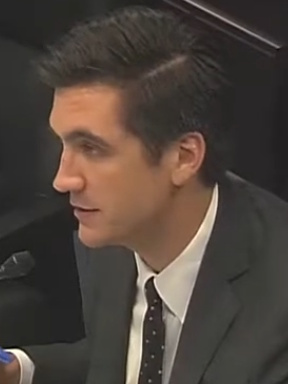
Nick Stewart

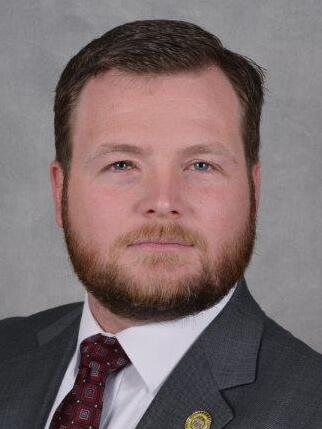
Pat Young

==== Candidates ====
===== Nominee =====
- Julian Jones, county councilmember from the 4th district (2014–present)

===== Eliminated in primary =====
- Izzy Patoka, county councilmember from the 2nd district (2018–present)
- Mansoor Shams, Baltimore County Department of Recreation and Parks official
- Nick Stewart, attorney and former member of the Baltimore County Board of Education
- Pat Young, county councilmember from the 1st district (2022–present)

===== Declined =====
- James Brochin, former state senator from the 42nd district (2003–2019) and candidate for county executive in 2018
- Mike Ertel, county councilmember from the 6th district (2022–present) (ran for re-election)
- Kathy Klausmeier, incumbent county executive
- Charles E. Sydnor III, state senator from the 44th district (2020–present) (ran for re-election)

==== Endorsements ====
Julian Jones

U.S. senators

- Angela Alsobrooks, U.S. senator from Maryland (2025–present)

U.S. representatives

- Kweisi Mfume, MD-07 (1987–1996, 2020–present)
- Johnny Olszewski, MD-02 (2025–present)

Statewide officials

- Wes Moore, Maryland governor (2023–present)

State legislators

- Adrienne A. Jones, state delegate from the 10th district (1997–present) and former speaker of the Maryland House of Delegates (2019–2025)

County officials

- Ivan Bates, Baltimore State's Attorney (2023–present)
- Scott Shellenberger, Baltimore County state's attorney (2007–present)

Labor unions

- American Federation of Government Employees
- SMART

Organizations

- Council on American–Islamic Relations Action
- Moms Demand Action (co-endorsed with Patoka, Stewart, and Young)

Newspapers

- Baltimore Afro-American
Izzy Patoka

U.S. executive branch officials

- Martin O'Malley, former commissioner of the Social Security Administration (2023–2024) and governor of Maryland (2007–2015)

State legislators

- Cathi Forbes, state delegate from district 43B (2019–present)
- Delores Kelley, former state senator from the 10th district (1995–2023)

Local officials

- Yitzy Schleifer, Baltimore city councilmember from the 5th district (2016–present)

Labor unions

- Maryland State Education Association

Organizations

- CASA in Action
- Clean Water Action
- Maryland Sierra Club
- Moms Demand Action (co-endorsed with Jones, Stewart, and Young)
Nick Stewart

Statewide officials

- James T. Smith Jr., former Maryland secretary of transportation (2013–2015) and Baltimore county executive (2002–2010)

County officials

- Vicki Almond, county counclmember from the 2nd district (2010–2018) and candidate for county executive in 2018
- Tom Quirk, county councilmember from the 1st district (2010–2022)

Labor unions

- Baltimore County Fraternal Order of Police

Organizations

- FreeState Equality
- Maryland National Organization for Women
- Moms Demand Action (co-endorsed with Jones, Patoka, and Young)
Pat Young

Labor unions

- International Union of Painters and Allied Trades District Council 51

Organizations

- Moms Demand Action (co-endorsed with Jones, Patoka, and Stewart)
- VoteVets.org

==== Debates and forums ====
2026 Baltimore County executive Democratic primary debates
No.	Date	Host	Participants				
P Participant A Absent N Non-invitee I Invitee W Withdrawn							
P Participant A Absent N Non-invitee I Invitee W Withdrawn			Jones	Patoka	Shams	Stewart	Young
1	Mar 26, 2026	League of Women Voters of Baltimore County	P	P	P	P	P
2	Apr 29, 2026	Greater Baltimore Board of Realtors; Goucher College	P	P	P	P	P
3	May 15, 2026	WBFF-TV	P	P	P	P	P

==== Fundraising ====
Shams and Young utilized public financing for their campaigns through the Fair Election Fund, while Jones, Patoka, and Stewart opted against public financing.

Campaign finance reports as of June 7, 2026
Candidate	Raised	Spent	Cash on hand
Julian Jones (D)	$1,471,027	$1,231,088	$709,249
Izzy Patoka (D)	$1,165,145	$1,570,020	$230,208
Mansoor Shams (D)	$33,162	$15,315	$17,847
Nick Stewart (D)	$540,768	$488,279	$47,069
Pat Young (D)	$298,239	$226,969	$71,270
Source: Maryland State Board of Elections

==== Polling ====
Poll source	Date(s) administered	Sample size	Margin of error	Julian Jones	Izzy Patoka	Mansoor Shams	Nick Stewart	Pat Young
Workbench Strategies (D) (Note: Poll sponsored by Patoka's campaign)	March 2–5, 2026	600 (LV)	± 4.37%	24%	31%	5%	8%	16%

==== Results ====
Results by precinct Jones: 20–30%; 30–40%; 40–50%; 50–60%; 60–70%; 70–80%; Patoka: 20–30%; 30–40%; 40–50%; 50–60%; 60–70%; 70–80%; >90%; Stewart: 20–30%; 30–40%; 40–50%; Young: 30–40%; 40–50%; 60–70%; Tie: 20–30%; 30–40%; 50%

Democratic primary results
Party	Candidate	Votes	%
Democratic	Julian Jones	33,505	38.06%
Democratic	Izzy Patoka	26,469	30.07%
Democratic	Nick Stewart	16,067	18.25%
Democratic	Pat Young	8,242	9.36%
Democratic	Mansoor Shams	3,751	4.26%
Total votes		88,034	100.00%

=== Republican primary ===
==== Candidates ====
===== Nominee =====
- Patrick Dyer, businessman and nominee for HD-11 in 2006

===== Eliminated in primary =====
- Kim Stansbury, businesswoman and candidate for county executive in 2022

===== Declined =====
- Todd Crandell, county councilmember from the 7th district (2014–present)
- David Marks, county councilmember from the 5th district (2010–present) (ran for re-election)

==== Endorsements ====
Patrick Dyer

County officials

- Nino Mangione, county councilmember from the 3rd district (2026–present)

==== Debates and forums ====
2026 Baltimore County executive Republican primary debates
No.	Date	Host	Participants	
P Participant A Absent N Non-invitee I Invitee W Withdrawn				
P Participant A Absent N Non-invitee I Invitee W Withdrawn			Dyer	Stansbury
1	Mar 26, 2026	League of Women Voters of Baltimore County	P	P
2	Apr 29, 2026	Greater Baltimore Board of Realtors; Goucher College	P	P

==== Fundraising ====
Campaign finance reports as of June 7, 2026
Candidate	Raised	Spent	Cash on hand
Patrick Dyer (R)	$50,927	$31,349	$19,578
Kim Stansbury (R)	$19,140	$7,112	$3,486
Source: Maryland State Board of Elections

==== Results ====
Results by precinct Dyer: 50–60%; 60–70%; 70–80%; 80–90%; >90%; Stansbury: 50–60%; 60–70%; 70–80%; >90%; Tie

Republican primary results
Party	Candidate	Votes	%
Republican	Patrick Dyer	17,850	64.80%
Republican	Kim Stansbury	9,696	35.20%
Total votes		27,546	100.00%

=== Independents ===
==== Candidates ====
===== Did not qualify =====
- Rob Daniels (Independent), attorney

==== Fundraising ====
Campaign finance reports as of June 7, 2026
Candidate	Raised	Spent	Cash on hand
Rob Daniels (I)	$34,332	$42,099	$4,051
Source: Maryland State Board of Elections

=== General election ===
==== Fundraising ====
Campaign finance reports as of November 10, 2026
Candidate	Raised	Spent	Cash on hand
Julian Jones (D)	$1,979,178	$2,287,889	$151,352
Patrick Dyer (R)	$128,998	$121,753	$5,320
Source: Maryland State Board of Elections

==== Results ====
2026 Baltimore County executive election
Party	Candidate	Votes	%	±%
Democratic	Julian Jones	195,358	64.99%	+1.31%
Republican	Patrick Dyer	103,887	34.56%	−1.54%
Write-in		1,368	0.46%	+0.23%
Total votes		300,613	100.00%	

== Frederick County ==
2026 Frederick County executive election

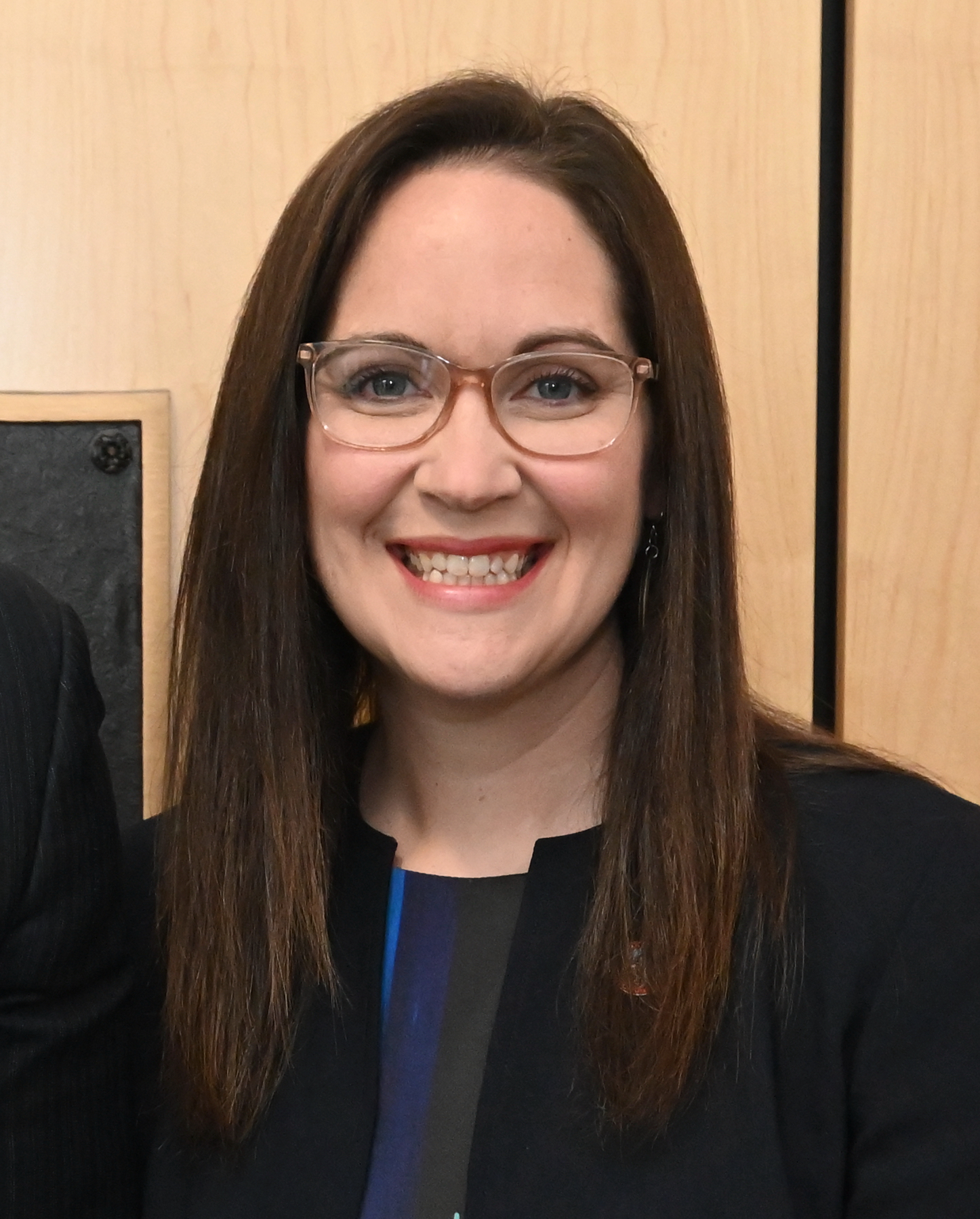

Nominee	Jessica Fitzwater	William Holtzinger
Party	Democratic	Republican
Popular vote	68,331	46,525
Percentage	59.4%	40.4%
- Fitzwater: 50–60% 60–70% 70–80% 80–90% >90% Holtzinger: 50–60% 60–70% 70–80%
County Executive before election
Jessica Fitzwater
Democratic
Elected County Executive
Jessica Fitzwater
Democratic

The incumbent county executive is Democrat Jessica Fitzwater, who was elected in 2022 with 50.4 percent of the vote. She is running for reelection to a second term.

Primary elections were held on June 23, 2026. Fitzwater ran unopposed in the Democratic primary, while former Frederick mayor Jeff Holtzinger won the Republican primary. Fitzwater defeated Holtzinger on the general election on November 3, 2026.

=== Democratic primary ===
==== Candidates ====
===== Nominee =====
- Jessica Fitzwater, incumbent county executive

==== Endorsements ====
Endorsements in bold were made after the primary elections.

Jessica Fitzwater

U.S. senators

- **Chris Van Hollen**, Maryland (2017–present)

U.S. representatives

- **April McClain Delaney**, MD-06 (2025–present)
- **Jamie Raskin**, MD-08 (2017–present)

Statewide officials

- Wes Moore, Maryland governor (2023–present)

Labor unions

- American Federation of State, County and Municipal Employees Council 3
- Maryland State Education Association

Organizations

- FreeState Equality
- Maryland National Organization for Women
- Moms Demand Action

==== Fundraising ====
Campaign finance reports as of June 7, 2026
Candidate	Raised	Spent	Cash on hand
Jessica Fitzwater (D)	$619,072	$363,158	$287,391
Source: Maryland State Board of Elections

==== Results ====
Democratic primary results
Party	Candidate	Votes	%
**Democratic**	**Jessica Fitzwater (incumbent)**	**20,409**	**100.00%**
Total votes		**20,409**	**100.00%**

=== Republican primary ===
==== Candidates ====
===== Nominee =====
- William Holtzinger, former mayor of Frederick (2005–2009) and candidate for mayor in 2013

===== Eliminated in primary =====
- Diane Fouche, former director of the Frederick County Office of Procurement and Contracting

===== Declined =====
- Chuck Jenkins, Frederick County sheriff (2006–present) (ran for re-election)

==== Fundraising ====
Campaign finance reports as of June 7, 2026
Candidate	Raised	Spent	Cash on hand
Diane Fouche (R)	$14,349	$8,689	$4,281
William Holtzinger (R)	$10,343	$4,195	$3,791
Source: Maryland State Board of Elections

==== Results ====
Results by precinct Holtzinger: 50–60%; 60–70%; 70–80%; Fouche: 50–60%; 60–70%; 70–80%

Republican primary results
Party	Candidate	Votes	%
**Republican**	**William Holtzinger**	**9,213**	**57.57%**
Republican	Diane Fouche	6,789	42.43%
Total votes		**16,002**	**100.00%**

=== General election ===
==== Fundraising ====
Campaign finance reports as of November 10, 2026
Candidate	Raised	Spent	Cash on hand
Jessica Fitzwater (D)	$822,965	$696,211	$158,231
William Holtzinger (R)	$55,310	$46,413	$8,897
Source: Maryland State Board of Elections

==== Results ====
2026 Frederick County executive election
Party	Candidate	Votes	%	±%
Democratic	Jessica Fitzwater (incumbent)	68,331	59.36%	+8.96%
Republican	William Holtzinger	46,525	40.42%	−9.04%
Write-in		250	0.22%	-0.08%
Total votes		**115,106**	**100.00%**	

== Harford County ==
2026 Harford County executive election

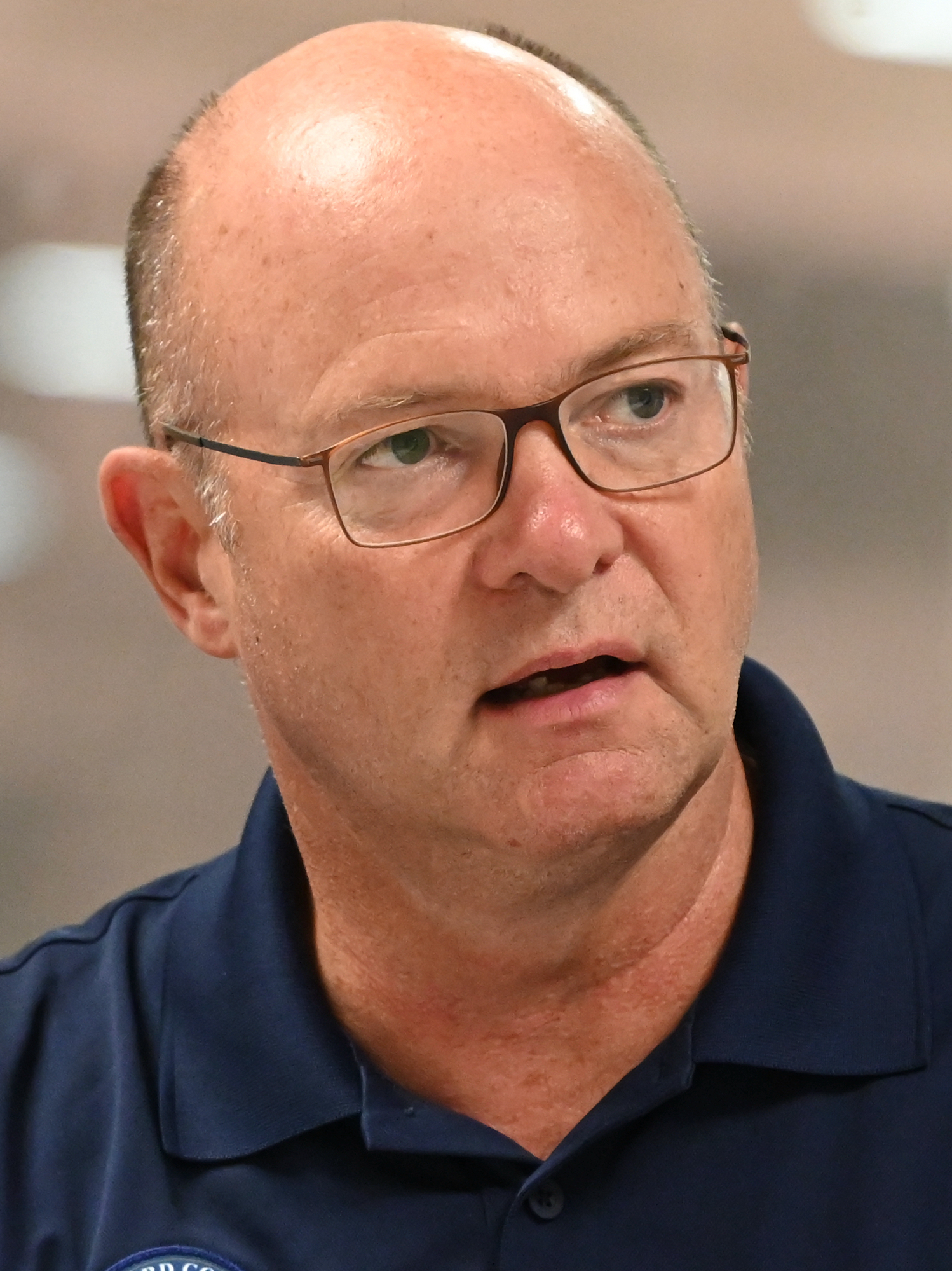

Nominee	Robert Cassilly	Barbara Osborn Kreamer
Party	Republican	Democratic
Popular vote	60,314	49,373
Percentage	54.8%	44.9%
- Cassilly: 50–60% 60–70% 70–80% Kreamer: 50–60% 60–70% 70–80%
County Executive before election
Robert Cassilly
Republican
Elected County Executive
Robert Cassilly
Republican

The incumbent county executive is Republican Robert Cassilly, who was elected in 2022 with 64.1 percent of the vote. He ran for reelection to a second term.

Primary elections were held on June 23, 2026. Cassilly won the Republican primary, fending off a primary challenge from Harford County Council president Patrick Vincenti. Cassilly defeated former state delegate Barbara Osborn Kreamer in the general election on November 3, 2026.

=== Republican primary ===
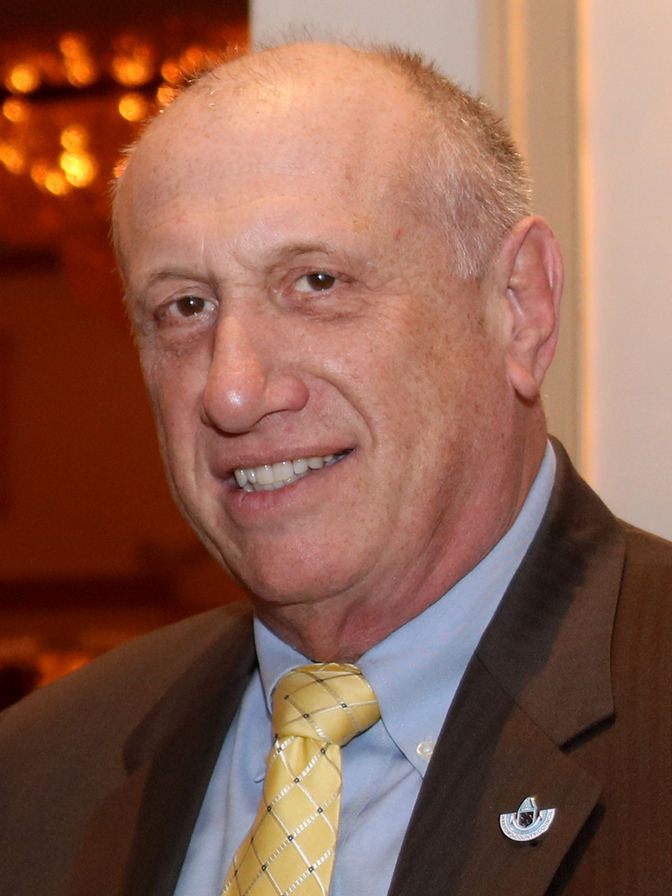
Cassilly faced a primary challenge from Harford County Council president Patrick Vincenti.

==== Candidates ====
===== Nominee =====
- Bob Cassilly, incumbent county executive

===== Eliminated in primary =====
- Spencer Dagner
- Patrick Vincenti, president of the Harford County Council (2018–present) from district E (2014–present)

==== Endorsements ====
Bob Cassilly

State legislators

- Lauren Arikan, state delegate from district 7B (2019–present)
- Ryan Nawrocki, state delegate from district 7A (2023–present)
- Kathy Szeliga, state delegate from district 7A (2011–present)

Organizations

- Maryland Right to Life
Patrick Vincenti

County officials

- Jeff Gahler, Harford County sheriff (2014–present)
- Alison Healey, Harford County state's attorney (2023–present)

Labor unions

- American Federation of State, County and Municipal Employees Council 3
- Harford County Fraternal Order of Police
- Maryland State Education Association

==== Fundraising ====
Campaign finance reports as of June 7, 2026
Candidate	Raised	Spent	Cash on hand
Bob Cassilly (R)	$972,709	$938,824	$91,381
Patrick Vincenti (R)	$607,319	$605,260	$233,036
Source: Maryland State Board of Elections

==== Results ====
Results by precinct Cassilly: 40–50%; 50–60%; 60–70%; 70–80%; Vincenti: 40–50%; 50–60%; Tie

Republican primary results
Party	Candidate	Votes	%
Republican	Bob Cassilly (incumbent)	15,521	59.56%
Republican	Patrick Vincenti	9,189	35.26%
Republican	Spencer D. Dagner	1,348	5.17%
Total votes		26,058	100.00%

=== Democratic primary ===
==== Candidates ====
===== Nominee =====
- Barbara Osborn Kreamer, former state delegate from the 34th district (1983–1991)

===== Eliminated in primary =====
- Matthew Brown, substitute teacher

==== Endorsements ====
Barbara Osborn Kreamer

Organizations

- Maryland National Organization for Women

==== Fundraising ====
Campaign finance reports as of June 7, 2026
Candidate	Raised	Spent	Cash on hand
Barbara Osborn Kreamer (D)	$446	$351	$185
Source: Maryland State Board of Elections

==== Results ====
Results by precinct Osborn Kreamer: 50–60%; 60–70%; Brown: 50–60%; 60–70%

Democratic primary results
Party	Candidate	Votes	%
Democratic	Barbara Osborn Kreamer	7,606	50.57%
Democratic	Matthew Brown	7,436	49.43%
Total votes		15,042	100.00%

=== General election ===
==== Fundraising ====
Campaign finance reports as of November 10, 2026
Candidate	Raised	Spent	Cash on hand
Bob Cassilly (R)	$1,130,774	$1,149,726	$38,545
Barbara Osborn Kreamer (D)	$1,187	$389	$889
Source: Maryland State Board of Elections

==== Results ====
2026 Harford County executive election
Party	Candidate	Votes	%	±%
Republican	Bob Cassilly (incumbent)	60,314	54.79%	−9.31%
Democratic	Barbara Osborn Kreamer	49,373	44.85%	+9.21%
Write-in		405	0.37%	+0.11%
Total votes		110,092	100.00%	

== Howard County ==
2026 Howard County executive election

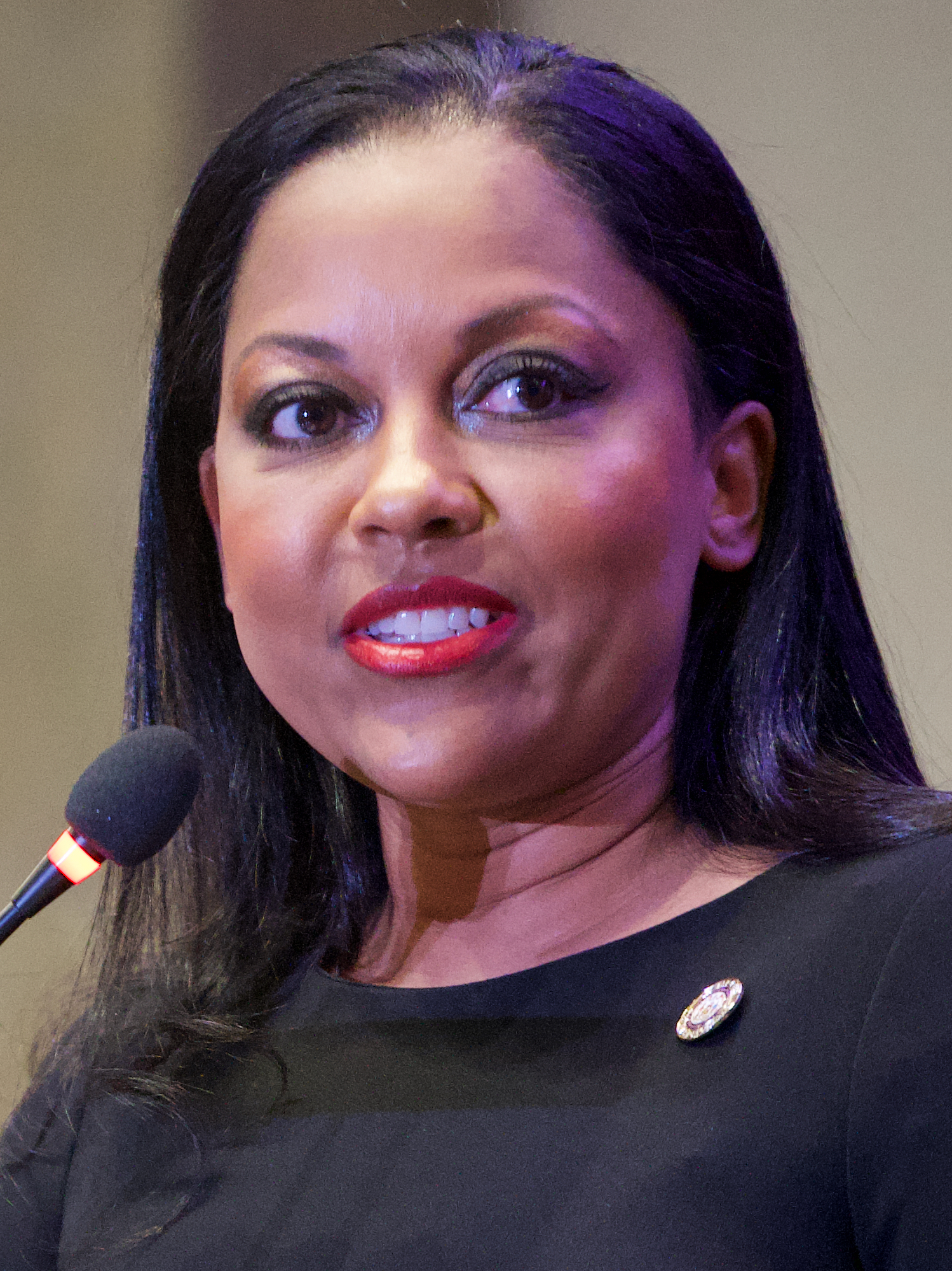

Nominee	Vanessa Atterbeary	Nater Kane
Party	Democratic	Green
Popular vote	102,532	20,875
Percentage	81.5%	16.6%
- Atterbeary: 50–60% 60–70% 70–80% 80–90% >90%
County Executive before election
Calvin Ball III
Democratic
Elected County Executive
Vanessa Atterbeary
Democratic

The incumbent county executive is Democrat Calvin Ball III, who was re-elected in 2022 with 59.1 percent of the vote. He is ineligible to run for a third term due to term limits.

Former state delegate Vanessa Atterbeary won the Democratic primary on June 23, 2026, and faces Green Party nominee Nater Kane in the general election. Atterbeary defeated Kane in the general election on November 3, 2026, becoming the first Black woman to serve as Howard County executive as well as the county's first woman county executive since Elizabeth Bobo, who served from 1986 to 1990.

=== Democratic primary ===
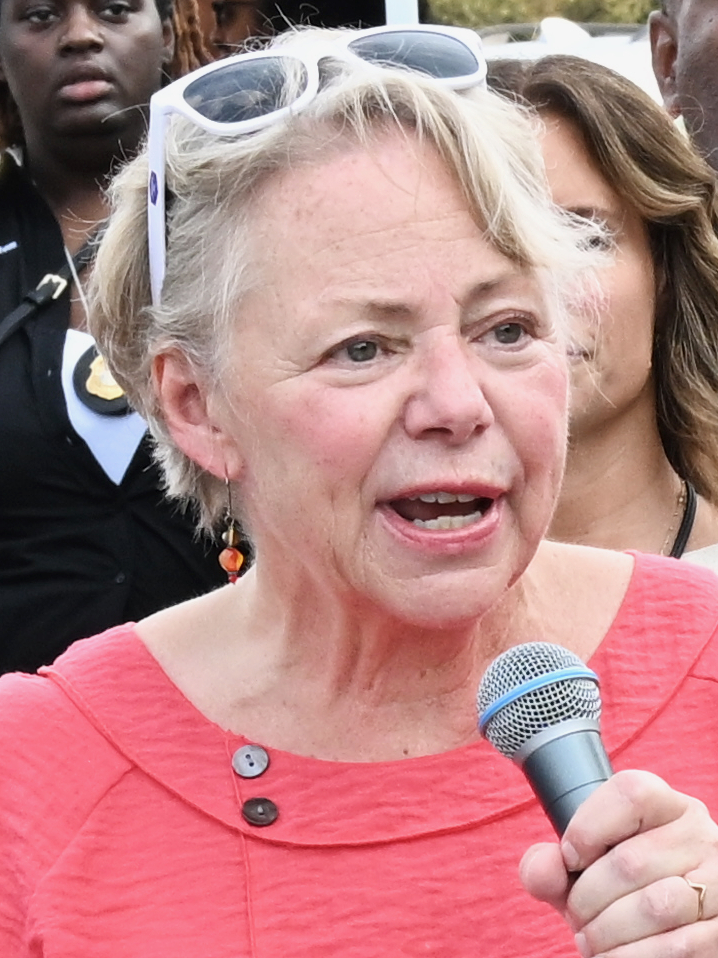
Deb Jung

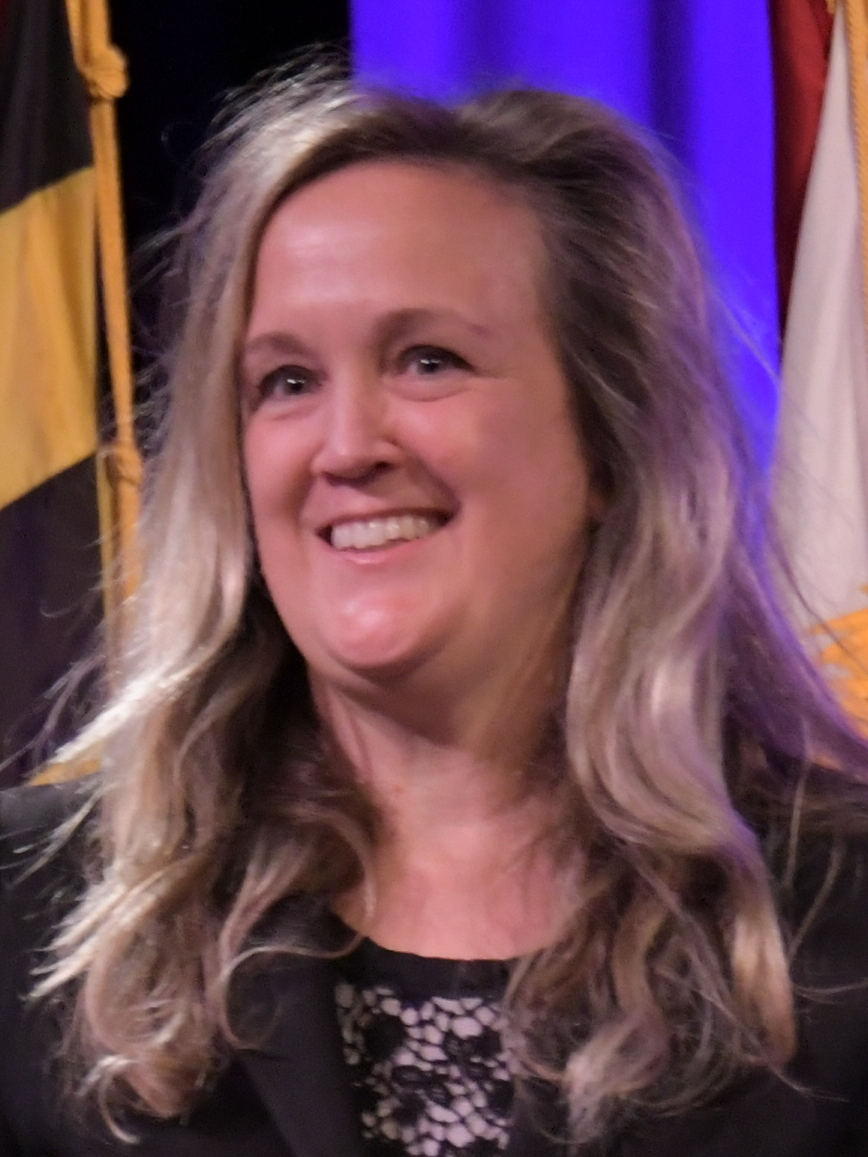
Liz Walsh

==== Candidates ====
===== Nominee =====
- Vanessa Atterbeary, former state delegate from the 13th district (2015–2026)

===== Eliminated in primary =====
- Bob Cockey, restaurateur and Republican nominee for SD-12 in 2022
- Deb Jung, county councilmember from the 4th district (2018–present)
- Liz Walsh, county councilmember from the 1st district (2018–present)

===== Withdrew =====
- Jessica Feldmark, state delegate from district 12A (2019–present) (ran for re-election, endorsed Atterbeary)

===== Declined =====
- Katie Fry Hester, state senator from the 9th district (2019–present) (ran for re-election)
- Opel Jones, county councilmember from the 2nd district (2018–present) (endorsed Atterbeary)
- Clarence Lam, state senator from the 12th district (2019–present) (ran for re-election)
- Christiana Rigby, county councilmember from the 3rd district (2018–present) (ran for re-election, endorsed Atterbeary)
- Courtney Watson, state delegate from district 9B (2019–present) and nominee for county executive in 2014 (ran for re-election)

==== Endorsements ====
Vanessa Atterbeary

U.S. senators

- Angela Alsobrooks, Maryland (2025–present)

U.S. representatives

- Sarah Elfreth, MD-03 (2025–present)

Statewide officials

- Dereck E. Davis, Maryland State Treasurer (2021–present)
- Wes Moore, Maryland governor (2023–present)

State legislators

- Jessica Feldmark, state delegate from district 12A (2019–present)
- Chao Wu, state delegate from district 9A (2023–present)

County officials

- Calvin Ball III, Howard County executive (2018–present)
- Rich Gibson, Howard County state's attorney (2019–present)
- C. Vernon Gray, former county councilmember from the 2nd district (1983–2002)
- Opel Jones, county councilmember from the 2nd district (2018–present)
- Christiana Rigby, county councilmember from the 3rd district (2018–present)
- Ken Ulman, former Howard County executive (2006–2014) and chair of the Maryland Democratic Party (2023–2025)

Labor unions

- American Federation of State, County and Municipal Employees Council 3
- Fraternal Order of Police Lodges 21 and 143
- International Union of Painters and Allied Trades Council 51
- Laborers' International Union of North America Philadelphia/Baltimore/Washington Laborers' District Council
- Maryland State Education Association

Organizations

- Moms Demand Action (co-endorsed with Jung and Walsh)

Newspapers

- Baltimore Afro-American
Deb Jung

State legislators

- Elizabeth Bobo, former state delegate from district 12B (1995–2015) and former Howard County executive (1986–1990)

Labor unions

- Howard County Association of Realtors
- International Association of Fire Fighters Local 2000

Organizations

- Moms Demand Action (co-endorsed with Atterbeary and Walsh)
Liz Walsh

Organizations

- 314 Action
- Council on American–Islamic Relations Action
- CASA in Action
- Moms Demand Action (co-endorsed with Atterbeary and Jung)
Jessica Feldmark (withdrew)

State legislators

- Guy Guzzone, state senator from the 13th district (2015–present)
- Pam Guzzone, state delegate from the 13th district (2023–present)
- Shane Pendergrass, former state delegate from the 13th district (1995–2023)

County officials

- Byron Macfarlane, Howard County register of wills (2010–present)
- ~~Ken Ulman, former Howard County executive (2006–2014) and chair of the Maryland Democratic Party (2023–2025)~~ (switched endorsement to Atterbeary after Feldmark withdrew)

==== Debates and forums ====
2026 Howard County executive Democratic primary debates
No.	Date	Host	Participants			
P Participant A Absent N Non-invitee I Invitee W Withdrawn						
P Participant A Absent N Non-invitee I Invitee W Withdrawn			Atterbeary	Cockey	Jung	Walsh
1	Jan 10, 2026	Illuminate Maryland	P	P	P	P
2	Mar 8, 2026	PATH Maryland	P	P	P	P
3	Mar 14, 2026	PTA Council of Howard County	P	P	P	P
4	Apr 21, 2026	League of Women Voters of Howard County	P	P	P	P

==== Fundraising ====
Cockey, Jung, and Walsh are all utilizing public financing through the Citizens' Election Fund, while Atterbeary opted against using public financing for her campaign.

Campaign finance reports as of June 7, 2026
Candidate	Raised	Spent	Cash on hand
Vanessa Atterbeary (D)	$1,235,282	$897,636	$335,656
Bob Cockey (D)	$7,849	$8,423	$801
Deb Jung (D)	$487,214	$402,024	$97,190
Liz Walsh (D)	$278,260	$213,646	$64,134
Source: Maryland State Board of Elections

==== Polling ====
Poll source	Date(s) administered	Sample size	Margin of error	Vanessa Atterbeary	Deb Jung	Liz Walsh	Undecided
Hart Research (D) (Note: Poll sponsored by Walsh's campaign)	April 6–9, 2026	401 (LV)	± 5.0%	17%	12%	13%	58%

==== Results ====
Results by precinct Atterbeary: 30–40%; 40–50%; 50–60%; 60–70%; 70–80%; Jung: 40–50%; 50–60%; Walsh: 30–40%; 40–50%; 50–60%; Tie 40–50%

Democratic primary results
Party	Candidate	Votes	%
Democratic	Vanessa Atterbeary	22,545	54.91%
Democratic	Deb Jung	9,031	22.00%
Democratic	Liz Walsh	8,749	21.31%
Democratic	Bob Cockey	732	1.78%
Total votes		41,057	100.00%

=== Third-party and independent candidates ===
==== Declared ====
- Nater Kane (Green), software engineer

==== Declined ====
- Allan Kittleman, former county executive (2014–2018) and Republican nominee for county executive in 2022

=== General election ===
==== Fundraising ====
Campaign finance reports as of November 10, 2026
Candidate	Raised	Spent	Cash on hand
Vanessa Atterbeary (D)	$1,552,849	$1,468,493	$80,386
Source: Maryland State Board of Elections

==== Results ====
2026 Howard County executive election
Party	Candidate	Votes	%	±%
Democratic	Vanessa Atterbeary	102,532	81.52%	+22.45%
Green	Nater Kane	20,875	16.60%	N/A
Write-in		2,372	1.89%	+1.77%
Total votes		125,779	100.00%	

== Montgomery County ==
2026 Montgomery County executive election

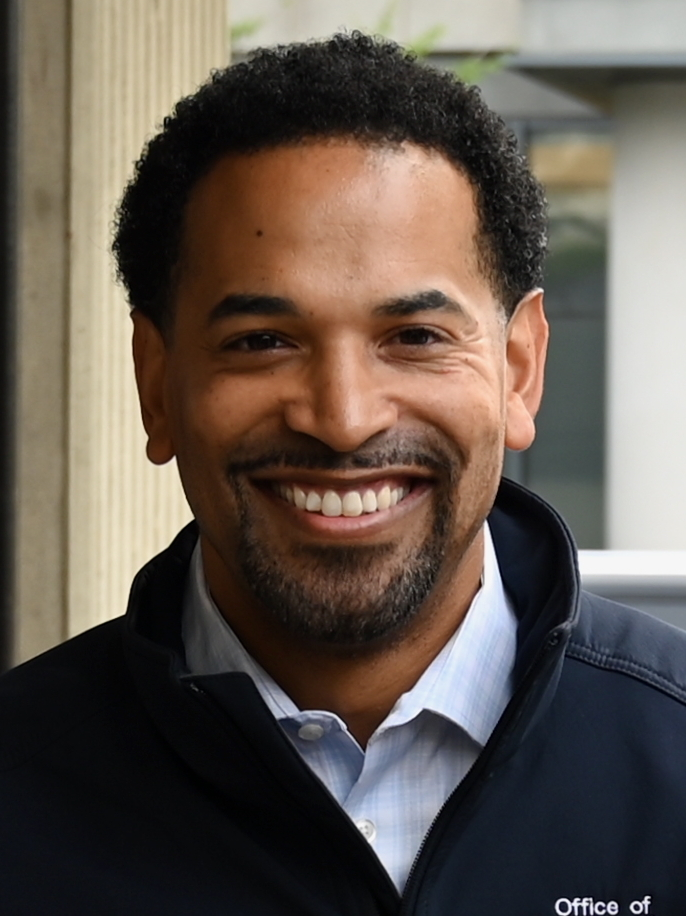

Nominee	Will Jawando	Esther Wells
Party	Democratic	Republican
Popular vote	298,329	78,238
Percentage	78.9%	20.7%
- Jawando: 50–60% 60–70% 70–80% 80–90% >90% Wells: 50–60%
County Executive before election
Marc Elrich
Democratic
Elected County Executive
Will Jawando
Democratic

The incumbent county executive is Democrat Marc Elrich, who was re-elected in 2022 with 75.1 percent of the vote. He initially said that he would run for a third term; however, Montgomery County voters approved a referendum during the 2024 elections limiting county executives to two consecutive terms, barring Elrich from running for a third term.

Primary elections were held on June 23, 2026. At-large Montgomery County councilmember Will Jawando won the Democratic primary, while accountant Esther Wells won the Republican primary. Jawando defeated Wells in the general election on November 3, 2026.

=== Democratic primary ===
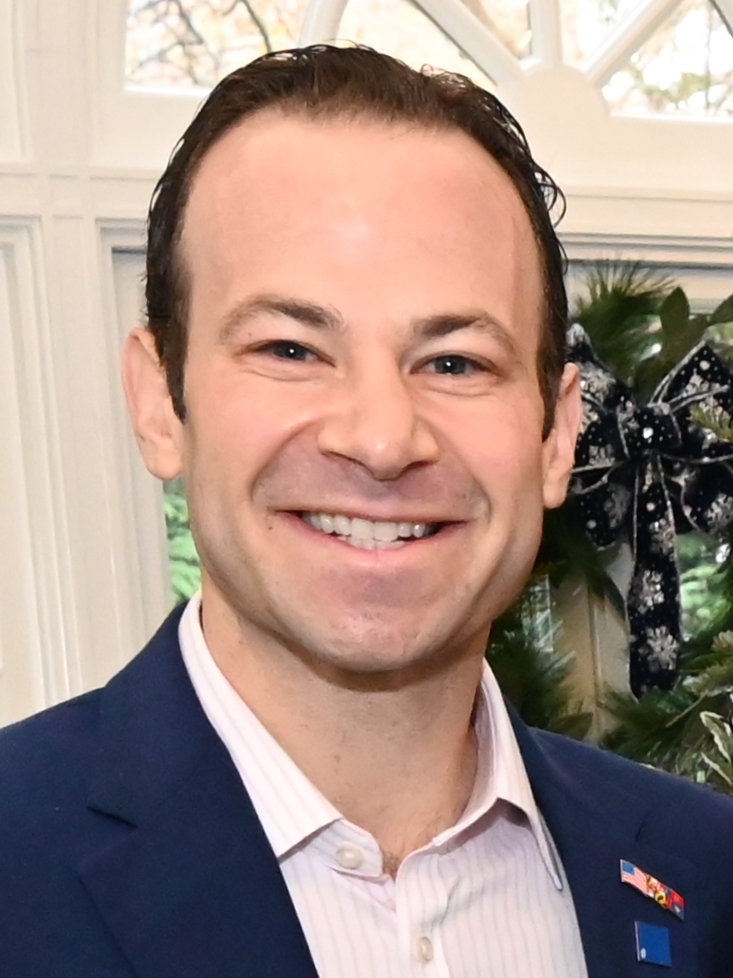
Andrew Friedson

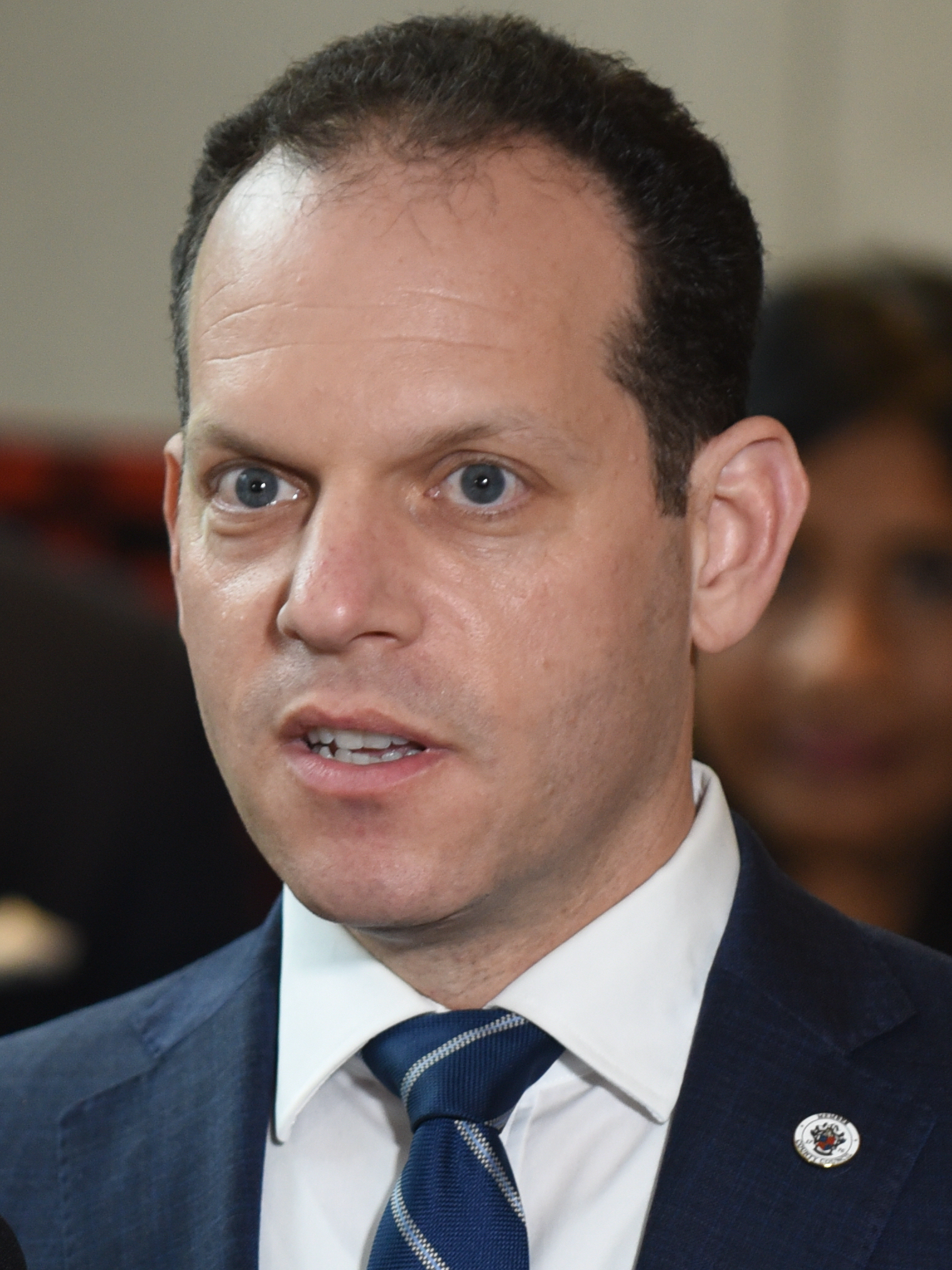
Evan Glass

==== Candidates ====
===== Nominee =====
- Will Jawando, at-large county councilmember (2018–present), candidate for Maryland's 20th house district in 2014, candidate for Maryland's 8th congressional district in 2016, and candidate for U.S. Senate in 2024

===== Eliminated in primary =====
- Mithun Banerjee, real estate investor
- Andrew Friedson, county councilmember from the 1st district (2018–present)
- Evan Glass, at-large county councilmember (2018–present)
- Peter James, tech executive and candidate for county executive in 2022

===== Withdrew =====
- Celeste Iroha, medical assistant and gun safety activist

===== Declined =====
- David Blair, businessman and candidate for county executive in 2018 and 2022 (endorsed Friedson)
- Benjamin F. Kramer, state senator from the 19th district (2019–present) and son of former county executive Sidney Kramer (ran for re-election)
- Kate Stewart, county councilmember from the 4th district (2022–present) (ran for re-election)

==== Endorsements ====
Endorsements in bold were made after the primary elections.

Mithun Banerjee

Organizations

- 314 Action
Andrew Friedson

U.S. representatives

- Michael D. Barnes, MD-08 (1979–1987)
- Sarah Elfreth, MD-03 (2025–present)

Statewide officials

- Peter Franchot, former Maryland Comptroller (2007–2023)
- Doug Gansler, former Maryland Attorney General (2007–2015)
- Nancy Kopp, former Maryland State Treasurer (2002–2021)

State legislators

- Brian Feldman, state senator from the 15th district (2013–present)
- Linda Foley, state delegate from the 15th district (2021–present)
- Katie Fry Hester, state senator from the 9th district (2019–present)
- Cheryl Kagan, state senator from the 17th district (2015–present)
- Nancy King, majority leader of the Maryland Senate (2020–present) from the 39th district (2007–present)
- Marc Korman, state delegate from the 16th district (2015–present)
- Sara Love, state senator from the 16th district (2024–present)
- Lily Qi, state delegate from the 15th district (2019–present)
- Jared Solomon, state delegate from the 18th district (2019–present)
- Sarah Wolek, state delegate from the 16th district (2023–present)
- Teresa Saavedra Woorman, state delegate from the 16th district (2024–present)
- Craig Zucker, state senator from the 14th district (2016–present)

County officials

- Marilyn Balcombe, county councilmember from the 2nd district (2022–present)
- Doug Duncan, former Montgomery County executive (1994–2006)
- Dawn Luedtke, county councilmember from the 7th district (2022–present)
- John McCarthy, Montgomery County state's attorney (2007–present)
- Hans Riemer, former at-large county councilmember (2010–2022) and candidate for county executive in 2022

Individuals

- David Blair, businessman and candidate for county executive in 2018 and 2022

Party officials

- Susan Turnbull, former chair of the Maryland Democratic Party (2009–2011)

Labor unions

- Fraternal Order of Police Lodge 35
- International Association of Fire Fighters Local 1664

Organizations

- Greater Greater Washington
- Moms Demand Action (co-endorsed with Glass and Jawando)
- Greater Capital Area Association of Realtors

Newspapers

- Washington Jewish Week
Evan Glass

Executive branch officials

- Tom Perez, former chair of the Democratic National Committee (2017–2021), U.S. secretary of labor (2013–2017), and Maryland Secretary of Labor (2007–2009)

U.S. representatives

- Suhas Subramanyam, VA-10 (2025–present)
- David Trone, MD-06 (2019–2025)

State legislators

- Bonnie Cullison, state delegate from the 19th district (2011–present)
- Ana Sol Gutierrez, former state delegate from the 18th district (2003–2019) (previously endorsed Jawando)
- Lesley Lopez, state delegate from the 39th district (2019–present)
- Julie Palakovich Carr, state delegate from the 17th district (2019–present)
- Kirill Reznik, former state delegate from the 39th district (2007–2023)
- William C. Smith Jr., state senator from the 20th district (2016–present)
- Joe Vogel, state delegate from the 17th district (2023–present)

County officials

- Natali Fani-González, president of the Montgomery County Council (2025–present) from the 6th district (2022–present)
- Laura Stewart, member of the Montgomery County Board of Education from the 4th district

Organizations

- LGBTQ+ Victory Fund
- Maryland Sierra Club
- Moms Demand Action (co-endorsed with Friedson and Jawando)
Will Jawando

U.S. senators

- Angela Alsobrooks, U.S. senator from Maryland (2025–present)

U.S. representatives

- Kweisi Mfume, MD-07 (1987–1996, 2020–present)

Statewide officials

- Dereck E. Davis, Maryland State Treasurer (2021–present)
- **Brooke Lierman**, Maryland Comptroller (2023–present)
- Wes Moore, Maryland governor (2023–present)

State legislators

- Gabriel Acevero, state delegate from the 39th district (2019–present)
- ~~Ana Sol Gutierrez, former state delegate from the 18th district (2003–2019)~~ (switched endorsement to Glass)
- Pamela E. Queen, state delegate from the 14th district (2016–present)
- Jheanelle Wilkins, state delegate from the 20th district (2017–present)
- **W. Gregory Wims**, state delegate from the 39th district (2023–present)

County officials

- Aisha Braveboy, Prince George's County executive (2025–present)
- Marc Elrich, Montgomery County executive (2018–present)
- Kristin Mink, county councilmember from the 5th district (2022–present)
- Laurie-Anne Sayles, at-large county councilmember (2022–present)

Individuals

- Candiace Dillard Bassett, television personality, singer, and actress

Labor unions

- Amalgamated Transit Union Local 689
- American Federation of State, County and Municipal Employees Council 3
- Laborers' International Union of North America Philadelphia/Baltimore/Washington Laborers' District Council
- Maryland State Education Association
- Metropolitan Washington Council AFL-CIO
- Service Employees International Union Locals 32BJ, 500 and 1199

Organizations

- CASA in Action
- Collective PAC
- Jews United For Justice Campaign Fund
- Moms Demand Action (co-endorsed with Friedson and Glass)
- Our Revolution
- Working Families Party
Declined to endorse

U.S. senators

- Chris Van Hollen, U.S. senator from Maryland (2017–present)

U.S. representatives

- Jamie Raskin, MD-08 (2017–present)

Statewide officials

- ~~Wes Moore, Maryland governor (2023–present)~~ (endorsed Jawando)

County officials

- ~~Natali Fani-González, president of the Montgomery County Council (2025–present) from the 6th district (2022–present)~~ (endorsed Glass)
- Ike Leggett, former Montgomery County executive (2006–2018)

Labor unions

- United Food and Commercial Workers Local 1994 MCGEO

==== Debates and forums ====
2026 Montgomery County executive Democratic primary debates
No.	Date	Host	Participants				
P Participant A Absent N Non-invitee I Invitee W Withdrawn							
P Participant A Absent N Non-invitee I Invitee W Withdrawn			Banerjee	Friedson	Glass	James	Jawando
1	Oct 8, 2026	Montgomery County Renters Alliance; Montgomery County Media	N	P	A	N	P
2	Nov 15, 2026	Montgomery County Civic Federation	P	P	P	N	P
3	Mar 19, 2026	Leisure World Democratic Club	N	P	P	N	P
4	Mar 23, 2026	Fair Access Committee; Poolesville Chamber of Commerce	P	P	P	P	P
5	Apr 15, 2026	Riderwood Democratic Club	P	P	P	P	P
6	Apr 19, 2026	National Pan-Hellenic Council of Montgomery County	P	P	P	P	P
7	Apr 20, 2026	Friends of White Oak; Greater Silver Spring Chamber of Commerce; The Baltimore Banner	P	P	P	P	P
8	Apr 29, 2026	Montgomery County Chamber of Commerce	P	P	P	P	P
9	May 18, 2026	Jewish Community Relations Council of Greater Washington	A	P	P	A	P

==== Fundraising ====
Glass and Jawando are both utilizing public financing through the Public Election Fund, while Friedson opted against using public financing for his campaign. As a result, Friedson raised almost $2.4 million during the Democratic primary, the third most among all state office candidates, behind only Governor Wes Moore and Comptroller Brooke Lierman.

Campaign finance reports as of June 7, 2026
Candidate	Raised	Spent	Cash on hand
Mithun Banerjee (D)	$0	$25	$(25)
Andrew Friedson (D)	$2,383,972	$2,654,483	$232,814
Evan Glass (D)	$990,945	$688,989	$56,383
Will Jawando (D)	$1,222,353	$453,142	$769,211
Source: Maryland State Board of Elections

==== Polling ====
Poll source	Date(s) administered	Sample size	Margin of error	Andrew Friedson	Evan Glass	Will Jawando	Others	Undecided
Tavern Research (Note: Poll conducted by Affordable Maryland PAC, which opposes Jawando)	May 29 – June 1, 2026	1,042 (LV)	± 4.0%	**24%**	17%	20%	–	**36%**
Hart Research (Note: Poll sponsored by Jawando's campaign)	May 28–31, 2026	400 (LV)	± 5.0%	**26%**	25%	**26%**	–	21%
Global Strategy Group (Note: Poll sponsored by Friedson's campaign)	May 26–28, 2026	400 (LV)	± 4.9%	**25%**	18%	19%	–	**38%**
Tavern Research	April 2026	1,126 (LV)	–	8%	**15%**	12%	–	**61%**
Impact Research (Note: Poll sponsored by Glass's campaign)	February 9–12, 2026	400 (LV)	± 4.9%	16%	**21%**	20%	1% (Note: Mithun Banerjee with 1%)	**43%**
Tavern Research	January 2026	1,126 (LV)	–	9%	13%	**14%**	–	**60%**

==== Results ====
Results by precinct Jawando: 30–40%; 40–50%; 50–60%; 60–70%; 70–80%; 80–90%; Friedson: 30–40%; 40–50%; 50–60%; 60–70%; 70–80%; Glass: 30–40%; 40–50%; 50–60%

Democratic primary results
Party	Candidate	Votes	%
**Democratic**	**Will Jawando**	**52,744**	**40.15%**
Democratic	Andrew Friedson	44,520	33.89%
Democratic	Evan Glass	29,006	22.08%
Democratic	Mithun Banerjee	2,996	2.28%
Democratic	Peter James	2,106	1.60%
Total votes		**131,372**	**100.00%**

=== Republican primary ===
==== Candidates ====
===== Nominee =====
- Esther Wells, accountant and president of the Montgomery County Taxpayers League

===== Eliminated in primary =====
- Shelly Skolnick, attorney and perennial candidate

===== Declined =====
- Reardon Sullivan, former chair of the Montgomery County Republican Party (2025–2026) and nominee for county executive in 2022 (ran for county council)

==== Endorsements ====
Endorsements in bold were made after the primary elections.

Esther Wells

County officials

- **Neil Parrott**, member of the Washington County Board of Commissioners (2026–present)

==== Fundraising ====
Campaign finance reports as of June 7, 2026
Candidate	Raised	Spent	Cash on hand
Shelly Skolnick (R)	$1,000	$0	$1,000
Esther Wells (R)	$7,472 (Note: $1,000 of this total was self-funded by Wells)	$5,481	$3,202
Source: Maryland State Board of Elections

==== Results ====
Results by precinct Wells: 50–60%; 60–70%; 70–80%; 80–90%; >90%; Skolnick: 50–60%; 60–70%; 70–80%; >90%; Tie

Republican primary results
Party	Candidate	Votes	%
**Republican**	**Esther Wells**	**6,850**	**60.76%**
Republican	Shelly Skolnick	4,423	39.24%
Total votes		**11,271**	**100.00%**

=== General election ===
==== Fundraising ====
Campaign finance reports as of November 10, 2026
Candidate	Raised	Spent	Cash on hand
Will Jawando (D)	$1,442,722	$1,432,028	$62,039
Esther Wells (R)	$56,694 (Note: $1,500 of this total was self-funded by Wells)	$50,395	$7,842
Source: Maryland State Board of Elections

==== Results ====
2026 Montgomery County executive election
Party	Candidate	Votes	%	±%
**Democratic**	**Will Jawando**	**298,329**	**78.91%**	**+3.80%**
Republican	Esther Wells	78,238	20.69%	−3.58%
Write-in		1,507	0.40%	-0.22%
Total votes		**378,074**	**100.00%**	

== Prince George's County ==
2026 Prince George's County executive election

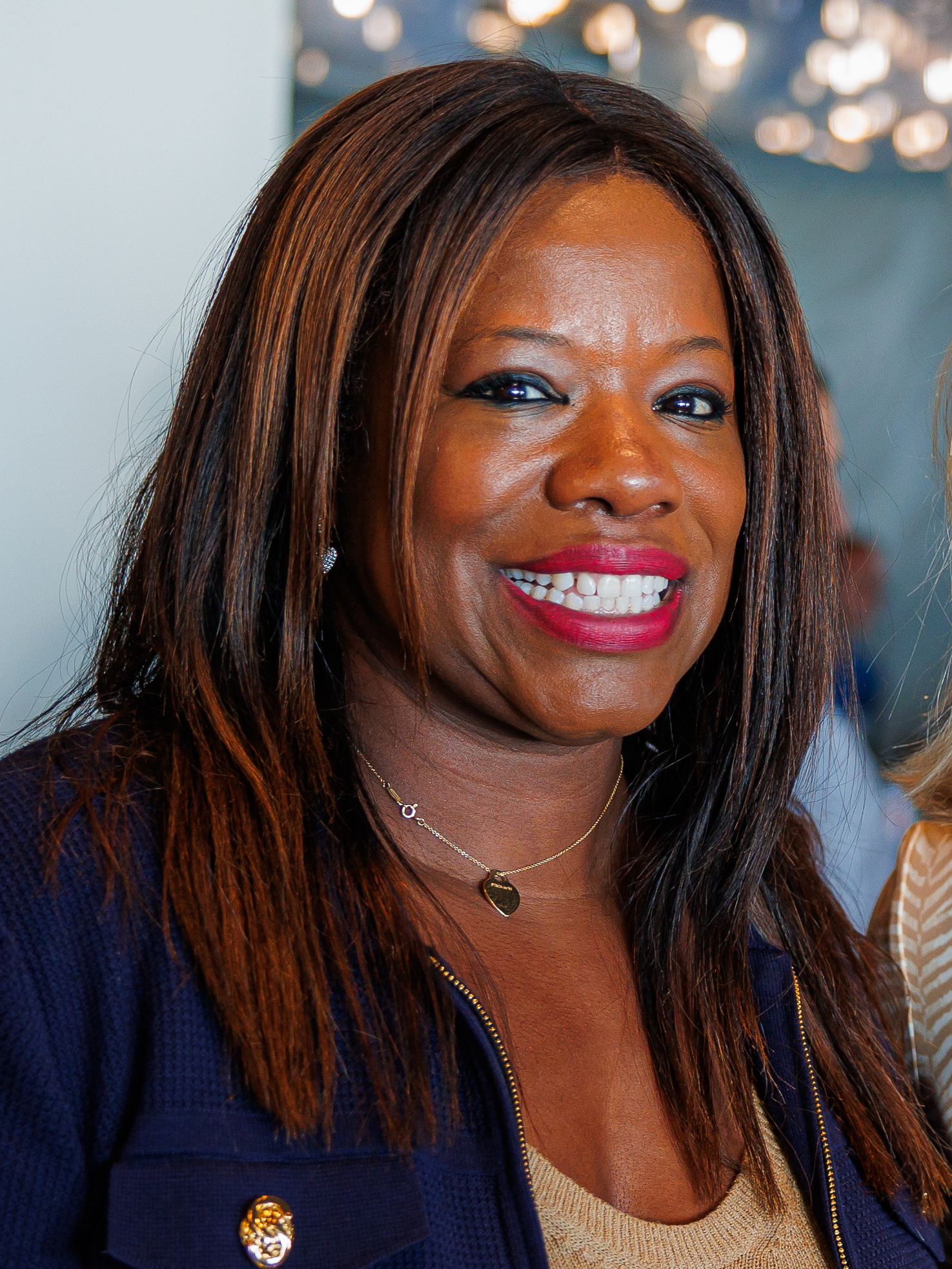

Nominee	Aisha Braveboy	Other Write-ins
Party	Democratic	Write-In
County Executive before election
Aisha Braveboy
Democratic
Elected County Executive
Aisha Braveboy
Democratic

The incumbent county executive is Aisha Braveboy, who was elected in 2025 with 91.2 percent of the vote. She won re-election to a full four-year term unopposed.

Braveboy easily won the Democratic primary election on June 23, 2026.

=== Democratic primary ===
==== Candidates ====
===== Nominee =====
- Aisha Braveboy, incumbent county executive (2025–present)

===== Eliminated in primary =====
- Billy Bridges, U.S. Air Force veteran, IT specialist, and candidate for county executive in 2018 and 2022
- Marcellus Crews, tech executive, candidate for U.S. Senate in 2024, and candidate for county executive in 2025
- Charnell Ferguson, nonprofit executive
- Greg Holmes, perennial candidate

===== Declined =====
- Jolene Ivey, at-large county councilmember (2024–present) and candidate for county executive in 2025 (ran for re-election)

==== Endorsements ====
Aisha Braveboy

Statewide officials

- Wes Moore, Maryland governor (2023–present)

Labor unions

- Amalgamated Transit Union Local 689
- American Federation of State, County and Municipal Employees Council 3
- Laborers' International Union of North America Philadelphia/Baltimore/Washington Laborers' District Council
- Maryland State Education Association
- Metropolitan Washington Council AFL-CIO
- United Food and Commercial Workers Local 1994 MCGEO

Organizations

- Moms Demand Action

Newspapers

- Baltimore Afro-American

==== Fundraising ====
Campaign finance reports as of June 7, 2026
Candidate	Raised	Spent	Cash on hand
Aisha Braveboy (D)	$2,064,749	$1,409,038	$819,501
Charnell Ferguson (D)	$11,289	$5,946	$5,343
Greg Holmes (D)	$13,893	$10,078	$3,814
Source: Maryland State Board of Elections

==== Results ====
Democratic primary results
Party	Candidate	Votes	%
Democratic	Aisha Braveboy (incumbent)	87,944	73.31%
Democratic	Gregory Holmes	13,979	11.65%
Democratic	Charnell D. Ferguson	9,328	7.78%
Democratic	Billy W. Bridges	5,027	4.19%
Democratic	Marcellus Crews	3,686	3.07%
Total votes		119,964	100.00%

=== Third-party and independent candidates ===
==== Candidates ====
===== Disqualified =====
- Moisette Tonya Sweat (Independent), attorney and Democratic candidate for county executive in 2022 and 2025 (ran as a write-in candidate)

==== Endorsements ====
Moisette Tonya Sweat

Organizations

- Maryland Forward Party

==== Fundraising ====
Campaign finance reports as of June 7, 2026
Candidate	Raised	Spent	Cash on hand
Moisette Tonya Sweat (I)	$30,222	$27,962	$1,988
Source: Maryland State Board of Elections

=== General election ===
==== Fundraising ====
Campaign finance reports as of November 10, 2026
Candidate	Raised	Spent	Cash on hand
Aisha Braveboy (D)	$2,287,714	$1,715,321	$736,182
Source: Maryland State Board of Elections

==== Results ====
2026 Prince George's County executive election
Party	Candidate	Votes	%	±%
Democratic	Aisha Braveboy (incumbent)			
Write-in				
Total votes				N/A

== Wicomico County ==
2026 Wicomico County executive election
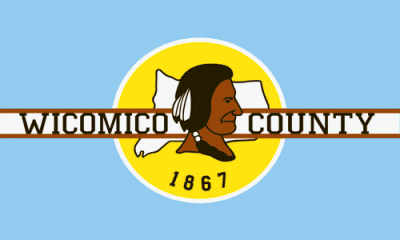

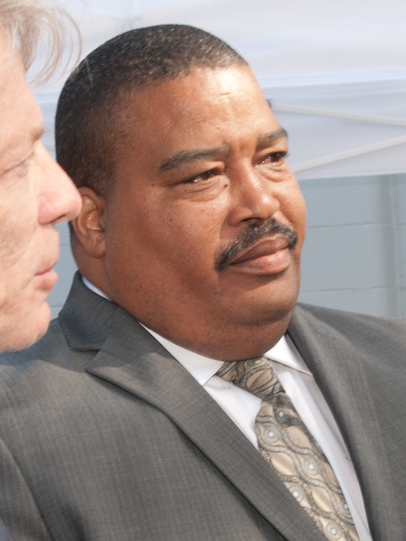

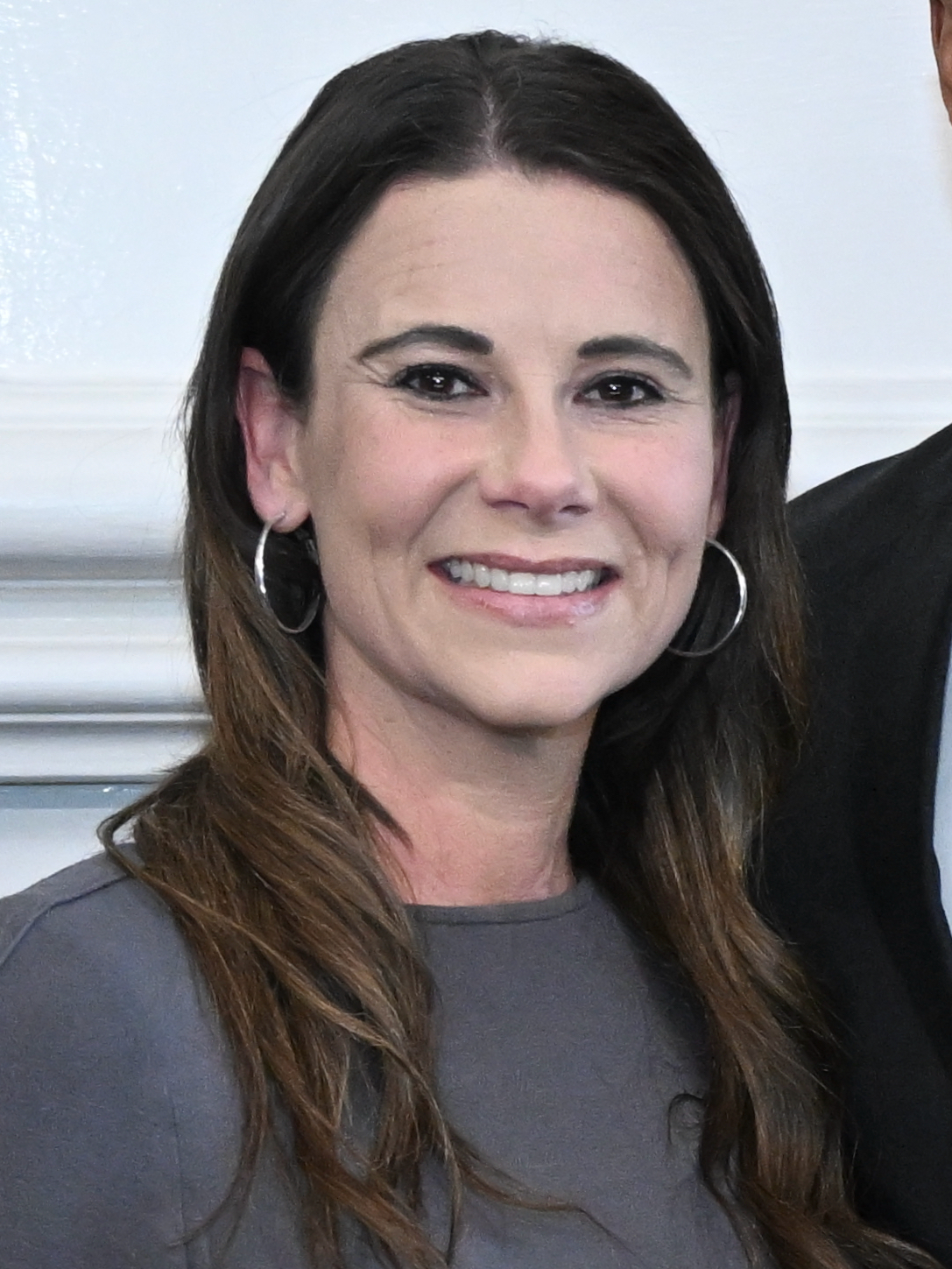
Nominee	Ernest Davis	Julie Giordano
Party	Democratic	Republican
Popular vote	18,251	15,485
Percentage	54.0%	45.8%
- Davis: 50–60% 60–70% 70–80% 80–90% >90% Giordano: 50–60% 60–70% 70–80% 80–90% Tie: 50%
County Executive before election
Julie Giordano
Republican
Elected County Executive
Ernest Davis
Democratic

The incumbent county executive is Republican Julie Giordano, who was elected in 2022 with 51.2 percent of the vote. She ran for a second term in office, but was defeated by former county councilmember Ernest Davis in the general election.

Giordano and former Wicomico County councilmember Ernest Davis ran unopponsed in the Republican and Democratic primaries respectively. Davis defeated Giordano in the general election on November 3, 2026, becoming the first African-American county executive of Wicomico County as well as Wicomico County's first Democratic county executive since 2010.

=== Republican primary ===
==== Candidates ====
===== Nominee =====
- Julie Giordano, incumbent county executive

==== Fundraising ====
Campaign finance reports as of June 7, 2026
Candidate	Raised	Spent	Cash on hand
Julie Giordano (R)	$65,037	$46,727	$19,437
Source: Maryland State Board of Elections

==== Results ====
Republican primary results
Party	Candidate	Votes	%
**Republican**	**Julie Giordano (incumbent)**	**5,097**	**100.00%**
Total votes		**5,097**	**100.00%**

=== Democratic primary ===
==== Candidates ====
===== Nominee =====
- Ernest Davis, former county councilmember from the 1st district (2014–2022) and nominee for county executive in 2022

===== Withdrew =====
- Michele Gregory, Salisbury city councilor (2019–present) and nominee for SD-38 in 2022

==== Endorsements ====
Endorsements in bold were made after the primary elections.

Ernest Davis

County officials

- **Joseph Holloway**, county councilmember from the 5th district (2006–present) (Republican)

==== Fundraising ====
Campaign finance reports as of June 7, 2026
Candidate	Raised	Spent	Cash on hand
Ernest Davis (D)	$7,674	$6,604	$5,289
Source: Maryland State Board of Elections

==== Results ====
Democratic primary results
Party	Candidate	Votes	%
**Democratic**	**Ernest Davis**	**5,058**	**100.00%**
Total votes		**5,058**	**100.00%**

=== General election ===
==== Fundraising ====
Campaign finance reports as of November 10, 2026
Candidate	Raised	Spent	Cash on hand
Julie Giordano (R)	$78,853	$76,684	$3,296
Ernest Davis (D)	$21,019	$20,245	$4,992
Source: Maryland State Board of Elections

==== Results ====
2026 Wicomico County executive election
Party	Candidate	Votes	%	±%
**Democratic**	**Ernest Davis**	**18,251**	**54.02%**	**+10.95%**
Republican	Julie Giordano (incumbent)	15,485	45.83%	−5.32%
Write-in		51	0.15%	-0.02%
Total votes		**33,787**	**100.00%**	

== Notes ==
Partisan clients
